= Associated Daughters of Early American Witches =

Nonprofit lineage society

- Founded: 1985; 41 years ago 1986 (incorporation)
- Type: Non-profit, lineage society
- Purpose: Historic preservation, education, genealogy
- President General: Anne Caussin Henninger
- Website: adeaw.us

The Associated Daughters of Early American Witches is a lineage-based membership organization for women who are directly descended from a person accused of witchcraft in the witch trials of Colonial America.

== Founding ==
The society was established in 1985 in Washington, D.C. and formally incorporated in 1986. The first organizational meeting of the society was held in April 1987 at the Mayflower Hotel with 35 charter members. The organization received its 501(c)(3) organization status in 1990. The society is listed in the Hereditary Society Community of the United States of America.

== Structure ==
Membership in the society is by invitation only. To become a member, a woman must be at least sixteen years of age and able to prove lineal bloodline descent from an ancestor who was accused, tried, and/or executed for the practice of witchcraft prior to December 31, 1699, in Colonial America.

The society is led by 8 officers, including a President General, First Vice President General, Second Vice President General, Recording Secretary General, Corresponding Secretary General, Treasurer General, Registrar General, and Historian General.

The society maintains a Roll of Ancestors which currently includes the full names of over 300 ancestors.

== List of qualifying ancestors ==
As of 2012, the below named individuals are listed as qualifying ancestors in the society's Roll of Ancestors. They are listed in the full registry by name, spouses (if applicable), colony, and the year of their first accusation or trial. The full registry also includes partial names and surnames if no first name is available.

Roll of Ancestors
Name	Colony	Year
Arthur Abbott	Massachusetts	1692
Nehemiah Abbott	Massachusetts	1692
Capt. John Alden Jr.	Massachusetts	1692
Daniel Andrews	Massachusetts	1692
Ann Austin	Massachusetts	1656
Elizabeth Ayers	Connecticut	1662
William Ayers	Connecticut	1662
Elizabeth Dearing Bailey	Maine	1660
Mrs. George Barker	Virginia	1641
Abigail Barker	Massachusetts	1692
Mary Barker	Massachusetts	1692
William Barker Sr.	Massachusetts	1692
William Barker Jr.	Massachusetts	1692
Mary Barnes	Connecticut	1662
Margery Bassett	Connecticut	1651
Sarah Hood Bassett	Massachusetts	1692
Nicholas Bayley (and wife)	Connecticut	1655
Alice Beamon	Massachusetts	1677
Winifred King Benham	Connecticut	1697
Elizabeth Bennett	Maryland	1665
Sarah Bibber	Massachusetts	1692
Bridget Bishop	Massachusetts	1692
Edward Bishop Jr.	Massachusetts	1692
Sarah Bishop	Massachusetts	1692
Mary Black	Massachusetts	1692
Elizabeth Blackleach	Connecticut	1662
John Blackleach	Connecticut	1662
Grace Swaine Boulter	New Hampshire	1680
Mary Perkins Bradbury	Massachusetts	1692
Dudley Bradstreet	Massachusetts	1692
John Bradstreet	Massachusetts	1692
Mary Bridges	Massachusetts	1692
Sarah Bridges	Massachusetts	1692
William Browne	Massachusetts	1657
Hannah Brumidge	Massachusetts	1692
Sarah Buckley	Massachusetts	1692
Rev. George Burroughs	Massachusetts	1692
Ann Burt	Massachusetts	1669
Rev. John Buss	Massachusetts	1692
John Buxton	Massachusetts	1692
Anne Byrd	Virginia	1698
John Byrd	Virginia	1698
Nell Cane	Virginia	1693
Andrew Carrier	Massachusetts	1692
Martha Allen Carrier	Massachusetts	1692
Richard Carrier	Massachusetts	1692
Sarah Carrier	Massachusetts	1692
Thomas Carrier Jr.	Massachusetts	1692
Joanne Carrington	Connecticut	1651
John Carrington	Connecticut	1651
Hannah Carroll	Massachusetts	1692
Bethiah Carter	Massachusetts	1692
Paul Carter	Virginia	1678
Alice Cartwrite	Virginia	1678
Elizabeth Cary	Massachusetts	1692
Rebecca Chamberlain	Massachusetts	1692
Sarah Churchill	Massachusetts	1692
Mary Clark	Massachusetts	1692
Elizabeth Clawson	Connecticut	1692
Rachel Clinton	Massachusetts	1687
Sarah Cloyce	Massachusetts	1692
Eunice Cole	New Hampshire	1656
Sarah Davis Cole	Massachusetts	1692
Collins surname (male)	Rhode Island	1640
Jane Collins	Massachusetts	1653
Elizabeth Colson	Massachusetts	1692
Mary Colson	Massachusetts	1692
Giles Corey	Massachusetts	1692
Martha Corey	Massachusetts	1692
John Cowman	Maryland	1674
Mary Cox	Massachusetts	1692
Edith Crawford	Massachusetts	1667
Hugh Crosha	Connecticut	1692
Deliverance Dane	Massachusetts	1692
Dane (male slave)	Massachusetts	1692
Phoebe Day	Massachusetts	1692
Mary Derich	Massachusetts	1692
Sarah Dibble	Connecticut	1669
Elizabeth Dicer	Massachusetts	1692
James Dike	Massachusetts	1692
Rebecca Dike	Massachusetts	1692
Nicholas Disbrow	Connecticut	1683
Mercy Disbrow	Connecticut	1692
Ann Dolliver	Massachusetts	1692
Mehitabel Downing	Massachusetts	1692
Joseph Draper	Massachusetts	1692
Elizabeth Dunkin	Virginia	1695
John Dunkin	Virginia	1695
John Durrant	Massachusetts	1692
Lydia Dustin	Massachusetts	1692
Sarah Dustin	Massachusetts	1692
Grace Dutch	Massachusetts	1653
Thomas Dyer	Massachusetts	1692
Daniel Eames	Massachusetts	1692
Rebecca Eames	Massachusetts	1692
Mary Eastey	Massachusetts	1692
Anna Edmunds	Massachusetts	1673
Hannah Edwards	Maryland	1686
Esther Dutch Elwell	Massachusetts	1692
Martha Toothaker Emerson	Massachusetts	1692
Joseph Emons	Massachusetts	1692
Mary Hollingworth English	Massachusetts	1692
Phillip English	Massachusetts	1692
Agnes Evans	Massachusetts	1653
Thomas Farrar	Massachusetts	1692
Edward Farrington	Massachusetts	1692
Abigail Faulkner	Massachusetts	1692
Dorothy Faulkner	Massachusetts	1692
Mary Isher	Massachusetts	1656
John Floyd	Massachusetts	1692
Elizabeth Fosdick	Massachusetts	1692
Ann Foster	Massachusetts	1692
Rebecca Fowler	Maryland	1685
Nicholas Frost	New Hampshire	1692
Eunice Potter Frye	Massachusetts	1692
James Fuller	Massachusetts	1683
Rachel Fuller	New Hampshire	1680
Elizabeth Garlick	New York	1657
Margaret Gifford	Massachusetts	1680
Lydia Gilbert	Connecticut	1654
Gleason surname (female)	Massachusetts	1665
Mary Glover	Massachusetts	1688
John Godfrey	Massachusetts	1658
Elizabeth Godman	Connecticut	1653
Dorcas Good	Massachusetts	1692
Sarah Good	Massachusetts	1692
Katherine Grady	Virginia	1654
Grant surname (female)	Connecticut	1662
William Graves	Connecticut	1666
Mary Green	Massachusetts	1692
Nathaniel Greensmith	Connecticut	1662
Rebecca Greensmith	Connecticut	1662
Anna Griswold	Connecticut	1667
Mary Hale	Massachusetts	1681
Sarah Hale	Massachusetts	1692
Hales surname (male)	Rhode Island	1640
Mary Hall	New York	1665
Ralph Hall	New York	1665
William Ham	New Hampshire	1656
William Harding	Virginia	1656
Thomas Hardy	Massachusetts	1692
Katherine Harrison	Connecticut	1668
Elizabeth Hart	Massachusetts	1692
Hannah Harvey	Connecticut	1692
Mary Harvey	Connecticut	1692
Candy (female slave)	Massachusetts	1692
Margaret Hawkes	Massachusetts	1692
Sarah Hawkes	Massachusetts	1692
Jane Hawkins	Massachusetts	1637
Gertrude Hendrickson	Pennsylvania	1683
Anne Hibbins	Massachusetts	1655
Dorcas Hoar	Massachusetts	1692
Abigail Hobbs	Massachusetts	1692
Deliverance Hobbs	Massachusetts	1692
William Hobbs	Massachusetts	1692
Mary Holman	Massachusetts	1659
Winifred Holman	Massachusetts	1659
Elizabeth Holmes	Massachusetts	1660
John Howard	Massachusetts	1692
Elizabeth Howe	Massachusetts	1692
Frances Hutchins	Massachusetts	1692
Anne Hutchinson	Massachusetts	1640
Mary Ingham	Massachusetts	1676
Mary Leach Ireson	Massachusetts	1692
John Jackson Jr.	Massachusetts	1692
John Jackson Sr.	Massachusetts	1692
George Jacobs Jr.	Massachusetts	1692
George Jacobs Sr.	Massachusetts	1692
Margaret Jacobs	Massachusetts	1692
Rebecca Jacobs	Massachusetts	1692
Jane James	Massachusetts	1650
Jane Jenkins	Virginia	1675
Margaret Jennings	Connecticut	1659
Nicholas Jennings	Connecticut	1659
Abigail Johnson	Massachusetts	1692
Elizabeth Dane Johnson	Massachusetts	1692
Mary Johnson	Connecticut	1648
Rebecca Johnson	Massachusetts	1692
Johnson, Stephen Johnson	Massachusetts	1692
Hannah Walford Jones	New Hampshire	1682
Margaret Jones	Massachusetts	1647
Thomas Jones	Massachusetts	1648
Elizabeth Holly Kendall	Massachusetts	1648
Mrs. Roger Knapp	Connecticut	1653
Mary Lacy	Massachusetts	1692
Alice Lake	Massachusetts	1650
Mary Lee	Maryland	1654
Jane Lilly	Massachusetts	1692
Mrs. Richard Manship	Maryland	1654
Mercy Marshfield	Massachusetts	1649
Mary Osgood Marston	Massachusetts	1692
Susannah Martin	Massachusetts	1692
Margaret Mattson	Pennsylvania	1683
William Meaker	Connecticut	1657
Sarah Merrick	Massachusetts	1651
Katherine Messenger	Connecticut	1678
Goodwife Miller	Connecticut	1692
Joan Mitchell	Maryland	1660
Phyllis Money	Virginia	1694
Sarah Morey	Massachusetts	1692
Eleanor Morris	Virginia	1695
Elizabeth Morse	Massachusetts	1680
Mrs. Christopher Neal	Virginia	1671
Rebecca Nurse	Massachusetts	1692
Mary Oliver	Massachusetts	1650
Sarah Osborne	Massachusetts	1692
Mary Osgood	Massachusetts	1692
Elizabeth Paine	Massachusetts	1692
Catherine Palmer	Connecticut	1648
Alice Parker	Massachusetts	1692
Mary Parker	Massachusetts	1692
Sarah Parker	Massachusetts	1692
Hugh Parsons	Massachusetts	1651
John Parsons	Massachusetts	1674
Mary Parsons	Massachusetts	1651
Samuel Passanauton	Massachusetts	1692
Robert Pease	Massachusetts	1692
Sarah Pease	Massachusetts	1692
Joanna Penny	Massachusetts	1692
Elizabeth Perkins	Massachusetts	1653
Joanna Post	Massachusetts	1692
Mary Post	Massachusetts	1692
Susannah Post	Massachusetts	1692
Abel Powell	Massachusetts	1680
Caleb Powell	Massachusetts	1680
Mary Prescott	New Hampshire	1680
Margaret Prince	Massachusetts	1692
Benjamin Proctor	Massachusetts	1692
Elizabeth Proctor	Massachusetts	1692
John Proctor	Massachusetts	1692
Sarah Proctor	Massachusetts	1692
William Proctor	Massachusetts	1692
Ann Pudeator	Massachusetts	1692
Mary Randall	Massachusetts	1691
Margaret Read	Massachusetts	1680
Wilmot Redd	Massachusetts	1692
Sarah Rist	Massachusetts	1692
Welthian Richards	Massachusetts	1653
Elizabeth Richardson	Maryland	1658
Mistress Robinson	Virginia	1659
Susanna Rootes	Massachusetts	1692
Abigail Rowe	Massachusetts	1692
Mary Rowe	Massachusetts	1692
John Sadie Jr.	Massachusetts	1692
Henry Salter	Massachusetts	1692
Nathaniel Saltonstall	Massachusetts	1692
Andrew Sanford	Connecticut	1662
Mary Sanford	Connecticut	1662
Elizabeth Scargen	Massachusetts	1692
Margaret Scott	Massachusetts	1692
Elizabeth Seager	Connecticut	1662
Ann Sears	Massachusetts	1692
Bessie Sewell	Massachusetts	1651
Grace Sherwood	Virginia	1698
Henry Somers	Massachusetts	1692
Abigail Soames	Massachusetts	1692
Martha Sparks	Massachusetts	1691
Mary Staples	Connecticut	1654
Alice Stephens	Virginia	1668
Ephraim Stevens	Massachusetts	1692
Alice Stratton	Massachusetts	1650
Mary Harrington Taylor	Massachusetts	1692
Tituba	Massachusetts	1692
Margaret Toothaker	Massachusetts	1692
Mary Toothaker	Massachusetts	1692
Roger Toothaker	Massachusetts	1692
Isabella Towle	New Hampshire	1680
Joanna Towne	Massachusetts	1692
Hannah Travall	New York	1683
Job Tuckey	Massachusetts	1692
Hannah Tyler	Massachusetts	1692
Joanna Tyler	Massachusetts	1692
Mary Tyler	Massachusetts	1692
Hezekiah Usher Jr.	Massachusetts	1692
Judith Varlet	Connecticut	1662
Rachel Vinson	Massachusetts	1692
Sarah Vinson	Massachusetts	1653
James Wakeley	Connecticut	1662
Jane Walford	Maine	1648
George Walton	New Hampshire	1682
Mercy Wardwell	Massachusetts	1692
Samuel Wardwell	Massachusetts	1692
Sarah Wardwell	Massachusetts	1692
Mary Warren	Massachusetts	1692
Mary Watkins	Massachusetts	1693
Mary Webster	Massachusetts	1683
Thomas Wells	Massachusetts	1669
Judith White	Massachusetts	1692
Mary Whittridge	Massachusetts	1692
Sarah Averill Wildes	Massachusetts	1692
Ruth Wilford	Massachusetts	1691
John Willard	Massachusetts	1692
Robert Williams	Massachusetts	1669
Sarah Wilson	Massachusetts	1692
Barbara Wingborough	Virginia	1657
Edward Wooland	Massachusetts	1692
Joan Wright	Virginia	1626
Mary Wright	New York	1660
Alse Young	Connecticut	1647

== Notable members ==
- Karen Batchelor, lawyer and genealogist

== See also ==
- The Hereditary Society Community of the United States of America
- Witch trials
