= Timeline of the Salem witch trials =

This timeline of the Salem witch trials is a quick overview of the events.

== Preceding the initial outbreak ==
1688

The behavior of several children in the home of the Goodwin family in Boston results in the accusation, trial and execution of their Irish washerwoman, Ann Glover (also known as "Goody Glover"), for witchcraft.

1689

Cotton Mather publishes "Memorable Providences, Relating to Witchcrafts and Possessions", which includes his account of the Goodwins and Glover.

November: Samuel Parris is named the new minister of Salem. Parris moves to Salem from Boston, where Memorable Providences was published.

1691

October 16: Villagers vow to drive Parris out of Salem and stop contributing to his salary.

== Outbreak of accusations ==
=== 1692 ===
January 20: Eleven-year-old Abigail Williams and nine-year-old Elizabeth Parris begin behaving much as the Goodwin children acted three years earlier. Soon Ann Putnam Jr. and other Salem girls begin acting similarly.

Mid-February: A local doctor (historically assumed to be Doctor Griggs), attends to the "afflicted" girls, and first suggests that witchcraft may be the cause.

Around February 25: Mary Sibly (or Sibley), a neighbor of the Parris family, instructs John Indian, the husband of Tituba, to make a "witch cake" of rye meal and the girls' urine to feed to a dog in order to discover who is bewitching the girls, according to English folk "white magic" practices. She later is called out by Rev. Parris for this and her expression of regret is accepted by the congregation. Pressured by ministers and townspeople to say who caused her odd behavior, Elizabeth Parris identifies Tituba. The girls later accuse Sarah Osborne and Sarah Good of witchcraft.

February 29: Based on formal complaints from Joseph Hutchinson, Thomas Putnam, Edward Putnam and Thomas Preston, Magistrates John Hathorne and Jonathan Corwin issue warrants to arrest Sarah Good, Sarah Osborne and Tituba for afflicting Elizabeth Parris, Abigail Williams, Ann Putnam Jr. and Elizabeth Hubbard.

March 1–March 7: Magistrates John Hathorne and Jonathan Corwin interrogate Good, Osborne and Tituba over the course of several days. Tituba confesses to afflicting and confirms Good and Osborne are her co-conspirators.

March 11: Ann Putnam Jr. shows symptoms of affliction by witchcraft. Mercy Lewis, Mary Walcott and Mary Warren later alleged affliction as well.

March 12: Ann Putnam Jr. accuses Martha Corey of witchcraft.

March 19: Abigail Williams accuses Rebecca Nurse as a witch.

March 21: Magistrates Hathorne and Corwin examine Martha Corey.

March 23: Salem Marshal Deputy Samuel Brabrook arrests four-year-old Dorothy Good.

March 24: Corwin and Hathorne examine Rebecca Nurse and Dorothy Good.

March 26: John Hathorne, Jonathan Corwin and Rev. John Higginson question Dorothy Good, now in jail.

March 28: Elizabeth Proctor is accused of witchcraft.

April 3: Sarah Cloyce, after defending her sister, Rebecca Nurse, is accused of witchcraft.

April 11: Sarah Cloyce and Elizabeth Proctor are examined before Deputy Governor Thomas Danforth and members of the Governor's Council. On the same day Elizabeth's husband, John Proctor, becomes the first man accused of witchcraft and is jailed.

Early April: The Proctors' servant and accuser, Mary Warren, admits to lying and accuses the other girls of lying.

April 13: Ann Putnam Jr. accuses Giles Corey of witchcraft and alleges that a man who died at Corey's house also haunts her.

April 19: Abigail Hobbs, Bridget Bishop, Giles Corey and Mary Warren are examined. Deliverance Hobbs confesses to practicing witchcraft. Mary Warren, under pressure and accused now of witchcraft herself, reverses her statement made in early April and rejoins the accusers.

April 22: Mary Eastey, who defended her sister Rebecca Nurse, is examined by Hathorne and Corwin. Hathorne and Corwin also examine Nehemiah Abbott, Jr., Sarah Wildes, William and Deliverance Hobbs, Edward and Sarah Bishop, Mary Black and Mary English.

April 30: Several girls accuse former Salem minister George Burroughs of witchcraft.

May 2: Hathorne and Corwin examine Sarah Morey, Lyndia Dustin, Susannah Martin and Dorcas Hoar.

May 4: George Burroughs is arrested in Maine and sent back to Salem three days later and subsequently jailed.

May 9: Corwin and Hathorne examine George Burroughs and Sarah Churchill; Burroughs is moved to a Boston jail.

May 10: Corwin and Hathorne examine George Jacobs, Sr. and his granddaughter Margaret Jacobs. Sarah Osborne dies in prison.

May 14: The Rev. Increase Mather and Sir William Phips, the newly appointed governor of the colony, arrive in Boston. They bring with them a new charter establishing the Province of Massachusetts Bay.

May 18: Mary Eastey is released from prison. Following protests by her accusers, she is re-arrested. Roger Toothaker is also arrested on charges of witchcraft.

May 27: Governor William Phips issues a commission for a Court of Oyer and Terminer and appoints as judges John Hathorne, Nathaniel Saltonstall, Bartholomew Gedney, Peter Sergeant, Samuel Sewall, Wait Still Winthrop and Lieutenant Governor William Stoughton.

May 31: Hathorne, Corwin and Gedney examine Martha Carrier, John Alden, Wilmot Redd, Elizabeth Howe and Phillip English. Alden and English later escape from prison and do not return.

=== Formal prosecutions ===
June 2: Bridget Bishop is the first to be formally indicted, tried and convicted of witchcraft. She is sentenced to death.

June 10: Bridget Bishop is hanged at Gallows Hill.

June 16: Roger Toothaker dies in prison.

June 28–29: Sarah Good is tried and found guilty.

June 29: Susannah Martin and Rebecca Nurse are tried and found guilty.

June 30: Elizabeth Howe is tried and found guilty.

July 2: Sarah Wildes is tried and found guilty.

July 19: Sarah Good, Susannah Martin, Rebecca Nurse, Elizabeth Howe, and Sarah Wildes are executed by hanging at Gallows Hill in Salem.

August 3: Martha Carrier is tried and found guilty.

August 4: George Jacobs Sr. and John Willard are tried and found guilty.

August 5: George Burroughs, Elizabeth Proctor, and John Proctor are tried and found guilty.

August 19: Martha Carrier, George Jacobs Sr., John Willard, George Burroughs, and John Proctor are hanged on Gallows Hill. Elizabeth Proctor is temporarily spared execution because she is pregnant.

September 6: Dorcas Hoar is tried and found guilty.

September 7: Alice Parker and Ann Pudeator are tried and found guilty.

September 8: Martha Corey is tried and found guilty.

September 9: Mary Bradbury and Mary Eastie are tried and found guilty.

September 14: Samuel Wardwell and Wilmot Redd are tried and found guilty.

September 16: Mary Parker and Margaret Scott are tried and found guilty.

September 17: Abigail Faulker Sr. is tried and found guilty. Margaret Scott, Wilmot Redd, Samuel Wardwell, Mary Parker, and Abigail Faulkner are sentenced to hang. Abigail Faulkner is given a temporary stay of execution because she is pregnant. Rebecca Earnes, Mary Lacy Sr., Ann Foster and Abigail Hobbs plead guilty to the charges and await sentencing.

September 19: Giles Corey is pressed to death for refusing to agree to be tried "before God and the Country" (i.e., a jury).

September 21: Several ministers successfully petition the Court to postpone Dorcas Hoar's execution to give her time to repent.

September 22: Martha Corey, Mary Eastey, Alice Parker, Ann Pudeator, Margaret Scott, Wilmot Redd, Samuel Wardwell, and Mary Parker are hanged. Mary Bradbury has escaped and is not hanged.

October 3: The Rev. Increase Mather, President of Harvard College and father of Cotton Mather, denounces the use of spectral evidence.

October 6: Eight children in custody are released on £2500 bail.

October 12: Governor Phips writes to the Privy Council of King William and Queen Mary saying that he has stopped the proceedings and referring to "what danger some of their innocent subjects might be exposed to, if the evidence of the afflicted persons only did prevail," i.e., "spectral evidence".

October 29: Phips prohibits further arrests, releases many of the accused from prison, and dissolves the Court of Oyer and Terminer.

December 16: An act is passed for the establishment of a Superior Court of Assizes and General Gaole Delivery, to convene in January and prosecute the remaining people in custody.

=== 1693 ===
January 4: Sarah Buckley, Margaret Jacobs, Rebecca Jacobs, and Mary Whittredge are tried and found not guilty.

January 5: Job Tookey and Hannah Tyler are tried and found not guilty.

January 6: Mary Marston, Elizabeth Johnson Sr., and Abigail Barker are tried and found not guilty.

January 7: Mary Tyler is tried and found not guilty.

January 9: Rebecca Johnson is cleared by proclamation.

January 10: Sarah Wardwell is tried and found guilty. Her two daughters, Sarah Hawkes and Mercy Wardwell, are tried and found not guilty.

January 11: Elizabeth Johnson Jr. is tried and found guilty. Mary Black is cleared by proclamation.

January 12: Mary Post is tried and found guilty. Mary Bridges Sr., Hannah Post, Sarah Bridges, and Mary Osgood are tried and found not guilty. Thomas Farrar Sr. is cleared by proclamation.

January 13: Mary Lacy Jr. is tried and found not guilty.

February 1: Sarah Cole (of Lynn), Lydia Dustin, Sarah Dustin, Mary Taylor, and Mary Toothaker are tried and found not guilty. Lydia Dustin is not released because she is unable to pay her jailer's fees.

February 3: Jane Lilly cleared by proclamation.

February 21: Governor Phips writes to England that fifty-three people have already been cleared, failing to be indicted by grand juries or found not guilty at trial, and that he has vacated the death sentences of those who have been sentenced to be executed.

March 10: Lydia Dustin dies in custody.

April 25: John Alden is cleared by proclamation.

May 10: Susannah Post, Eunice Frye, Mary Bridges Jr., Mary Barker, and William Barker Jr. are tried and found not guilty. Sarah Cole (of Salem), Dorothy Faulkner, Abigail Faulkner Jr., Martha Tyler, Johannah Tyler, Sarah Wilson Sr., and Sarah Wilson Jr. are cleared by proclamation. A grand jury fails to indict Tituba.

May 11: William Hobbs is cleared by proclamation.

== Aftermath ==
1697

January 14: The General Court declared a Day of Contrition for the hysteria and false accusations, for which there was fasting and praying for forgiveness.

1700

Abigail Faulkner, Sr. requests that the Massachusetts General Court reverse the attainder on her name.

1706

Ann Putnam Jr. stands before her church and offers an apology for her part in the witch trials.

== See also ==
- Timeline of Salem, Massachusetts
