= Margaret Scott (Salem witch trials) =

American convicted of witchcraft and executed

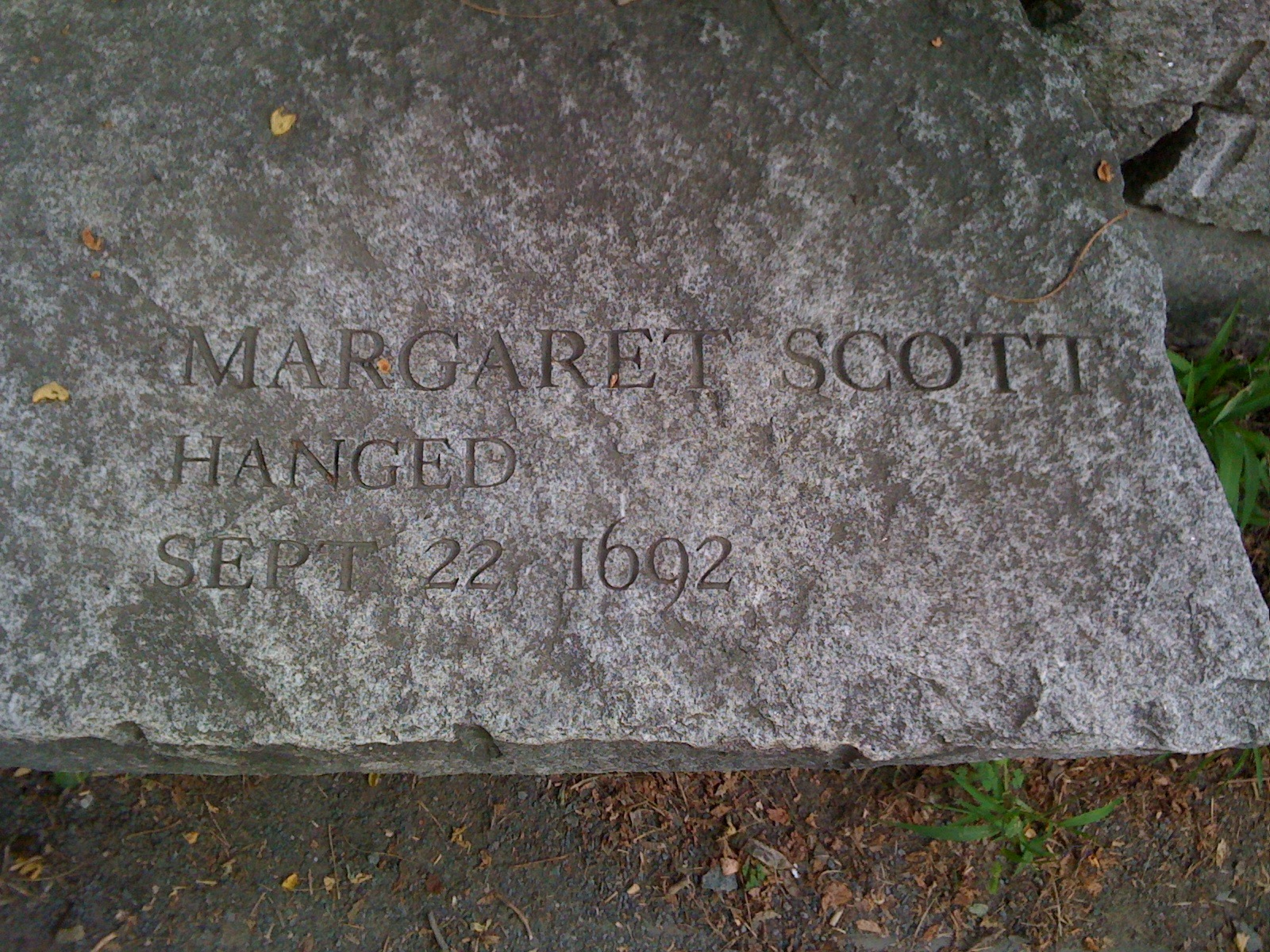
- Margaret Scott's Memorial Bench
- Born: Margaret Stephenson; March 28, 1616; Marlack, Somerset, England
- Died: September 22, 1692 (aged 76–77); Salem Village, Province of Massachusetts Bay
- Cause of death: Execution by hanging
- Occupation: Housewife
- Known for: Convicted of witchcraft in the Salem witch trials
- Spouse: Benjamin Scott (d. 1671)

Margaret Scott (née Stephenson; March 28, 1616 – October 2, 1692 [O.S. September 22, 1692]) was found guilty of witchcraft during the Salem witch trials and was executed by hanging on September 22, 1692. She was part of the last group to be executed, which also included Mary Eastey, Martha Corey, Ann Pudeator, Samuel Wardwell, Mary Parker, Alice Parker, and Wilmot Redd. She was the only accused person from Rowley to be executed. As a lower-class, long-term widow, having lost several children in infancy, she was a prototypical witch candidate. When her husband, Benjamin, died, he left a very small estate and she, being unable to remarry, was reduced to begging, which invited resentment and suspicion. In this manner, her circumstances were comparable to fellow victim Sarah Good.

== Early life ==
Margaret was born in England, on March 28, 1616, likely migrating to the colonies with her parents. From the status of her future husband, it is most probable that they were a lower class family. The first record of her in America is her marriage to Benjamin Scott in 1642. They had seven children, though only three survived to adulthood. (Note: It was then a common perception that witches had difficulty rearing children.) The town of Rowley granted Benjamin land in 1664. Shortly after, he was declared a freeman. A man by the same name (presumably the same man) was fined and "admonished" for theft. Benjamin died in 1671, leaving an estate of only 67 pounds and 17 shillings, which would have to support Margaret and her family for the rest of her life, as she never remarried. Consequently, she was reduced to begging.

== Salem witch trials ==
=== Accusation and arrest ===
Margaret was arrested late in the course of the events, as part of the Andover witch hunt. Mary Walcott and Ann Putnam, Jr. had been brought to Andover on June 11 and again on July 26 to initiate and perpetuate the witch hunt there. Margaret's primary accusers were the two most prominent families in Rowley, the Nelsons and the Wycombs.

=== Examination ===
Margaret's examination took place on August 5, 1692. It is probable she had been arrested the previous day. One of the "confessed" witches, recorded only as "M. G.", claimed that she and Margaret had turned invisible to hit Captain Wycomb with a stick, an event which he corroborated. When Margaret denied having done this, M. G. was incredulous and reaffirmed her accusation.

Margaret was indicted on charges of witchcraft, against 17-year-old Frances Wycomb and 19-year-old Mary Daniel, unmarried women from Rowley. Daniel was a servant girl in the household of Rev. Edward Payson.

=== Trial ===
Her trial took place in September. On September 15, Frances Wycomb testified that Margaret had begun tormenting her "by choaking [sic] and almost presing [sic] me to death" shortly after the witchcraft hysteria had begun at Salem and that she had continued to do so until the present. Ann Putnam, Jr. and Mary Warren claimed to have witnessed this torture. Mary Warren and Elizabeth Hubbard testified that they had witnessed the torture of Mary Daniel. Sarah Coleman, from Newbury, swore that Margaret had recently afflicted her three or four times, "by pricking, pinching, and choaking of me" [sic]. Mary Daniel went into great detail about how Margaret had tormented her, and also mentioned Elizabeth Jackson as having appeared with her.

I was taken very ill again all over & felt a great pricking in ye soles of my feet, and after a while I saw apparently the shape of Margret Scott, who, as I was sitting in a chair by ye fire pulled me with ye chair, down backward to ye ground, and tormented and pinched me very much, and I saw her go away at ye door, in which fit I was dumb and so continued till ye next morning, finding a great load and heaviness upon my tongue.

— Mary Daniel

Much of the evidence entered against her was from events that had happened five or ten years previous. Phillip and Sarah Nelson testified that Robert Shilleto (by then deceased, so he could not affirm or deny the story) had repeatedly complained that Margaret was a witch, afflicting him until he died. Jonathan Burbank, Captain Daniel Wycomb and Frances Wycomb testified that Margaret had come to Burbank's house, asking for corn from his field. (By this time, she had long been widowed.) Burbank initially asked her to wait until he retrieved it from his field, but when she persisted, his wife gave her some. Later, when he went to get some more corn out of the field, his oxen refused to move, which he attributed to Margaret's bewitching of them. Similarly, Thomas Nelson testified that Margaret repeatedly came to him for wood, for payment of a debt he owed to her. After he denied her, two of his cows died, which he and his neighbors considered unnatural, causing him to conclude Margaret was a witch.

These last two examples highlight a phenomenon commonly seen in witch hunts, which historians call "refusal guilt syndrome". This occurs when people who refuse beggars feel guilt about doing so, and instead of admitting this, they vilify the person that caused them to feel guilty.

Margaret maintained her innocence throughout the process, but was found guilty on September 17, 1692, and sentenced to be executed.

=== Execution ===
She was executed by hanging on Thursday, September 22, 1692, with seven others. Nicholas Noyes, officiating as clergyman, reportedly turned toward the suspended bodies of the victims and said, "What a sad thing it is to see eight firebrands of hell hanging there." Sir William Phips soon shut down the trials and this was the last group to be executed. Eventually, all of the remaining accused people were released, except for those who had died in custody.

== Aftermath ==
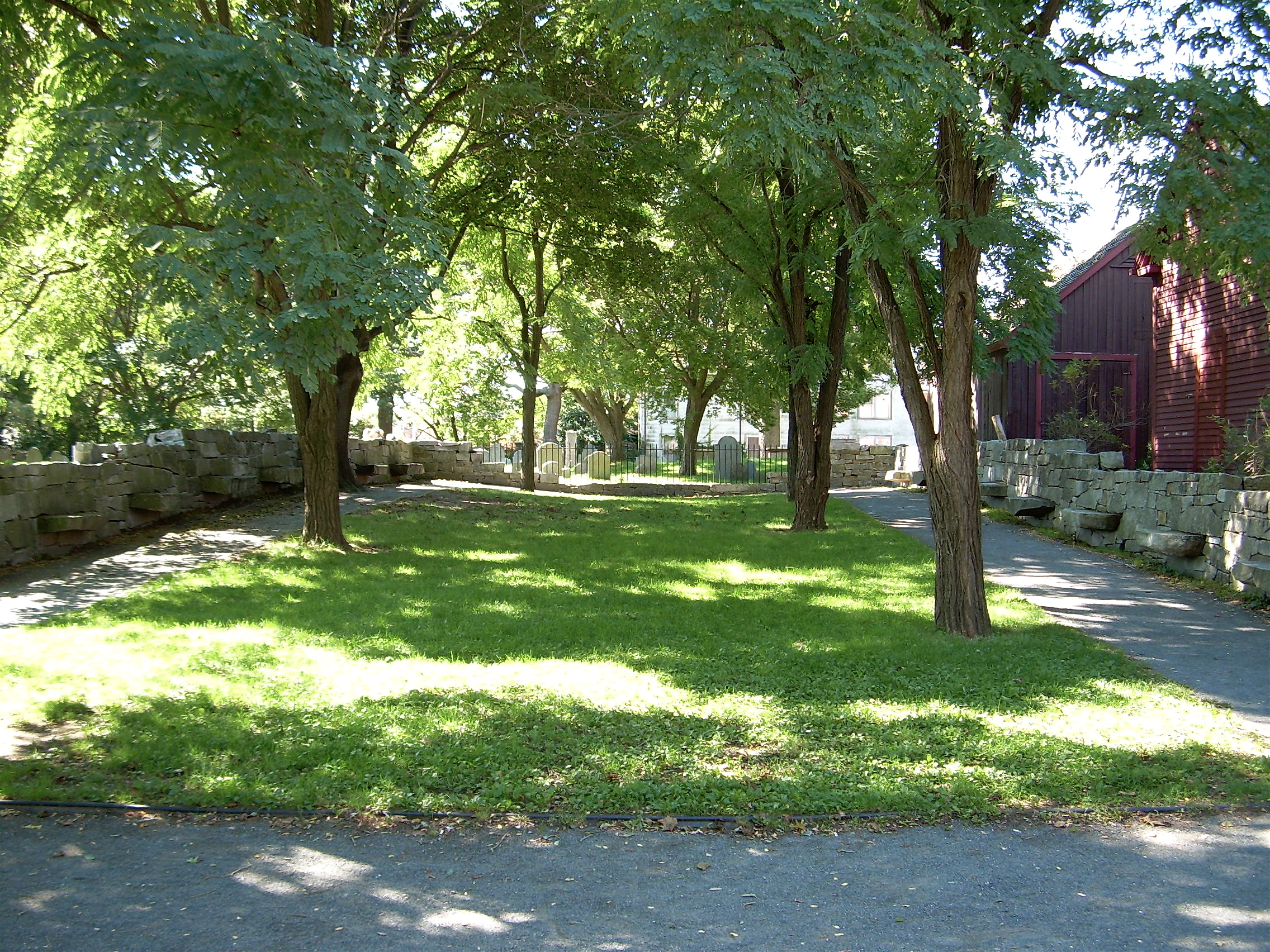
The Salem Witch Trials Memorial Park in Salem

Margaret Scott has a memorial bench at the Salem Witch Trials Memorial, along with the rest of the men and women who were executed. Arthur Miller, who wrote The Crucible, a play based on the trials, spoke at the dedication, as did Nobel Laureate Elie Wiesel. She also has a memorial stone monument in Rowley, where she lived.

She was officially exonerated by name on October 31, 2001 (Halloween), more than three centuries after her trial and execution. Most of the accused witches had been exonerated in the early 18th century, but some families, including Margaret's, did not come forward at that time. In 1957, Ann Pudeator was singled out as being exonerated along with "certain other persons", but it took almost another fifty years for the last five victims to be explicitly named. Paul Tirone, a state representative at the time whose wife is a descendant of Sarah Wildes, helped to pass the act. He said, "These people were victims of hysteria, and they paid deeply with their lives."

In March 2012, her original indictment was sold at a New York auction for $26,000. It was the first Salem witch trial document to be sold in 30 years.

The January 10, 2023, episode of Finding Your Roots discussed the case with actress Claire Danes, who is a ninth great-granddaughter of Margaret Scott.
