= Sarah Wildes =

American convicted of witchcraft and executed

Sarah Averill Wildes
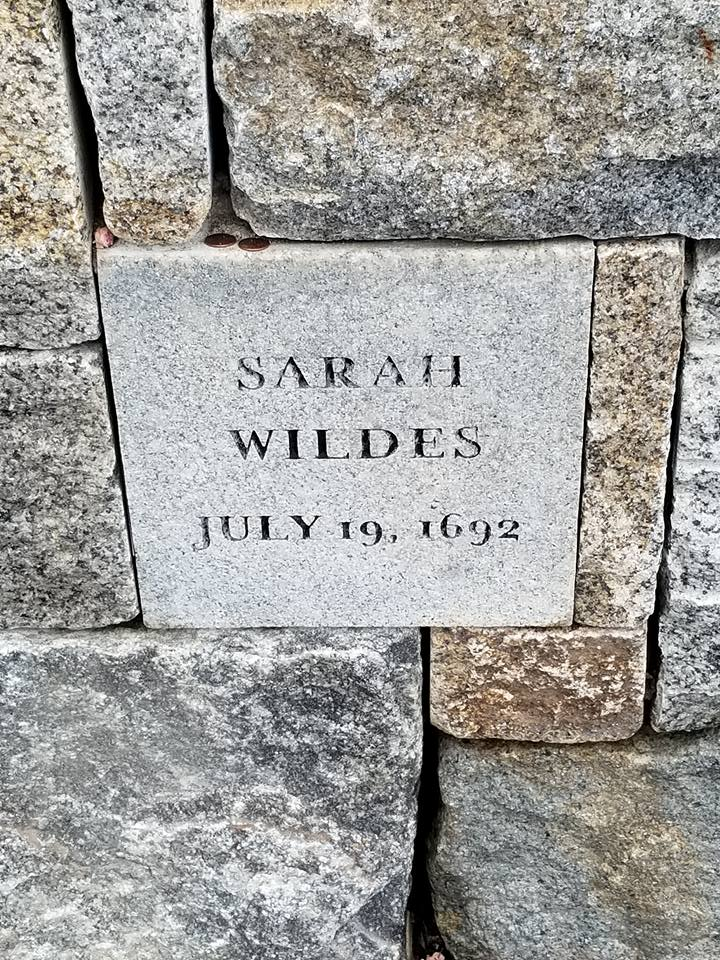
- Sarah Wildes' Memorial Marker
- Born: Sarah Averill; Bapt. March 16, 1627; Chipping Norton, England
- Died: July 19, 1692 (aged 65); Salem Village, Province of Massachusetts Bay
- Cause of death: Execution by hanging
- Occupation: Housewife
- Known for: Convicted of witchcraft in the Salem witch trials
- Spouse: John Wildes (died 14 May 1705)
- Children: Ephraim Wildes
- Parents: William Averell (father); Abigail Hynton (mother)

Sarah Wildes (née Averell/Averill; baptized March 16, 1627 – July 29, 1692 [O.S. July 19, 1692]) was wrongly convicted of witchcraft during the Salem witch trials and was executed by hanging. She maintained her innocence throughout the process, and was later exonerated. Her husband's first wife was a member of the Gould family, cousins of the Putnam family, the primary accusers, and court records document the family feuds which led to her persecution.

== Family ==
Sarah was one of seven children born to William Averell (Note: William is known to have spelled his name, Averell, with a second "e", notably in the signature on his will, although his children and descendants often spelled the name Averill. He was also called "Avery" in some town records, and some of his descendants settled on that variation of the surname.) and Abigail Hynton, immigrants from Chipping Norton, England who settled in Ipswich, Massachusetts. William was a bailiff in Chipping Norton in 1634, and Ipswich town records first mention him in 1637, which brackets their migration to the intervening time period, when Sarah was around 7–10 years old.

Sarah married English immigrant John Wildes (born c. 1615–1618 (Note: John self-reported his age as 17 as of 11 Apr 1635, when he registered for his voyage to New England. Later, 30 November 1677, he was said to be 62 years of age.)), a widower with eight children, and had a son, Ephraim. Ephraim held the positions of town treasurer and constable during the period of the conspiracy. They were residents of Topsfield, a neighboring town of Salem, in the Massachusetts Bay Colony. John held several positions in the town government and was affectionately called "Old Father Wildes". Two of John's daughters, Sarah (Wildes) Bishop and Phoebe (Wildes) Day, and a son-in-law, Edward Bishop Jr., were also accused of witchcraft. Sarah Averill Wildes and Sarah Wildes Bishop, her stepdaughter, have often been confused (as have Sarah Wildes Bishop and Bridget Bishop).

One of Sarah's stepsons, Jonathan, was known for strange behavior, which local ministers theorized could be mental distraction, possession by the devil, or fakery, a story that Rev. John Hale related during Sarah's trial, retrospectively considering it to be possible evidence of Sarah's witchcraft. Jonathan died in King Philip's War, and no resolution was ever reached.

Hale also related the story of another stepson, John, (Note: John and Jonathan are distinct names and it was not uncommon for siblings to have these names in those days.) who had also died young (and was, therefore, not around to substantiate or refute the story). John, portrayed as "an honest young man" went to the house of his uncle and aunt, the Reddingtons, to confide in them his belief that his stepmother was, indeed, a witch.

Sarah's older brother, William Averill Jr., who had held several prominent positions in Ipswich and Topsfield, died the year before Sarah's arrest and was therefore unable to come to her defense. William and John Wildes (Sr.) had served together as selectmen. Sarah and John had also been the witnesses to William's will, demonstrating a relationship of trust.

== Prior offences and feuds ==
Sarah had a reputation as a nonconformist in Puritan Massachusetts, with prior offences which may have made her an easy target for accusations of witchcraft. She was considered glamorous and forward as a young woman. She was sentenced to be whipped for fornication with Thomas Wordell in November 1649, and later, in May of 1663, charged with wearing a silk scarf.

Because she married John so soon after his first wife's death (about 7 months later), John's former in-laws held something of a grudge against her. This is particularly notable as the Goulds were related to the Putnam family, who were the principal accusers in the witchcraft hysteria. John Wildes testified against his first wife's brother, Lieutenant John Gould, in a treason trial, which further angered the family. Shortly after, John's ex-sister-in-law, Mary Gould Reddington, began circulating rumors that Sarah was a witch. When John Wildes threatened to charge her with slander, she retracted her claims. John testified that William Averill followed up, testing Mary's sincerity by offering to round up his sister himself if she had any complaints against Sarah, and Mary again said she had nothing against her.

In 1674, the brothers John and Joseph Andrews came to the Wildes house to borrow a scythe, as theirs had broken. John Wildes Sr. was away and Sarah replied that she did not have one to lend, but a neighbor pointed them to John Wildes Jr.'s, and they took it against Sarah's protests, promising to ask the younger John's permission. Ephraim, then a young boy, allegedly chased after them, saying that it would be a "death scythe" for them if they did not return it. After cutting their hay, they had a series of mishaps with their cart and oxen, which they attributed to Sarah's bewitching. Later, Elizabeth Simmons née Andrews, their sister, and their mother went to visit the Reddingtons and crossed paths with Sarah. Their mother confronted her with the story of her sons' troubles, and Sarah said she had nothing to do with it. When their mother persisted, Sarah insisted on her proving that she had a hand in it. Elizabeth then claimed to have been immediately affected by trembling joints when Sarah looked at her, and that a cat-like creature visited her that night, while she was struck dumb. She further claimed to have suffered crippling back pain when Sarah passed her at church.

Ephraim testified that he had been engaged to Elizabeth Simmons' daughter, which he broke off after confronting Mrs. Simmons about rumors he had heard of her complaints about his mother (which she denied), and that she had been angry with him ever since.

Thomas Dorman reported that Sarah had purchased a beehive from him, and, subsequently, he lost much of his livestock, including geese and cattle. During the events of 1692, Ann Putnam Jr. told his wife that their cattle had been killed by Sarah Wildes, which he found remarkable as they had frozen to death in January 1686.

Another source of contention was John's position as surveyor for Topsfield. Border disputes between Salem and Topsfield came out in Topsfield's favor.

== Salem witch trials ==
=== Arrest ===
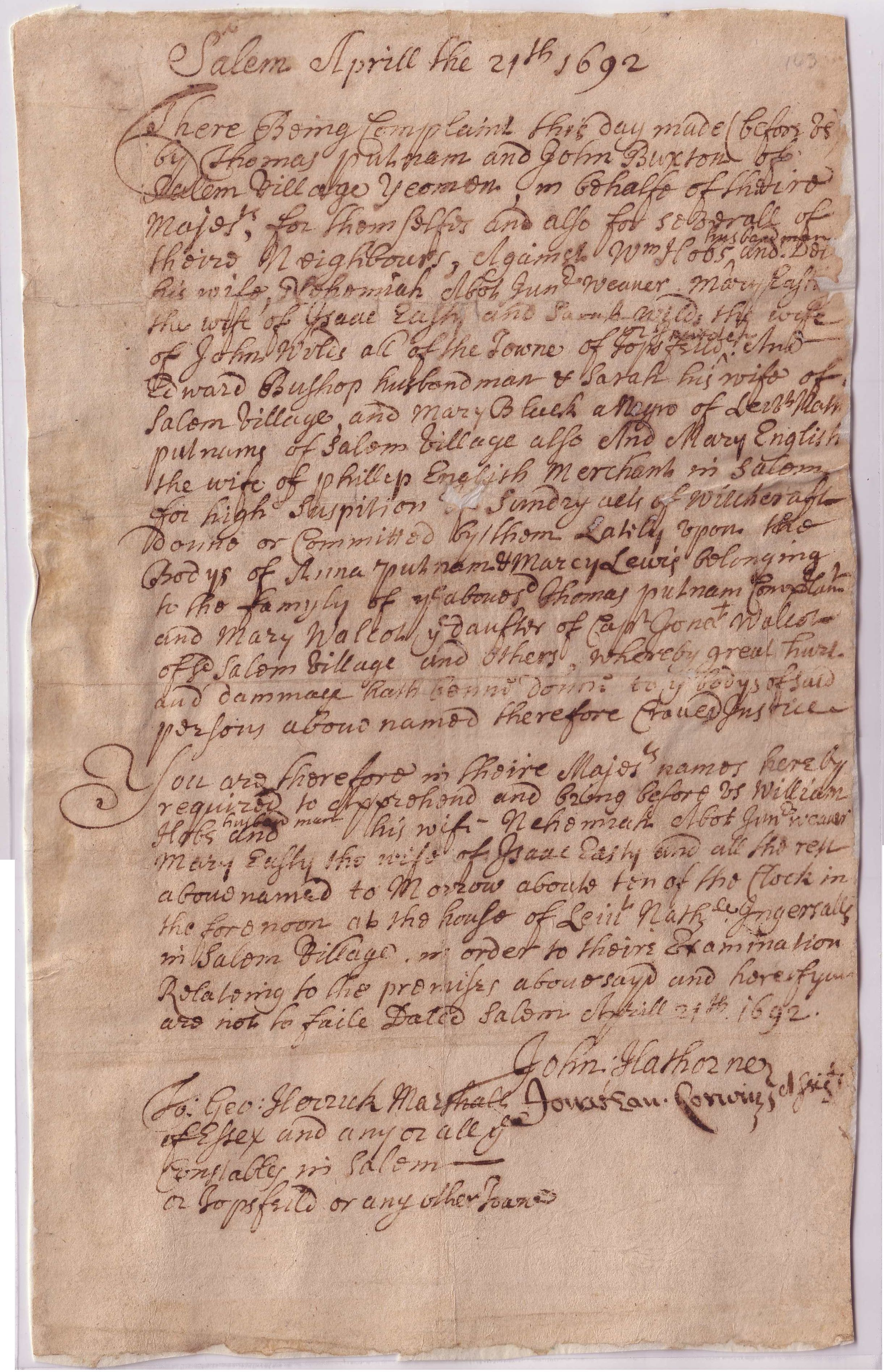
Sarah Wildes Arrest Warrant

On 21 April 1692, John Hathorne and Jonathan Corwin ordered Sarah, along with her stepdaughter, Sarah Wildes Bishop, Sarah Bishop's husband, Edward Bishop, and six others (William and Deliverance Hobbs, Nehemiah Abbot, Mary Eastey, Mary Black, and Mary English) to be arrested on "high suspicion" of witchcraft performed on Ann Putnam Jr., Mercy Lewis, Mary Walcott, and others, due to a complaint by Thomas Putnam and John Buxton.

Sarah was arrested by the Marshall, George Herrick, who then ordered Constable Ephraim Wildes to arrest Deliverance Hobbs. Hobbs, whether through coercion or not, made a jailhouse confession and implicated Sarah Wildes as a witch. Ephraim himself testified that he believed Hobbs' accusation to be vengeance against him for arresting her.

=== Examination ===
Her examination took place the following day. Sarah Bibber is specifically named in the court records as having had a fit, claiming to see Sarah's specter "upon the beam", and the other accusers followed suit. Ann Putnam Jr. later testified that she herself was tortured during Sarah's examination and that she witnessed the torture of Mary Walcott, Mercy Lewis, and Abigail Williams. Sarah stated her innocence, going as far as to say she had never even seen the accusers before. The old accusations by John's ex-sister-in-law, Mary Reddington ("John Herricks [step]mo[ther]"), resurfaced.

During her own examination, Deliverance Hobbs claimed that Sarah's apparition, along with that of Mercy Lewis, had previously "tore [her] almost to pieces [sic]" as she lay in her bed. She continued that Sarah recruited her to attend a black mass, and offered to cease tormenting her and reward her with clothing in return for her signing of the devil's book.

=== Incarceration ===
On 13 May 1692, Sarah was transferred to the Boston Gaol. She was transferred back to Salem on 18 June, along with George Burroughs, George Jacobs Sr., Giles and Martha Corey, Ann Pudeator, Sarah Cloyse, Sarah Root, and Dorcas Hoar. In his later request for restitution, Ephraim said that he or his father made trips to visit her once or twice a week, at great personal expense.

=== Trial ===
Along with Sarah Good, Rebecca Nurse, Susannah Martin, and Elizabeth Howe, Sarah Wildes was tried on 30 June 1692. The prosecution relied heavily on spectral evidence.

Mary Gould Reddington had died by the time of the trial, but her brother John and Rev. John Hale related her claims of witchcraft against herself and Sarah's own stepsons. Elizabeth Simmons, along with her brothers, John and Joseph Andrews, attested that they had been victimized. Humphrey Clark claimed that Sarah had once appeared in his bedroom at midnight. Thomas Dorman relayed the story about his geese and cattle.

Ann Putnam testified:

I have been afflected ever sence the beginning of march with a woman that told me her name was willds and that she came from Topsfeild but on the 22 April 1692 Sarah willd did most greviously torment me during the time of hir Examination and then I saw that Sarah willds was that very woman that tould me hir name was willds and also on the day of hir Examination I saw Sarah willds or hir Apperince most greviously tortor and afflect mary walcott, Mircy lewes and Abigail willia [ms] and severall times sence Sarah wilds or hirs Apperance has most greviously tortored and afflected me with variety of torturees as by pricking and pinching me and almost choaking me to death.

Mary Walcott similarly claimed:

in the beginning of Appril 1692 there came to me a woman which I did not know and she did most greviously torment me by pricking and pinching me and she tould me that hir name was wilds and that she lived at Topsfeil and hurting me most greviously by times tell the day of hir Examination which was the 22 day of Appril 1692: and then I saw that Sarah wildes was that very same woman that tould me hir name was wildes and sarah wilds did most greviously torment me dureing the time of hir Examination for when ever she did but look upon me she would strick me down or almost Choak me to death: also on the day or hir Examination I saw sarah Wilds or hir Apperance most greviously torment and afflect mercy lewes [s] Abigaill Williams and Ann putnam Jun'r by stricking them down and [almst] Choaking them to death. also severall times sence Sarah willds has most greviously tormented me with variety of tortor and I verily beleve she is a most dreadful wicth

Nathaniel Ingersoll and Thomas Putnam backed these claims by stating that they witnessed attacks on all of the afflicted girls.

In Sarah's defense, John and Ephraim testified to the ulterior motives of the Hobbs, Gould, and Simmons families. Ephraim said he had never seen his mother harm anyone in word nor action, and that she had always instructed him well in the Christian religion.

as for my mother I never saw aniey harm by har upon aniey sutch a cout naither in word nor action as she is now a cused for she hath awlwais in structed me well in the cristian religion and the wais of god ever sence I was abell to take in structions: and so I leve it allto this honred cort to consider of it

— Ephraim Wildes

Sarah Wildes was condemned by the Court of Essex County for practicing witchcraft. William Stoughton signed the warrant for execution on 12 July 1692.

=== Execution ===
Wildes was executed on July 19, 1692, by hanging at Gallows Hill in Salem, Massachusetts, along with Elizabeth Howe, Susannah Martin, Sarah Good, and Rebecca Nurse. Before the executions, Rev. Nicholas Noyes asked them to confess, but Good's last words were, "You are a liar! I am no more a witch than you are a wizard, and if you take away my life God will give you blood to drink."

When the site of the execution was finally confirmed in January 2016 by the Gallows Hill Project, led by Professor Emerson Baker of Salem State University, no human remains were found using ground-penetrating radar, supporting traditional beliefs that the families of the victims returned at night to recover their bodies and reinter them elsewhere.

== Aftermath ==
Stepdaughter Phoebe Wildes Day was arrested in September 1692, but there is no record of her going to trial. Stepdaughter Sarah Wildes Bishop and her husband, Edward, having been transferred to Boston prison, escaped in October 1692 and went into hiding.

In his book Wonders of the Invisible World, Cotton Mather attempted to defend his participation in the trials, laying out what he considered to be the strongest cases for genuine witchcraft. He did not include Sarah's.

On 26 June 1693, John Wildes married Mary, the widow of George Jacobs Sr. (George having been executed for witchcraft, as well). He died on 14 May 1705, in Topsfield.

=== Exoneration ===
Sarah was exonerated by the Massachusetts General Court in 1710, along with many other condemned. Her son Ephraim, responding that "the los of so dere a frind ... cannot be mede up" [sic], was awarded 14 pounds as restitution.

The husband of one of Sarah's descendants, State Representative Paul Tirone, was instrumental in clearing the last five victims by an act of Legislature on October 31, 2001 (Halloween).

=== Memorials ===
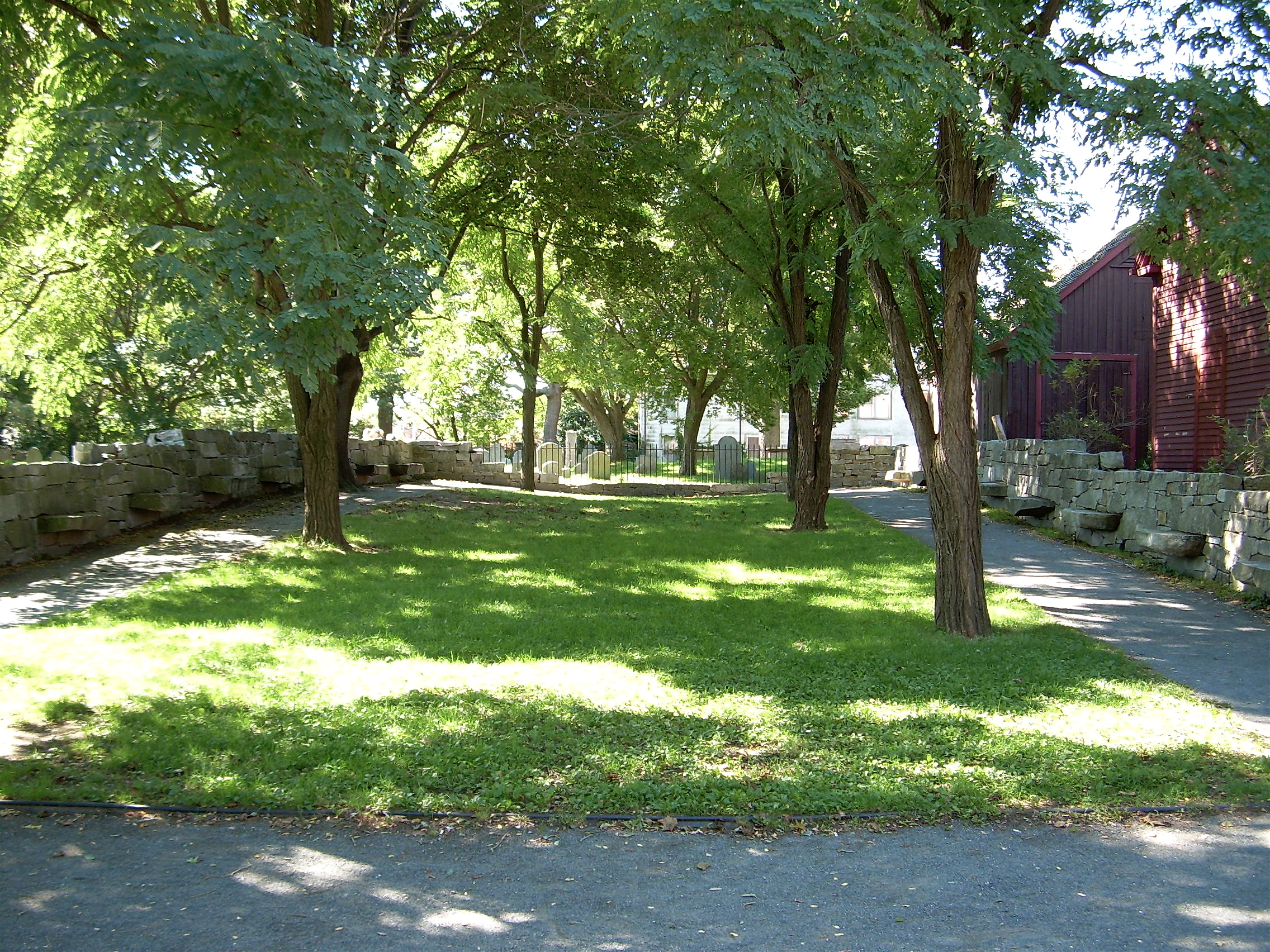
The Salem Witch Trials Memorial Park in Salem

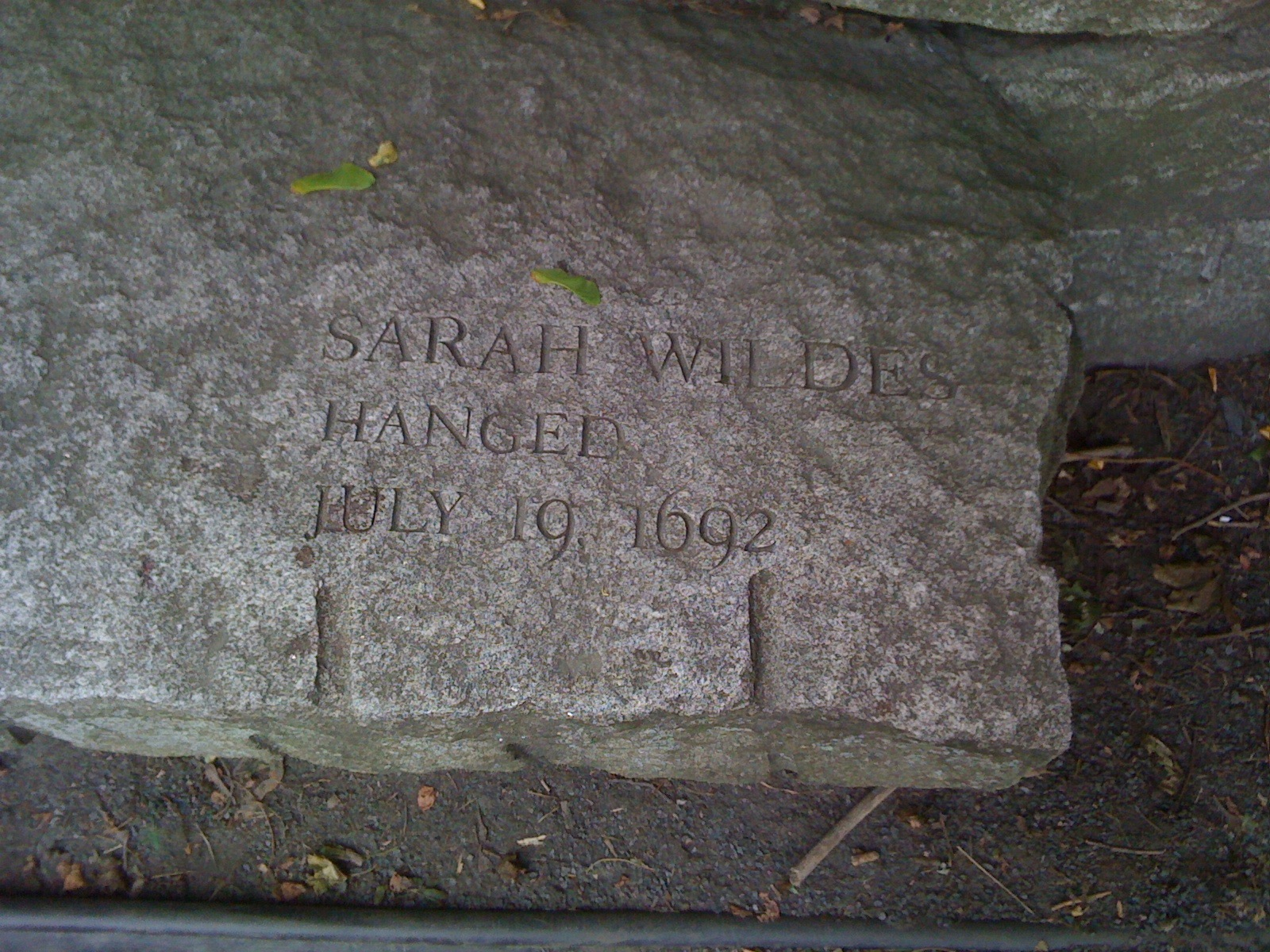
This is the memorial bench for Sarah Wildes at the Salem Witch Trials Memorial Park in Salem.

The Salem Witch Trials Memorial includes a bench inscribed with the names of all those executed, including Sarah Wildes. Arthur Miller, who wrote The Crucible, a play based on the trials, spoke at the dedication, as did Nobel Laureate and Holocaust survivor Elie Wiesel. The city of Danvers also created a memorial to the victims. The execution site was finally pinpointed in January 2016, by the University of Virginia's Gallows Hill Project, and the city plans to create a new memorial to the victims there.
