= Sarah Bibber =

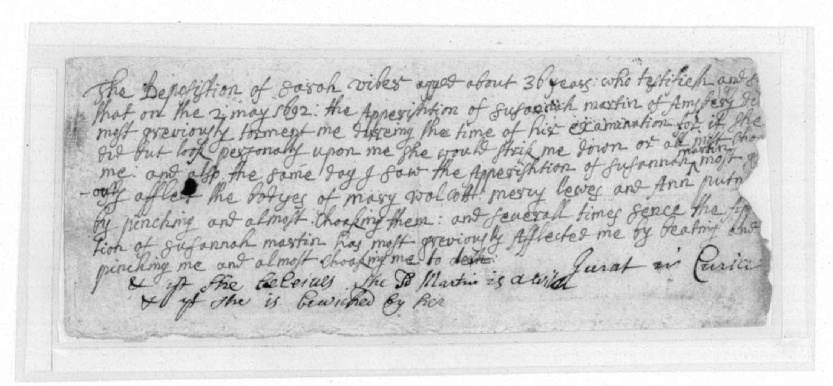
1692 deposition of Sarah Bibber (Viber) against Susannah Martin

Sarah Bibber (or Vibber or Vibert; born c. 1656 – year of death unknown) was involved in the infamous Salem witch trials in 1692, both as an accuser of witchcraft, as well as being accused of being a witch herself.

Bibber was one of the "afflicted" who testified against the accused in the Salem Witch Trials of 1692. She is mentioned in indictments, gave depositions and testified under oath against 15 people accused of witchcraft. These were Mary Bradbury, George Burroughs, Giles Corey, Mary Easty, Sarah Good, Dorcas Hoar, Elizabeth How, George Jacobs, Sr., Susannah Martin, Rebecca Nurse, Alice Parker, John Proctor, Ann Pudeator, Job Tookey and John Willard. She also was mentioned in the indictment of Mary Witheridge.

Others, including John and Lydia Porter, Joseph Fowler, Thomas and Mary Jacobs, Richard Walker and Sarah Nurse testified against Bibber, claiming that she was involved in witchcraft. In 1692 Bibber's age was given as being about 36 years old. She was married to John Bibber and they had a 4-year-old child. Various court documents list their town of residence as Salem or Wenham. Her surname is variously given in the documents as Bibber, Biber and Vibber.

Sarah Bibber v. Sarah Good:

The Deposition of Sarah Bibber aged about 36 years who testified and said that since I have been afflicted I have often seen the Apparition of Sarah Good but she did not hurt me tell the 2 day of May 1692 though I saw her Apparition most grievously torture Mercy Lewes & Jon. Indian at Salem. on the 11th April 1692: but on the 2: may 1692 the Apparition of Sarah good did most grievously torment me by pressing my breath almost out of my body and also she did immediately afflict my child by pinching of it that I could hardly hold it and my husband seeing of it took hold of the Child but it cried out and twisted so dreadfully by reason of the torture that the Apparition of Sarah good did afflict it with all that it got out of its fathers arms to: also several times since the Apparition of Sarah Good has most grievously tormented me by beating and pinching me and almost Choking me to death and pricking me with pins after a most dreadful manner

Sarah Bibber owned this her testimony to be the truth one the oath she had taken: be fore us the Jurors for Inquest: this: 28dy of June 1692

Sworn. in Court June 29th 1692.

And further Adds. that she very believes upon her Oath that Sarah Good had bewitched her

Bibber was described by those who testified against her as a "loose-tongued creature, addicted to fits," a woman who quarreled often with her husband when she would call him "very bad names," would have "strange fits when she was crossed," a woman of turbulent spirit and "double tongued." She was observed to be "very idle in her calling" and given to gossiping and making mischief among her neighbors.

The testimony of Thomas and Mary Jacobs against Bibber stated that

... Bibber would be very often speaking against one and another very obscenely and those things that were false and wishing very bad wishes and very often and she wish that when her child fell into the river that she had never pulled . ... her child out and Bibber use to wish ill wishes to herself and her children and also to others: the neighborhood where she lived amongst after she buried her first husband has told us that this John Bibber wife could fall into fits as often as she pleased.
