= Estey =

Estey may refer to:

- Estey (surname)
- Estey, Michigan, a civil township in Gladwin County
- Estey Hall (Philadelphia), a historic building in Philadelphia, Pennsylvania
- Estey Organ, a defunct American organ manufacturer
- Estey Tavern, a historic tavern in Middleton, Massachusetts

== See also ==
- Estée Lauder
- Easty
- Eastie (disambiguation)
