= Easty =

People with the surname Easty include:

- Isaac Easty (1627-1712) husband of Mary Easty, an accused witch burned at the Salem Witch Trials
- John Easty (1786–1793) a marine in the New South Wales Marine Corps who served in the First Fleet that founded Australia
- Mary Easty (1634-1692) an accused witch burned at the Salem Witch Trials

== See also ==
- Eastie
- Estey
