= Eastie =

Eastie may refer to:

- Eastie, a nickname for East Boston, Boston, Massachusetts, United States
- Eastie, someone from Essex, England, UK; see List of British regional nicknames
- Isaac Eastie (1627-1712) husband of Mary Eastie, an accused witch burned at the Salem Witch Trials
- Mary Eastie (1634-1692) an accused witch burned at the Salem Witch Trials

== See also ==
- Easty
- Estey (disambiguation)
