= Anna Foster =

Anna Foster may refer to:

- Anna Foster (journalist) (born 1979), English journalist, news reporter and presenter
- Anna Foster (broadcaster), BBC Radio Newcastle presenter
- Anna Foster (golfer), Irish golfer

== See also ==
- Ann Foster (c. 1617–1692), Andover widow accused of witchcraft during the Salem witch trials
- Ann Foster (died 1674), English woman who was executed for witchcraft
- Anne Foster, a fictional character from the soap opera Coronation Street
