= Estby =

Estby is a surname. Notable people with the surname include:

- Fred Estby (born 1972), Swedish drummer
- Helga Estby (1860–1942), American suffragist

== See also ==
- Estey (surname)
