= Mary Black (Salem witch trials) =

White accused witch craft

Mary Black (Note: Mary's surname was likely a reference to her race, like Tituba Indian and John Indian.) was an African-American enslaved by Nathaniel Putnam of the Putnam family who was accused of witchcraft during the Salem witch trials. Nathaniel's nephew was Thomas Putnam, one of the primary accusers. However, Nathaniel himself was skeptical and even defended Rebecca Nurse. Mary was arrested, indicted, and imprisoned, but did not go to trial, and was released by proclamation on January 21, 1693 [O.S. January 11, 1692]. She returned to Nathaniel's household after she was released, another indication of Nathaniel's view of the charges against her.

Along with Tituba and Candy, Mary was one of three enslaved people accused during the hysteria. All of them survived.

== Arrest ==
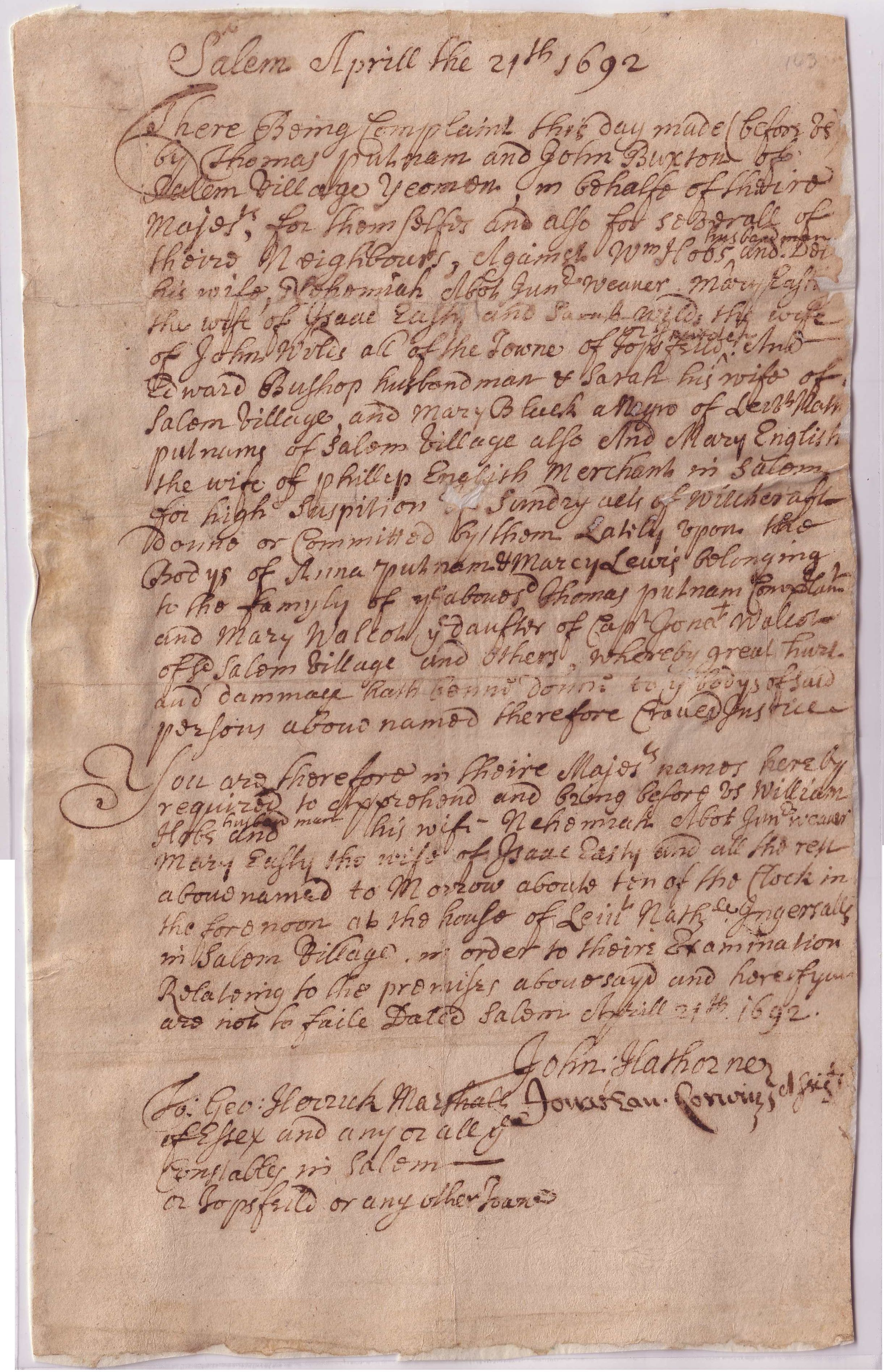
Mary Black Arrest Warrant

John Hathorne and Jonathan Corwin ordered Mary Black, along with Sarah Wildes, Sarah and Edward Bishop, William and Deliverance Hobbs, Nehemiah Abbot, Mary Eastey, and Mary English to be arrested on April 21, 1692, on "high suspicion" of witchcraft performed on Ann Putnam, Jr., Mercy Lewis, Mary Walcott, and others, due to a complaint by Thomas Putnam and John Buxton.

== Examination ==
Her examination, which was recorded by Samuel Parris, was notable for the fact she was asked to re-pin her neckcloth, which seemingly caused the afflicted girls, including Mary Walcott, Abigail Williams, and Mercy Lewis to be pricked, to the point of drawing blood, according to the transcript. Mary maintained her innocence.

== Trial ==
Mary was put on trial in January 1693, and no one appeared against her, so she was released. In his book, Satan and Salem, Benjamin Ray puts forth the "likely" possibility that Nathaniel Putnam was too well respected for anyone to accuse his servant of wrongdoing. He did not accuse her himself, and he paid her jailing fees and took her back into his household. He further theorizes that her steadfast testimony as to her innocence might have been due to Putnam's coaching. Mary's accusers may have been retaliating for Nathaniel having spoken out in defense of Rebecca Nurse. Little else could be gained by accusing an enslaved person, as they did not own property.
