= Candy (Salem witch trials) =

Enslaved woman accused of witchcraft during the Salem witch trials

Candy was an Afro-Barbadian woman enslaved by Margaret Hawkes of Salem Town, who was accused of witchcraft during the Salem witch trials. On July 1, 1692, John Putnam, Jr. and Thomas Putnam accused both Hawkes and Candy of tormenting Ann Putnam, Jr., Mary Walcott, and Mary Warren. The supposed victims stated that they had seen her as 'a ghost' flying around and attacking them.

She was examined before the Justices on July 4, 1692. Upon interrogation, she "admitted" to being a witch but turned on her enslaver, claiming that Hawkes had turned her into a witch and forced her to sign the devil's book. Despite this admission, she was found not guilty and was released. There is no record of Margaret Hawkes having been arrested. Unlike many of the other accused married women, who were referred to as "Goodwife", Margaret was addressed with the honorific "Mrs.", which indicates she was of a higher social class.

When Candy was asked how she and her enslaver tormented the girls, she volunteered to demonstrate the procedure. She returned with some poppets, and when they were manipulated by pinching, heat, and water, the afflicted girls responded in kind.

Her examination records her testimony in broken English, which indicates she was probably newly exposed to the English language.

She was one of three enslaved women, along with Tituba and Mary Black, to be accused during the 1692 mass psychogenic illness in the Province of Massachusetts Bay.
