= Estey Tavern =

- U.S. National Register of Historic Places
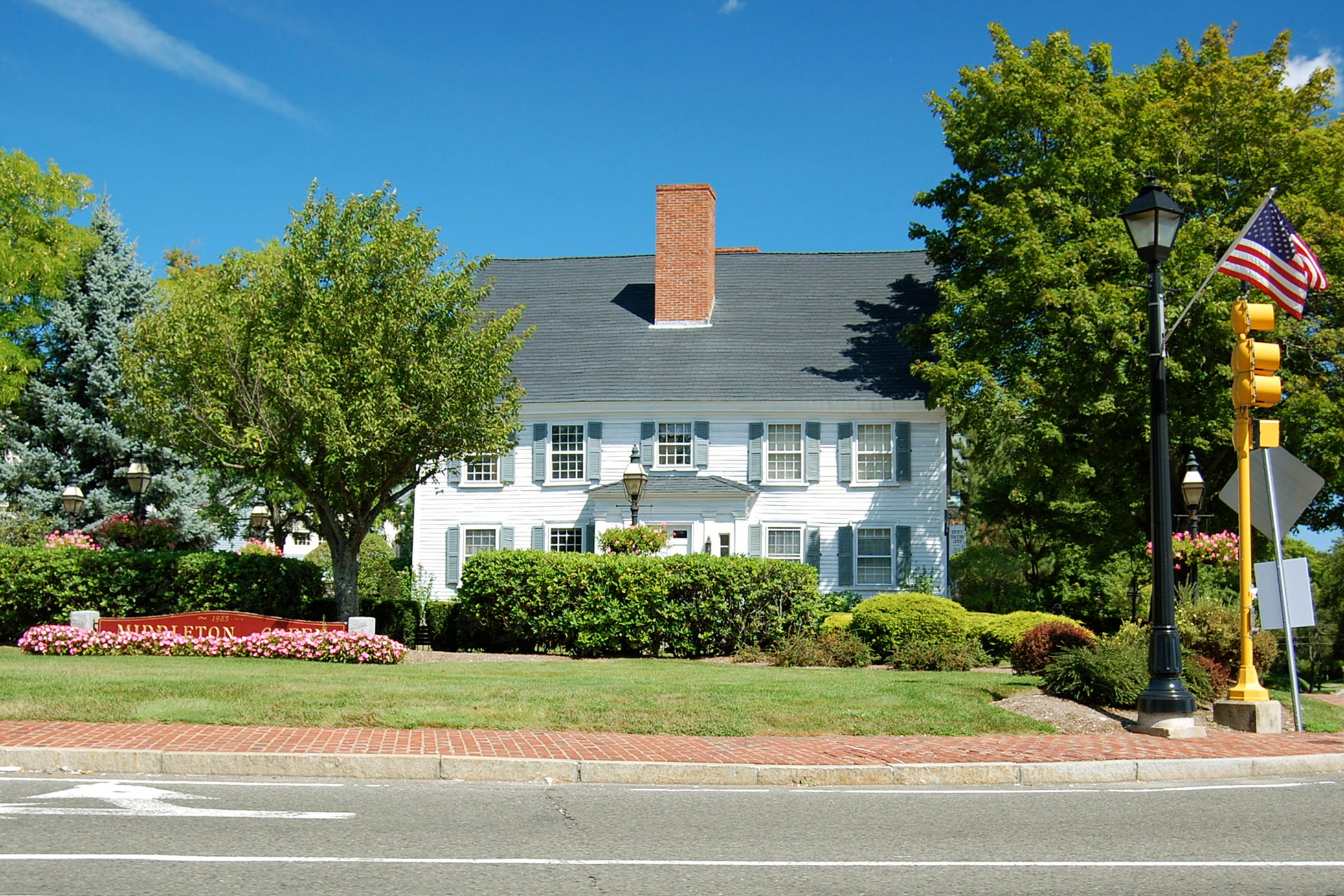
- Estey Tavern

- Location within Massachusetts Location within the United States
- Location: 1 Central Street, Middleton, Massachusetts
- Coordinates: 42°35′43″N 71°0′57″W
- Built: 1753
- Architectural style: Georgian
- NRHP reference No.: 89001587
- Added to NRHP: October 12, 1989

The Estey Tavern is a historic tavern in Middleton, Massachusetts. The 2.5-story wood-frame tavern house was built in 1753 by Samuel Bradford, who operated the tavern until 1763, when it was taken over by John Estey. The building is notable in part because its eastern ell encapsulates elements of a 17th-century building, including a chimney and some beams. The building has been converted to residential use, housing three living units.

The building was listed on the National Register of Historic Places in 1989.

== See also ==
- National Register of Historic Places listings in Essex County, Massachusetts
