= Alice Parker (Salem witch trials) =

Wrongful execution victim

- Died: 22 September 1692; Salem Village, Province of Massachusetts Bay
- Known for: Convicted of witchcraft in the Salem witch trials
- Status: Executed by hanging (22 September 1692; 334 years ago); Exonerated (October 31, 2001)
- Conviction: Witchcraft (posthumously overturned)
- Penalty: Death

Alice Parker, a resident of Salem Town, Massachusetts, was executed on September 22, 1692, during the Salem Witch Trials.

== Trial ==
Martha Corey, Mary Eastey, Ann Pudeator, and Dorcas Hoar were convicted and sentenced to death by hanging at the same time, but Hoar was given a reprieve after confessing. Also hanged on that day were Mary (née Ayer) Parker and Samuel Wardwell. The Rev. Nicholas Noyes officiated. Mary Bradbury, an elderly woman (aged 77) who had been convicted of witchcraft, had also been sentenced to hang, but escaped. The charges against Alice Parker included the murder of Mary Warren's mother.

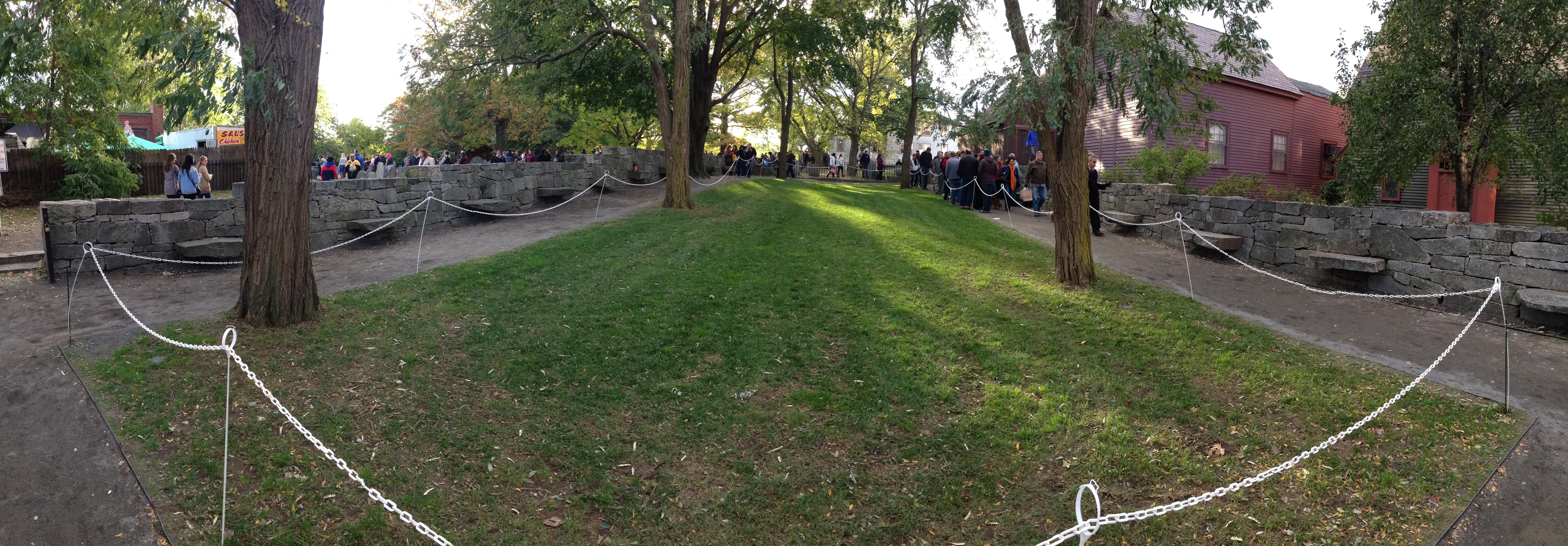
Witch Trials Memorial, Salem, Massachusetts

On May 12, 1692, Alice Parker was charged with a number of additional acts of witchcraft, including casting away Thomas Westgate and bewitching Mary Warren's sister. Margaret Jacobs also said she had seen her in North field in an apparition. Alice denied all accusations, and said she wished the earth could open and swallow her. She also asked for mercy from God.

Some sources note that Alice was the wife of local fisherman John Parker. There were several Parker families in the area which has resulted in some confusion.
