= Rachel Clinton =

Survivor of the Salem witch trials (c. 1629–1695)

Rachel Clinton (née Haffield; c. 1629 – 1694/95), born in Sudbury, Suffolk, England, to Richard and Martha Haffield, was a survivor of the Salem witch trials.

== Early years ==
In the spring of 1635 the Haffield family emigrated to New England and sailed upon a ship named The Planter. Rachel was one of five daughters and her mother had been a maid-servant who was later deemed to be mentally insane. Rachel grew up in an affluent household although the Haffield family fortune was ever dwindling.

In 1639 Rachel's father died and her mother rented out sections of their property to tenants as well as earning an income from spinning (textiles). Her father's will stipulated that his estate be divided evenly among his wife and five daughters. The will triggered years of quarrels and bitterness in the family, particularly in regard to the children of his first marriage. Rachel therefore passed her later childhood years in the absence of an older male in the family as she had no brothers, an atypical situation for the era. The mental condition of her mother continued to deteriorate in the ensuing years and she was declared "non compos mentis" in 1666 by local magistrates.

== Marriage ==
Rachel, at age 36, married Lawrence Clinton, who was some fourteen years her junior. Legal proceedings during this entire period were still underway regarding the estate of her late father, and Rachel became an unfortunate loser. It was never made clear whether she ever received monies from her rightful inheritance, and solicitation was acrimonious to the extent that she descended into destitution, having fallen out of favor with her husband.

In 1671 Rachel accused her husband of not providing her with regular maintenance, and he was sentenced to prison until he "hath paid her 40 shillings for times past". Rachel herself was ordered "to entertain him as her husband when he comes to her". Further legal problems presented themselves when in September 1676 the court convicted Mary Greeley, a maidservant, of "committing fornication with Lawrence Clinton".

Soon after, Rachel petitioned for divorce but was herself imprisoned for pursuing an extramarital affair with a man called John Ford. Both were incarcerated on "suspicion of uncleanliness and other evil practises". The two were bound to maintain 'good behaviour', and the relationship with Ford ended. She renewed her efforts to obtain a divorce from Lawrence Clinton, who married again although not divorced from Rachel, sired children, and continued to come before the courts on minor charges of fraud.

== Allegations ==
From this point on Rachel was forced to beg for money to support herself and it is at this stage in her life that allegations of witchcraft begin to appear. A variety of Ipswich, Massachusetts residents were called to give sworn depositions against her in 1692. Allegations were made by a Mary Fuller that Rachel had caused the death of a neighbor simply by passing her by. Another witness, Thomas Boreman, described an incident in the Ipswich meeting-house where "Some women of worth and quality" had accused Rachel of "hunching them with her elbow". Boreman further alluded that Rachel was able to shape-shift into creatures including a dog and a turtle.

William Baker, a third deponent, attributed the loss of a quantity of beer to Rachel by supernatural means. These are a few examples of dozens of allegations made against Rachel which established her infamy as a practicant of witchcraft. She was alleged to have passed people in the street and yelled "hellhound" and "whoremasterly rogue" at them.

== Last years and death ==
Rachel's vulnerabilities made her a target for predators of the day, including her husband Lawrence, who made use of the Salem Witch Trials to exploit and vilify impoverished women who had fallen through the social classes and from grace when entering the arena of poverty.

Rachel Clinton died destitute in late 1694 or during the first week of January 1695 at Ipswich, Essex County, Massachusetts. Although the date of her death does not appear in formal records, on January 7, 1695, the administration of her estate was granted to a Ruth White of Wenham.
