= William Harding (Virginia witch trials) =

American man convicted of witchcraft in American Colonies

William Harding (born c. 1625, date of death unknown), was the first man to have been convicted of witchcraft in the Colony of Virginia, and also one of the few men to have been tried in a witch trial in Colonial America.

== Background ==
Wright was born around 1625 in England. He emigrated to British America and resided in Northumberland County. where he later was a landowner near Nomini Creek. He was described as a "cunning man" and a troublemaker who caused dissension.

== Witch trial ==
In November 1656, Scottish Reverend David Lindsay of Wicomico Church, Virginia accused William of witchcraft and sorcery, and he was subsequently imprisoned. A 24-member jury was convened, and the witch trial heard testimony from numerous county residents. All records regarding his charges have been lost.

On November 20, 1656, Harding was found guilty of the charges, sentenced to 13 whip lashes, ordered to pay all court costs, and formally banished from the county. Harding's banishment was considered unorthodox as it was not a prescribed punishment in the Witchcraft Act 1603. His case was one of the few male witchcraft trials in the New World.
