= Isaac Eastey =

English-born farmer and barrell maker (1627–1712)

Issac Eastey
- Born: November 27, 1627; Freston, Suffolk, England
- Died: June 11, 1712 (aged 84); Topsfield, Province of Massachusetts Bay, British America
- Occupations: Farmer; barrell maker
- Spouse: Mary Towne (m. 1655; died 1692)
- Children: 11

Isaac Eastey (November 27, 1627 – June 11, 1712) was the English-born farmer and barrell maker who was the husband of Mary Eastey, who was executed during the Salem Witch Trials of 1692 in North America.

Isaac and Mary were both highly respected members of the Salem Village Church, and the community in general. Isaac played a significant role in the witch trials, which is often overlooked in history. Despite being one of the primary reasons for Mary's accusation, he desperately tried to clear his wife's name and put an end to the trials altogether.

== Early life ==
Isaac was born in Freston, Suffolk. He had been a highly prosperous farmer throughout his life, which resulted in a large and upscale home with a generous owning of land and property. Isaac Eastey, along with his brother-in-law Jacob Towne, were lifelong enemies of the Putnam family (who were later the main accusers in the witch trials). The tension between the two powerful families originated with bitter warfare over the ownership of woodland. Isaac and Jacob at one point snuck onto Putnam property and chopped several of their trees down. This, and several other similar incidents, led to a full-on physical confrontation between a band of Putnam men and several Eastey men. However the Putnam clan outnumbered Isaac Eastey and his group, and the Putnams proclaimed a victory. Despite this, the feuding over land ownership between the Easteys and Putnams would last nearly a century. In 1655, Isaac Eastey married Mary Towne. The couple raised eleven children together, with only three of them surviving into adulthood: Isaac Jr. (1656–1714), Joseph (1657–1739), and Sarah (1660–1749).

== His wife's accusation and eventual execution ==
Anne Putnam Jr., Mercy Lewis, and several other young "afflicted" girls in Salem Village viciously accused Mary Eastey of being a witch. The girls claimed Mary's specter would bite and choke them, appear to them at night along with Satan and demand they sign his black book, and (along with her sisters Rebecca Nurse and Sarah Cloyce) would regularly attend satanic ceremonies held in Boston, that Mary was geographically able to participate in due to her ability to fly upon sticks, which the Devil granted her in return for her soul. Residents of Salem Village, Topsfield, and other neighboring towns were shocked to learn a woman of such pious character was accused of being a witch. However, townsfolk were well aware of the bitterness and hostility the Putnams held against Isaac Eastey, and Mary's father, Jacob. This, along with Mary's mother having a long-standing reputation of practicing witchcraft, are what most likely led to her accusation. Isaac, along with his and Mary's friends, family and neighbors, all vigorously tried to defend Mary during her examination and trial, but did not succeed. Isaac's wife Mary was hanged on September 22, 1692.

== Later life ==
Isaac and his family did receive compensation of 20 pounds, from the Massachusetts Bay Colony government, after Mercy Lewis admitted she had wrongfully accused Mary of being a witch in 1711. He died in Topsfield, Massachusetts.
