= Ann Foster (died 1674) =

English woman executed for witchcraft

Ann Foster (died 1674) was an English woman who was executed for witchcraft.

She was a poor old widow. One day, she asked her neighbor Joseph Weeden for alms. When her neighbor refused, she left mumbling curses. After this 30 of Weeden's sheep died, and his house and his barn caught fire. She was accused of having caused this by use of sorcery. She was judged guilty as charged and executed by hanging in Northampton in August 1674.

Her case was the subject of the pamphlet The Full and true relation of the tryal, condemnation, and execution of Ann Foster.
