= Estey (surname) =

Estey is a surname of English origin. Notable people with the surname include:

- Audrée Estey (1910-2002), American founder of the American Repertory Ballet
- Jacob Estey (1814–1890), American founder of Estey Organ
- James Wilfred Estey (1889–1956), Canadian jurist
- John Estey, American politician from Pennsylvania
- Mary Estey (1634–1692), early American puritan hanged in the Salem witch trials
- Willard Estey (1919-2002), Canadian jurist, son of James
