= Roger Toothaker =

Massachusetts colonist accused of witchcraft

- Born: 1634; England
- Died: 16 June 1692 (aged 57); Boston, Province of Massachusetts Bay
- Occupation: Physician
- Criminal charge: Witchcraft

Roger Toothaker (1634 – 16 June 1692) was a physician from Billerica, Massachusetts who was accused of witchcraft during the Salem witch trials in May 1692. He was sent to Boston Jail where he died the following month.

== Background ==
Roger Toothaker was born in England in 1634. In 1635, as an infant, Toothaker traveled to the Massachusetts Bay Colony from London, sailing from 21 August to 11 September on the Hopewell, led by Captain Babb. In 1638, his father, Roger Toothaker, died, possibly in Plymouth on 5 February. Later that year his mother Margaret married Ralph Hill on 21 December and they lived in Billerica. He served as an assistant to Samuel Eldred, and later became a physician although he had no formal medical training. In or around 1662 or 1663, his stepfather died. In 1665 he married Mary Allin, a midwife, and had eight children who survived infancy: Nathaniel, Martha, Allin, Roger, Sarah, Mary, Andrew, and Margaret.

Toothaker, a farmer and folk-healer, claimed to specialize in detecting and punishing witches. For several years before the Salem witch trials began in 1692, Toothaker had reportedly bragged to locals that he had taught his daughter, Martha Emerson, wife of Joseph Emerson, his trade and that she had killed a witch.

== Salem witch trials ==
On 18 May 1692, Elizabeth Hubbard, Ann Putnam Jr., and Mary Walcott accused Toothaker of witchcraft. Elizabeth was the servant of William Griggs, Toothaker's competitor. On 28 May, Mary Toothaker, Margaret Toothaker (aged 9), Martha Carrier, and Elizabeth Jackson were arrested. John Willard of Salem, Thomas Farrar Sr. (or Farrer) of Lynn, and Elizabeth Hart were arrested, along with Toothaker. Toothaker's daughter Martha was also arrested but later released for lack of evidence.

Toothaker was sent to Boston Jail but was never sent to trial. He remained there until his death the following month at age 57. His body was examined and it was confirmed that he died of natural causes, although it is impossible to separate his death from his imprisonment, and likely illness and/or maltreatment and/or malnutrition.
