= Susannah Martin =

Woman executed for witchcraft in Salem, Province of Massachusetts in 1692

- Born: Susannah North; England
- Baptized: September 30, 1621
- Died: July 19, 1692 (aged 71); Salem, Massachusetts Bay Colony
- Cause of death: Hanging
- Spouse: George Martin
- Children: Nine children including a step-daughter
- Parent(s): Richard North and Joan Bartram

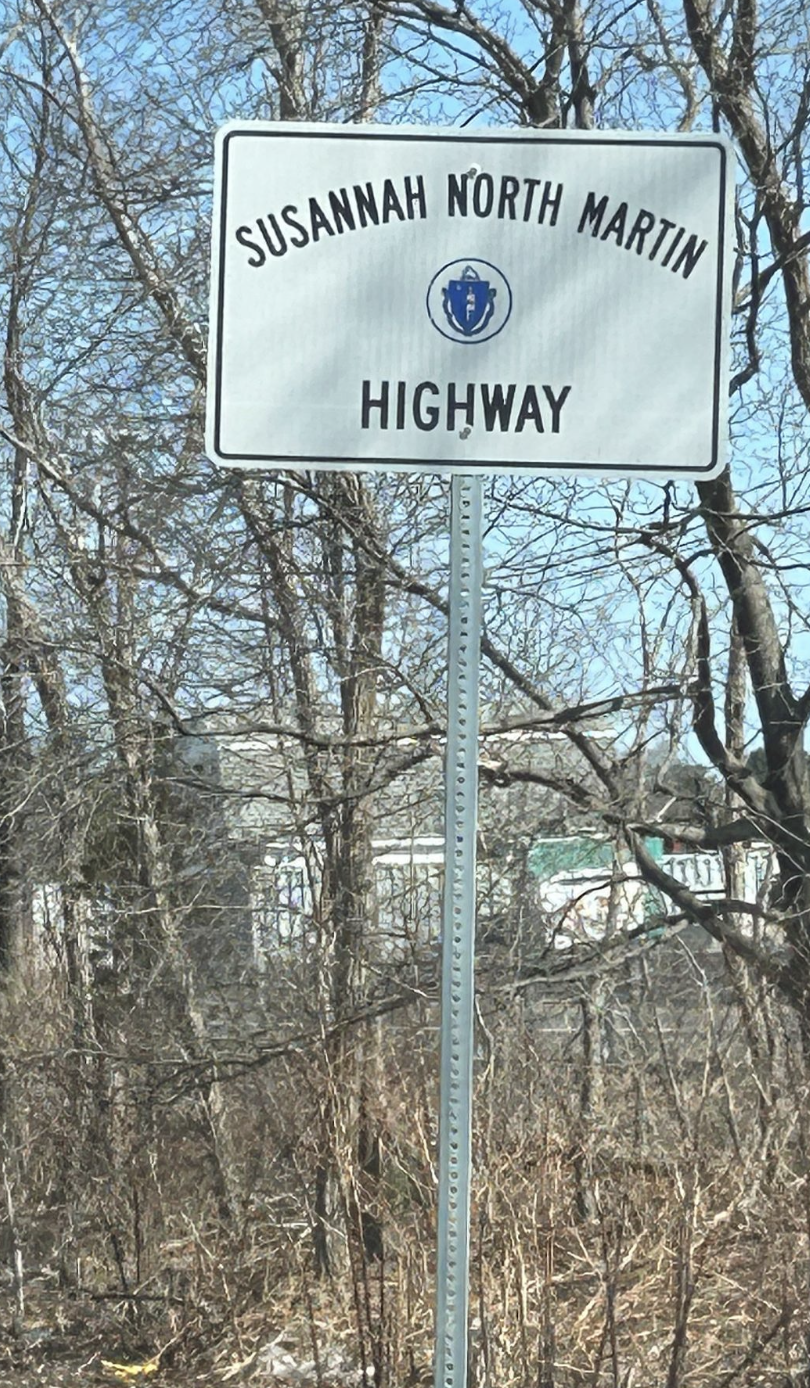

Susannah Martin (née North; baptized September 30, 1621 – July 19, 1692) was one of fourteen women executed for the suspicion of practicing witchcraft during the Salem witch trials of colonial Massachusetts.

== Early life ==
The English-born Martin was the fourth daughter, and youngest child, of Richard North and Joan North (née Bartram). Her mother died when she was a child. Her stepmother was Ursula North. Martin was baptized in Olney, Buckinghamshire, England on 30 September 1621. Her family moved to Salisbury, Massachusetts, around 1639 when she was about 18 years old.

On August 11, 1646, at Salisbury, Susannah married a widower named George Martin, a blacksmith with whom she had eight children.

By 1669, Susannah had been publicly accused of witchcraft. Her husband, George Martin, sued William Sargent, Jr., for slander against Susannah. (Note: Court records indicate two claims against Sargent: one for repeating a story involving Susannah's having, prior to her marriage to Martin, "wrung the neck" of a child she had and threatened a man who happened upon that event in a stable, and another for accusing Susannah of being a witch. (Martin also sued Thomas Sargent, for claiming that one of Susannah's sons was a bastard and another was her "imp," but this claim was withdrawn on or about April 8, 1669.) The case regarding the stable story was resolved in Martin's favor (awarding damages of "a white wampam peague or the eighth part of a penny"), but as for the alleged witchcraft slander, the verdict was for the defendant. The contemporary record notes that the "Court did not concur," presumably with the jury's verdict; see 1669 Records and Files of the Quarterly Courts of Essex County, at page 129.) A higher court later dismissed the witchcraft charges.

By 1671, the Martin family was again involved in legal proceedings dealing with the matter of her inheritance after Ursula North's death, most of which she (Ursula) had left to her granddaughter, Mary Jones Winsley. The court sided against Susannah and George, although Susannah was able to bring five further appeals, each being decided against her.

== Trial and accusation ==
George died in 1686, leaving Susannah an impoverished widow by the time of her second accusation of witchcraft in 1692. Inhabitants of nearby Salem Village, including Joseph and Jarvis Ring, had named Susannah a witch and stated she had attempted to recruit them into witchcraft. She was also accused by John Allen of Salisbury, a man who claimed that she had bewitched his oxen and drove them into the river nearby where they later drowned. She was tried for these charges, during which process she proved by all accounts to be pious and quoted the Bible freely, something a witch was said incapable of doing. Cotton Mather countered Susannah's defense by stating in effect that the Devil's servants were capable of putting on a show of perfect innocence and Godliness.

Susannah Martin was found guilty, and hanged on July 19, 1692, in Salem. Some interesting excerpts from the transcript of Susannah's trial are below: (spelling, punctuation, capitalization as original)

To the Marshall of the County of Essex or his lawful Deputies or to the Constable of Amesbury: You are in their Majesties names hereby required forthwith or as soon as may be to apprehend and bring Susanna Mertin of Amesbury in þ county of Esses Widdow at þ house of Lt. Nathaniel Ingersolls in Salem village in order to her examination Relating to high suspicion of sundry acts of Witchcraft donne or committed by her upon þ bodies of Mary Walcot, Abigail Williams, Ann Putnam, and Mercy Lewis of Salem village or farms whereby great hurt and damage hath been donne to þ bodies of said persons.... etc.

At the preliminary trial for the crime of "Witchcraft and sorcery," Susannah pleaded that she was not guilty. The original court record book has been lost, but the local Puritan minister, Cotton Mather, recorded the testimony. Susannah and the others accused were not allowed to have counsel.

As soon as she came in, Marcy had fits

Magistrate: Do you know this woman?
Abigail Williams saith it is goody Martin, she hath hurt me often.
Others by fits were hindered from speaking.
Marcy Lewis pointed at her and fell into a little fit.
Ann Putnam threw her glove in a fit at her.

................ Susanna laughed ................

Magistrate: What! Do you laugh at it?
Martin: Well I may at such folly.
Mag: Is this folly? The hurt of persons?
Martin: I never hurt man or woman or child.
Marcy: She hath hurt me a great many times and pulls me down.

Then Martin laughed again.

Susannah Martin was twice forced to submit to physical examination in order to find evidence of a "witch's tit or physical protuberance which might give milk to a familiar." No such deformity was found on Susannah Martin, but it was noted that "in the morning her nipples were found to be full as if the milk would come," but by late afternoon, "her breasts were slack, as if milk had already been given to someone or something." This was thought to be an indication that she had been visited by a witch's familiar, and was considered clear evidence of guilt.

== Legacy ==
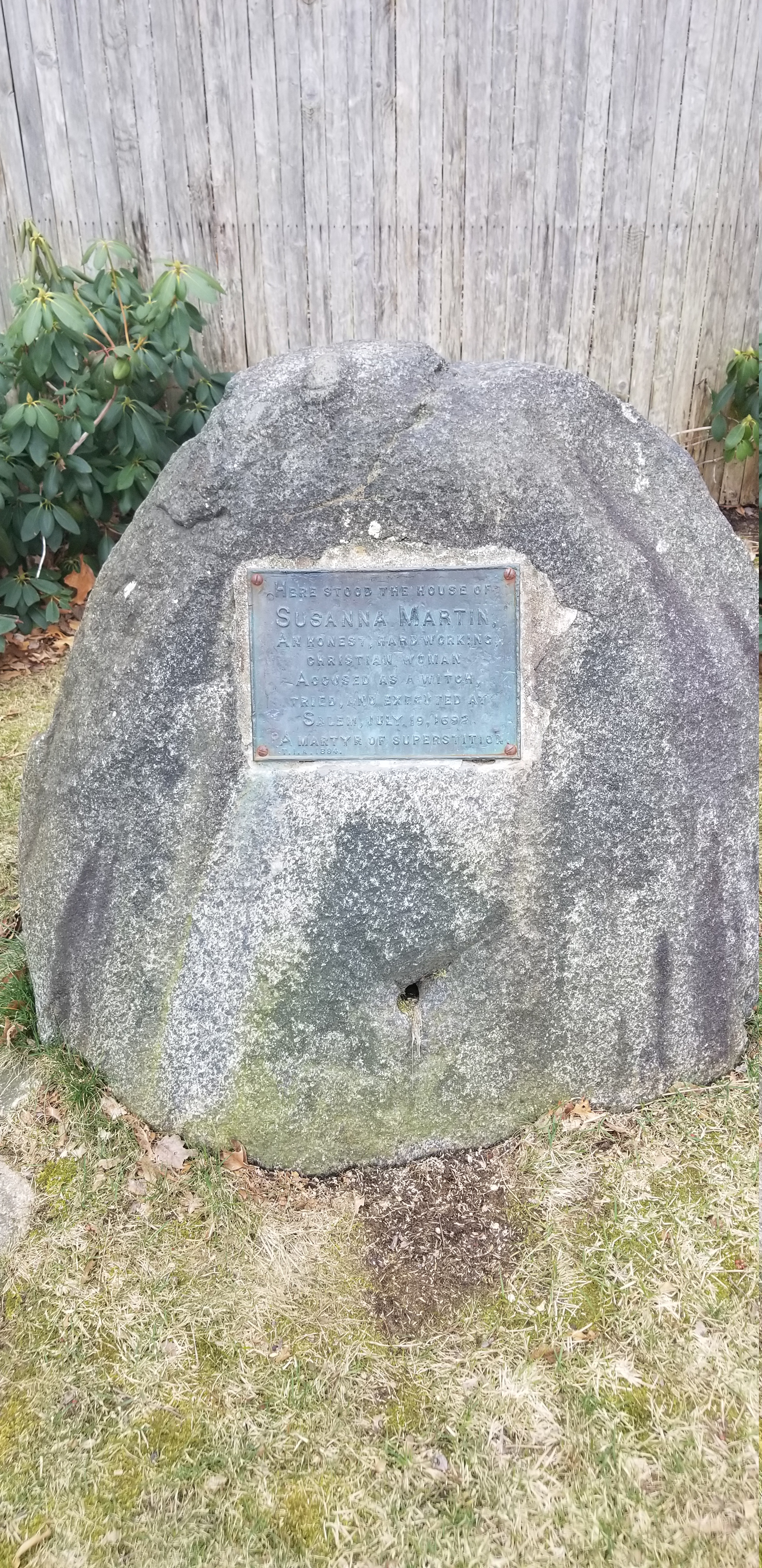
Susannah Martin memorial in Amesbury (plaque close-up)

Lone Tree Hill, a famous historical site, bore a tablet on its westerly side marking the site of George and Susannah's home. The boulder which marked their homestead was moved to make room for a highway. Today it can be found at the end of North Martin Road, in Amesbury. The inscription on the marker reads: "Here stood the house of Susanna [sic] Martin, An honest, hardworking, Christian woman accused as a witch, tried, and executed at Salem, July 19, 1692. A martyr of superstition. T.I.A. 1894."

In the 19th century, poet John Greenleaf Whittier composed "The Witch's Daughter" about Martin:

Let Goody Martin rest in peace, I never knew her harm a fly,
And witch or not - God knows - not I?
I know who swore her life away;
And as God lives, I'd not condemn
An Indian dog on word of them.

On August 29, 1957, the Commonwealth of Massachusetts voted to wipe from the books the convictions of six women that had been unjustly accused of being witches 265 years earlier. Gov. Foster Furcolo signed the legislation that intended to clear Susannah Martin, as well as Ann Pudeator, Bridget Bishop, Alice Parker, Margaret Scott and Wilmot Redd. All had been convicted in a colonial court and hanged during the 17th century.

However, while taking a graduate course on Salem witchcraft during the late 1990s, Paula Keene discovered that, although the legislators intended to pardon all six of the women in 1957, only Ann Pudeater's name was listed on the official documents. Susannah Martin, Bridget Bishop, Alice Parker, Margaret Scott and Wilmot Redd were simply listed as "five others convicted of witchcraft." Keene and state representative Michael Ruane worked together to redress the issue.

On Halloween 2001, due to Keene and Ruane's efforts, as well as the efforts of many of the descendants of the accused witches, Susannah Martin, Bridget Bishop, Alice Parker, Margaret Scott and Wilmot Redd were finally, and truly exonerated by the Commonwealth of Massachusetts. Descendants of Susannah Martin’s, Ethel Mae Hilton and grandchildren Douglas and Madrey Margaret Hilton were some members of their family interested in the history of their accused witch ancestor.

The folk band Touchstone recorded the song "Susanna Martin" for their 1982 album, The New Land on the Green Linnet label.

On September 28, 2022, Governor Charlie Baker signed into law that a stretch of highway along I-495 in Amesbury, MA would be designated the "Susannah North Martin Highway." This followed two years of communication with Senator Diana Di Zoglio and testimony before the joint legislative committees by Roger Kriney, a 9th. great-grandson, and many members of the Susannah North Martin Legacy Facebook Group, Brian Bailey, (11th. G. Grandson), Admin. On March 24, 2023, signs were erected along both northbound and southbound sides of a stretch of Highway 495 in Amesbury, MA.
