= Ann Pudeator =

Woman executed for witchcraft in Salem

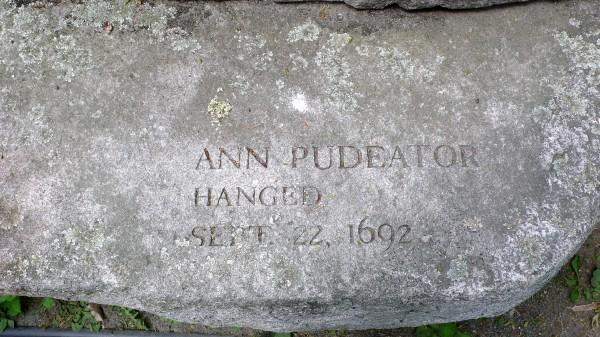
- Ann Pudeator's memorial marker
- Born: November 13, 1621
- Died: October 2 [O.S. September 22], 1692 (aged in her 70s); Salem, Province of Massachusetts Bay
- Occupations: Nurse, midwife, housewife
- Known for: Convicted of witchcraft in the Salem witch trials
- Spouses: Thomas Greenslade (died 1674); Jacob Pudeator (m. 1676–1682)
- Children: 5
- Status: Executed by hanging (1692); Exonerated (1957)
- Conviction: Witchcraft (posthumously overturned)
- Penalty: Death

Ann Pudeator (November 13, 1621 – October 2 [O.S. September 22], 1692) (Note: Contemporary records used the Julian calendar and the Annunciation Style of enumerating months and years. See also: Old Style and New Style dates; Dual dating) was a wealthy septuagenarian widow who was accused of and convicted of witchcraft in the Salem witch trials in colonial Massachusetts. She was executed by hanging.

== Personal life ==
Ann's maiden name is not known, nor the place of her birth. Thomas Greenslade (Note: The name's orthography was unsettled, and it appears as Greenslit, Greenslet, and Greenslade, along with other variations.) was her first husband and they had five children (Thomas Jr., Ruth, John, Samuel, and James).

After Thomas' death in 1674, she was hired by Jacob Pudeator to nurse his alcoholic wife, who died in 1675. Ann then married Jacob in 1676. Jacob died in 1682, leaving Ann well-off.

Some have theorized that Ann Pudeator's likely occupation as a nurse and midwife, along with her being a woman of property, made her vulnerable to charges of witchcraft.

== Witch trials ==
When she was accused of witchcraft, the inventory of Goody Pudeator's alleged misdeeds included:

- Presenting the Devil's Book to a girl and forcing her to sign it
- Bewitchment causing the death of a neighbor's wife
- Appearing in spectral form to afflicted girls
- Having witchcraft materials in her home, which she claimed was grease for making soap
- Torturing with pins
- Causing a man to fall out of a tree
- Killing her own second husband and his first wife
- Turning herself into a bird and flying into her house

Many of these allegations were made by Mary Warren, one of the so-called "afflicted girls". Her other accusers were Ann Putnam Jr., John Best Sr., John Best Jr., and Samuel Pickworth. Ann Pudeator was tried and sentenced to death on September 19 [O.S. September 9], 1692, along with Alice Parker, Dorcas Hoar, Mary Bradbury, and Mary Easty. She was hanged on Gallows Hill in Salem Town on October 2 [O.S. September 22]. It is not known where she is buried, but a memorial stone for her exists at the Salem Witch Trials Memorial in Salem.

Ann's son Thomas testified against George Burroughs at his trial for witchcraft. George Burroughs was executed in August; Thomas testified after Burrough's hanging in a desperate effort to save his mother's life.

In October 1710, the General Court passed an act reversing the convictions of those for whom their families had pleaded, but Ann Pudeator was not among them. Pudeator was exonerated in 1957 by the Massachusetts General Court, partly because of the efforts of Lee Greenslit, a Midwestern textbook publisher who learned about Pudeator's execution while researching his family origins.
