= Giles Corey =

English farmer accused of witchcraft (c. 1611 – 1692)

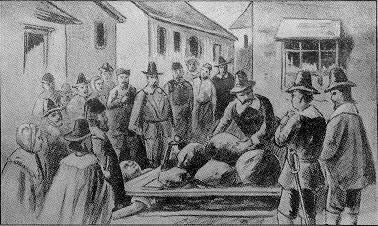
- The pressing of Giles Corey
- Born: c. 1611; Northampton, Northamptonshire, England
- Died: 19 September 1692 (aged 81); Salem, Province of Massachusetts Bay
- Cause of death: Pressed to death
- Occupation: Farmer
- Criminal charges: Witchcraft (rehabilitated); Murder (reduced to unreasonable force and fined)
- Spouses: Margaret (died 1664) Mary Bright (m. 1664; died 1684) Martha Corey (m. 1690)
- Children: 5

Giles Corey (bapt. 16 August 1611 – 19 September 1692) was an English-born farmer who was accused of witchcraft along with his wife Martha Corey during the Salem witch trials in the Province of Massachusetts Bay. After being arrested, Corey refused to enter a guilty or not guilty plea. He was subjected to torture in the form of peine forte et dure, dying after three days of being crushed. Because Corey refused to enter a plea, his estate passed on to his sons instead of being seized by the Massachusetts colonial government.

Corey is believed to have died in the field adjacent to the prison that had held him, in what later became the Howard Street Cemetery in Salem, Massachusetts, which opened in 1801. His exact grave location in the cemetery is unmarked and unknown. There is a memorial plaque to him in the nearby Charter Street Cemetery.

== Early life ==
Giles Corey was born in Northampton, Northamptonshire. He was baptized in the Holy Sepulchre, Northampton on 16 August 1611. Giles was the son of Giles and Elizabeth Corey. His birth is recorded in the parish records. His name is quite often spelled "Corey," but the baptismal record is "Cory."

== Life in Salem ==
It is not certain when he arrived in North America, but there is evidence he was living in Salem Town as early as 1640. He originally lived in Salem Town but later moved to nearby Salem Village (now Danvers) to work as a farmer. There are quite a few entries in the court documents for which he was charged and confessed, mainly petty theft. Charges ranged from sleeping on the watch (and once having his weapon stolen from him while doing so), collecting a canoe load of firewood while on watch, and stealing food, tobacco, knives, and several other small items.

Despite these charges, Corey became a prosperous land-owning farmer in Salem and married three times. He is believed to have married his first wife, Margaret, in England. Margaret was the mother of his eldest four children: Martha, Margaret, Deliverance, and Elizabeth. His second wife was Mary Bright; they were married on 11 April 1664, when Corey was 53 years old, and had a son named John.

In 1676, Corey was brought to trial and charged with murder in Essex County, Massachusetts, for beating to death one of his indentured farm workers, Jacob Goodale (also spelled "Goodell" or "Goodall"), son of Robert and Catherine Goodale and brother to Isaac Goodale. According to witnesses, Corey had severely beaten Goodale with a stick after he was allegedly caught stealing apples from Corey's brother-in-law. Ten days later, Giles went to Zachariah Goodale’s house and told him his brother Jacob had fallen. Giles said he feared Jacob had broken his arm and asked Zachariah to take his brother to Mrs. Mole’s in town. Jacob died a few days later. Giles was only fined for contributing to Jacob’s death. The local coroner, as well as numerous witnesses and eyewitnesses, testified against Corey, including neighbor John Proctor, who testified that he heard Corey admit he had beaten Goodale. Since corporal punishment was permitted against indentured servants, Corey was exempt from the charge of murder and instead was charged with using "unreasonable" force for which he was found guilty and fined.Neighbors suspected Corey may have bribed officials to receive the light sentence.

Corey's neighbor, John Proctor, also accused Corey of the arson of his home. Later, one of Proctor's sons confessed. Corey's second wife, Mary Bright, died in 1684. Corey later married his third wife, Martha Rich in 1690. Some speculate he married Martha so that he would be accepted into the Salem church given his checkered past. Martha was admitted to the church at Salem Village, where Giles had lived. At the time of the witch trials, Corey was 80 years old and living with Martha in the southwest corner of Salem Village, in what is now Peabody.

== Arrest, examination, and refusal to plead ==
Martha Corey was arrested for witchcraft on 19 March 1692. Corey was so swept up by the trials that he initially believed the accusations against his wife until he himself was arrested based on the same charge on 18 April, along with Mary Warren, Abigail Hobbs, and Bridget Bishop. The following day, they were examined by the authorities, during which Hobbs accused Giles of being a wizard. Giles denied the accusations and refused to plead (guilty or not guilty), was imprisoned, and arraigned at the September sitting of the court.

The records of the Court of Oyer and Terminer on 9 September 1692 contain a deposition by one of the people who accused Giles of witchcraft in Mercy Lewis v. Giles Corey:

I saw the apparition of Giles Corey come and afflict me urging me to write in his book, and so he continued most dreadfully to hurt me by times beating me and almost breaking my back till the day of his examination being the 19th April [1692] and then also during the time of his examination he did afflict and torture me most grievously and also several times since urging me vehemently to write in his book and I verily believe in my heart that Giles Corey is a dreadful wizard for since he had been in prison he or his appearance has come and most grievously tormented me.

Again, in this court, Corey refused to plead.

== Death by pressing ==
According to the law at the time, a person who refused to plead could not be tried. To avoid people cheating justice, the legal remedy for refusing to plead was "peine forte et dure". In this process, prisoners were stripped naked, and heavy boards were laid on their bodies. Then rocks or boulders were placed on the boards. This was the process of being pressed:

... remanded to the prison from whence he came and put into a low dark chamber, and there be laid on his back on the bare floor, naked, unless when decency forbids; that there be placed upon his body as great a weight as he could bear, and more, that he hath no sustenance save only on the first day, three morsels of the worst bread, and the second day three draughts of standing water, that should be alternately his daily diet till he died, or, till he answered.

As a result of his refusal to plead, on 17 September, Corey was subjected to the procedure by Sheriff George Corwin, but he was steadfast in that refusal, nor did he cry out in pain as the rocks were placed on the boards. After two days, Corey was asked three times to enter a plea, but each time he replied, "More weight," and the sheriff complied. Occasionally, Corwin would even stand on the stones himself. Robert Calef, who was a witness along with other townsfolk, later said, "In the pressing, Giles Corey's tongue was pressed out of his mouth; the Sheriff, with his cane, forced it in again." There are several accounts of Corey's last words. The most commonly told one is that he repeated his request for "more weight," as this was how it was dramatized in The Crucible, but it may also have been "More rocks". Another telling notes it as, "Damn you. I curse you and Salem!"

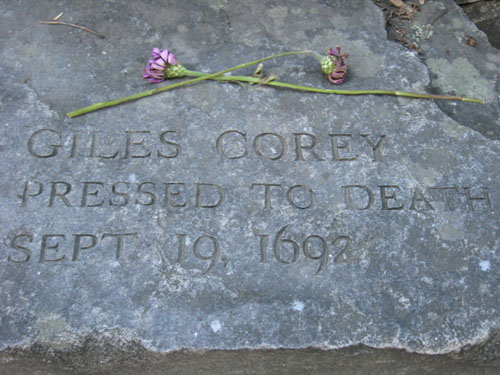
Memorial marker in Salem, Massachusetts

Samuel Sewall's diary states, under the date of Monday, 19 September 1692:

About noon at Salem, Giles Cory was pressed to death for standing mute; much pains was used with him two days, one after another, by the court and Captain Gardner of Nantucket who had been of his acquaintance, but all in vain.

It was and remains unusual for people to refuse to plead and extremely rare to find reports of people who have been able to endure this painful form of death in silence. Since Corey refused to plead, he died in full possession of his estate, which would otherwise have been forfeited to the government. It was passed on to his two sons-in-law in accordance with his will.

== Aftermath ==
Corey's wife, Martha, was hanged three days later on 22 September 1692. She had a son from a previous marriage named Thomas; he showed up as a petitioner for loss and damages resulting from his mother being executed illegally during the witch trials. He was awarded £50 on 29 June 1723.

The gruesome and public nature of Corey's death may have caused residents of Salem to rethink their support for the witch trials. Giles was absolved of the crime in 1712. Martha was not.

Although Corey's refusal to plead meant that his estate was protected from seizure, it was reported that Sheriff Corwin nevertheless extorted his family by falsely claiming that he could still confiscate the property. In 1710, Corey's daughter Elizabeth and her husband John Moulton filed a lawsuit seeking damages from Corwin's estate. Her statement to the court read, "After our father's death, the sheriff threatened to seize our father's estate, and for fear, that we complied with him and paid him eleven pounds six shillings in money."

== Legacy ==
=== Legends ===
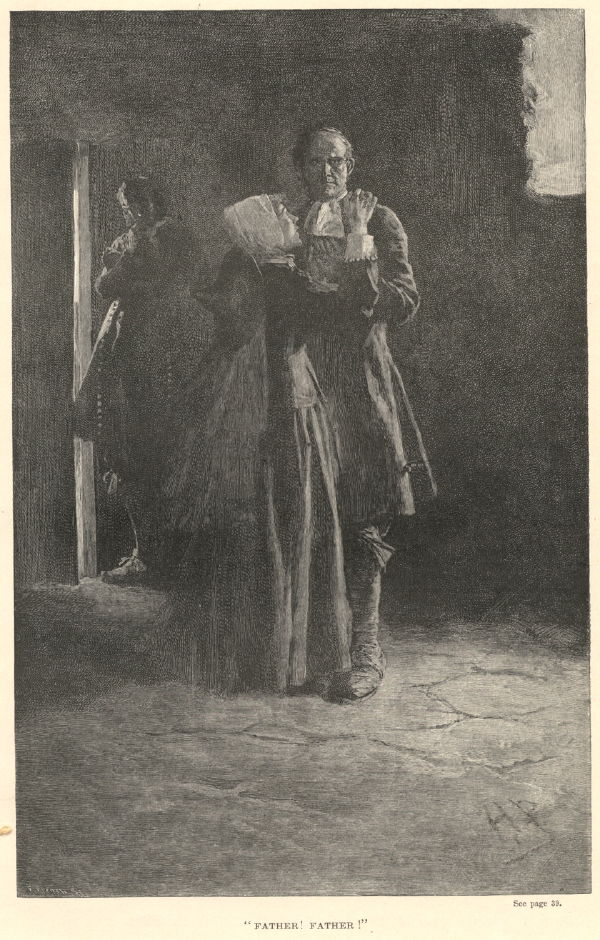
"Father Father", illustration accompanying Giles Cory, Yeoman, a play by Mary E. Wilkins Freeman, Harper's New Monthly Magazine, Volume LXXXVI, 1893

According to a local legend, the apparition of Corey appears and walks through the graveyard each time a disaster is about to strike the city. Notably, he was said to have appeared the night before the Great Salem Fire of 1914. The position of Sheriff of Essex County was also said to have suffered from the "curse of Giles Corey," as the holders of that office, since Corwin, had either died or resigned as a result of heart or blood ailments (Corwin died of a heart attack in 1696). The curse was said to have been broken when the sheriff's office was moved from Salem to Middleton in 1991.

=== Literature ===
Corey is the subject of a Henry Wadsworth Longfellow play entitled Giles Corey of the Salem Farms and an 1893 play, Giles Corey, Yeoman, by Mary Eleanor Wilkins Freeman.

=== Popular culture ===
Corey is a character in Arthur Miller's play The Crucible (1953), in which he is portrayed as a hot-tempered but honorable man who gives evidence critical to the witch trials. His wife, Martha, was one of the 19 people hanged during the hysteria on Proctor's Ledge. In The Crucible, Giles feels guilty about his wife's accusation because he had told a minister that Martha had been reading strange books, which was discouraged in that society. Corey also appears in Robert Ward's operatic treatment of the play, in which his role is assigned to a tenor. A movie of the same name was released in 1996, featuring Peter Vaughan as Corey.

Actor Kevin Tighe portrayed Corey in the pilot episode of the WGN television series Salem, in which he is pressed to death in a more-or-less historically accurate manner.

Metalcore band Unearth wrote a song depicting Corey's death on their album III: In the Eyes of Fire.

Corey is the namesake of one of Dan Barrett's musical projects.
