= Dorcas Hoar =

Widow accused of witchcraft during the Salem witch trials

- Born: Dorcas Galley c.1634 Beverly, Essex County, Province of Massachusetts Bay
- Died: July 12, 1711 (aged 76–77)
- Occupations: fortune teller and accused burglar
- Known for: accused of witchcraft during the Salem witch trials
- Spouse: William Hoar (died)
- Children: 1 son, 2 daughters
- Parents: John Galley (father); Florence Galley (mother)
- Relatives: Actress Jean Smart (direct descendant)

Dorcas Hoar (née Galley; c.1634 – July 12, 1711) was a widow accused of witchcraft during the Salem witch trials of 1692. She was found guilty and condemned to hang, but then confessed and with the support of several ministers, was given a temporary reprieve, after which the trials had already ended.

Born Dorcas Galley in Beverly, Essex County, Province of Massachusetts Bay, daughter of John and Florence Galley, she married William Hoar and was the mother of one son, named for his father, and two daughters. Her sisters were Mary Ross and Elizabeth Giles.

A fortune teller and accused burglar, it appeared inevitable she would be named as a witch. She was ordered arrested on April 30, 1692, by magistrates John Hathorne and Jonathan Corwin, after Jonathan Walcott and Thomas Putnam of Salem Village had made complaints that Hoar, Phillip English of Salem, and Sarah Murrell, also of Beverly, had afflicted Mary Walcott, Mercy Lewis, Abigail Williams, Ann Putnam, Jr., Elizabeth Hubbard, and Susannah Sheldon. Marshal George Herrick delivered Hoar and Murrell to Ingersoll's tavern in Salem Village on May 2, but was unable to locate English, who had fled Salem.

While imprisoned awaiting trial, Hoar confessed to acts of witchcraft to John Lovett, III, son of Bethiah (née Rootes) and John Jr. Lovett. John was visiting his own grandmother, Susannah Rootes, who had also been accused of witchcraft and was awaiting trial. Jonathan testified to this confession at Hoar's trial; she was found guilty.

Rev. Deodat Lawson wrote of her, "only one Woman Condemned, after the Death Warrant was signed, freely Confessed, which occasioned her Reprieval for sometime; and it was observable, This Woman had one Lock of Hair, of a very great length, viz. Four Foot and Seven Inches long, by measure, this Lock was of a different colour from all the rest, (which was short and grey) it grew on the hinder part of her Head, and was matted together like an Elf-Lock; the Court ordered it to be cut off, to which she was very unwilling, and said, she was told if it were cut off, she should Dye, or be Sick, yet the Court ordered it so to be."

Actress Jean Smart was revealed to be a direct descendant of Dorcas Hoar on the sixth episode of the ninth season of the American genealogy documentary series Who Do You Think You Are?
