= Martha Corey =

American woman accused of witchcraft

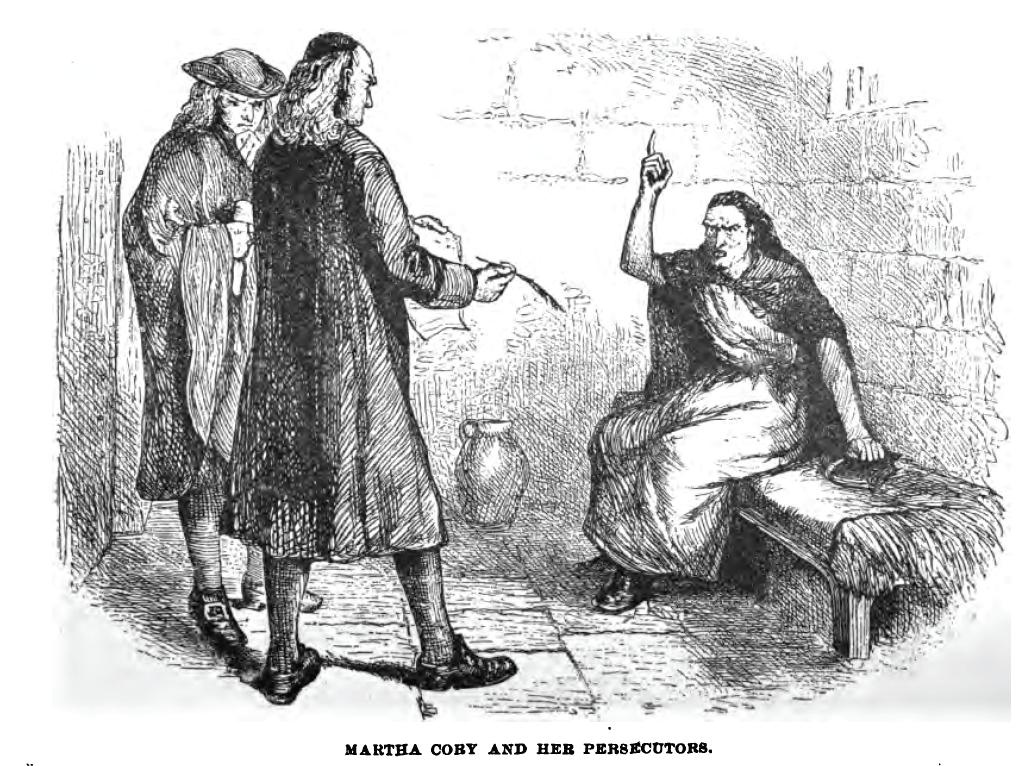
- Drawing of Martha Corey with her persecutors.
- Born: Martha Panon; Unknown (around 1620); New England
- Died: September 22, 1692 (aged around 72); Salem Village, Province of Massachusetts Bay
- Cause of death: Execution by hanging
- Monuments: Salem Witch Trials Memorial (1992), Proctor's Ledge Memorial (2017)
- Occupation: Mother
- Known for: Convicted of witchcraft in the Salem witch trials
- Spouses: Henry Rich (m. 1684, died) Giles Corey (m. 1690; died 1692)
- Children: Benoni Panon, Thomas Rich

Martha Corey (née Panon; died September 22, 1692) was accused and convicted of witchcraft during the Salem witch trials, on September 9, 1692, and was hanged on September 22, 1692. Her second husband, Giles Corey, was also accused and killed.

== Early life and marriages ==
Born Martha Panon, somewhere within New England, her exact date of birth is unknown. At least 20 years before her death, Martha had a mixed race son, Benoni, out of wedlock. Benoni was thought to have an African or Native American biological father and represented, to the Puritans, living proof of Martha's sinful and shameful past.

Martha married Henry Rich in 1684 and had a second son named Thomas Rich. After the death of her first husband, she married wealthy farmer Giles Corey in the year 1690. Benoni lived with Martha and her husband Giles, so town members were aware of him. Giles also had a controversial past including petty theft and a trial for the murder of a servant boy. Both of their pasts may have contributed to their accusations and death in the Salem Witch Trials.

== Salem witch trials ==
Still, Martha had attempted to turn away from her past transgressions. The community was surprised to see Corey accused, as she was known for her piety and dedicated church attendance, and had been officially admitted to the Salem Village Church in 1691. She had never shown support for the witch trials, since she did not believe witches or warlocks existed. She publicly denounced the witch trials as well as the judges who were involved in the various cases. She was outspoken in her belief that the accusers were lying, and upon hearing this, two young girls, Ann Putnam Jr. and Mercy Lewis, promptly accused her of witchcraft.

She was unaware of the level of paranoia in the village, and when she went to trial, she was simply truthful about her innocence and never doubted she would be exonerated. As the girls testified against her during examination, Corey asked the judge not to believe the rantings of hysterical children and continued to make similar claims throughout the Salem trials, so this combination made it easy for the afflicted girls to create a story accusing Corey.

The girls began mimicking her movements as if they were being controlled by her. Mercy Lewis called out, "There's a man he whispered in her ear." John Hathorne asked Lewis if the man was Satan, then shortly Ann Putnam Jr. cried out that Martha Corey had a yellow bird sucking on her hand, which was enough evidence to persuade the jury of her guilt. By accusing her, the Putnam family established their power in the town and showed that they would willingly attack anyone who openly doubted their motives and authority. She was hanged on September 22, 1692. She was 72 years old. This accusation represented a turning point in the Salem Witch Trials as Corey was a respected member of the church who had good economic and social standing within the community. After this, accusations escalated across social boundaries, and over one hundred women were eventually accused of witchcraft.

Her husband, Giles, defended her against the allegations, and in due time he was also accused of witchcraft himself. He refused to undergo a trial and was executed by pressing, a slow crushing death under a pile of stones. The main reason usually cited for his refusal to be tried or to say yea or nay was to keep his estate from being confiscated from his heirs. When the sheriff asked how he would plead, he responded only by asking for more weight. He died on September 19, 1692, three days before his wife Martha was hanged. Since he had not been convicted, his estate passed, in accordance with his last will and testament, to those of his children who had maintained that he was innocent.

== In popular culture ==
In John Neal's 1828 novel Rachel Dyer, Martha Corey is depicted as aloof and lacking the mental capacity to understand her legal predicament during her trial. After protagonist George Burroughs fails to defend her in court, the attention of the accusers turn to him and he is convicted and executed as a result. Martha and Giles Corey are the central characters in Mary Eleanor Wilkins Freeman's play, Giles Corey, Yeoman, where Martha appears as a wronged innocent and Giles does not accuse her (instead the magistrates twist his words to implicate her). They also feature in Henry Wadsworth Longfellow's play Giles Corey of the Salem Farms, where both are portrayed sympathetically as victims of local power struggles. Martha Corey and her husband are both characters in the Arthur Miller play The Crucible (although Martha is only heard off-stage). In the 1957 and 1996 film adaptations of Miller's play, she was depicted (on-screen) by Jeanne Fusier-Gir and Mary Pat Gleason, respectively. Martha Corey is also the titular character in Lyon Phelps's The Gospel Witch.

== Sources ==
- Upham, Charles (1980). Salem Witchcraft. New York: Frederick Ungar Publishing Co., 2 vv., v. 1 p. 190, v. 2 pp. 38–42, 43–55, 111, 324, 458, 507.
