= Mary Eastey =

Woman executed in the Salem witch trials

Mary Esty
- Born: Mary Towne; Great Yarmouth, England
- Baptised: August 24, 1634
- Died: September 22, 1692 (aged 58); Salem Village, Province of Massachusetts Bay
- Occupation: Housewife
- Known for: Convicted of witchcraft in the Salem witch trials
- Criminal charge: Witchcraft (rehabilitated)
- Criminal penalty: Execution by hanging
- Criminal status: Executed
- Spouse: Isaac Eastey (m. 1655)
- Children: Joseph (1657–1739); Sarah (1660–1749); John; Isaac (1662–1714); Hannah; Benjamin (1669–1750); Samuel; Jacob; Joshua; Jeffrey; Mary
- Parents: William Towne (father); Joanna Blessing (mother)
- Relatives: Rebecca Nurse (sister); Sarah Cloyce (sister); Jacob Towne (brother)

Mary Towne Eastey (also spelled Esty, Easty, Estey, or Eastwick) (bap. August 24, 1634 – September 22, 1692) was a defendant in the Salem witch trials in colonial Massachusetts. She was executed by hanging in Salem in 1692.

== Early life ==
Mary Eastey was born Mary Towne to William Towne and Joanna Towne (née Blessing) in Great Yarmouth, Norfolk, England. She was one of eight children, among them her sisters and fellow Salem defendants Rebecca Nurse and Sarah Cloyce. Mary Towne and her family moved to America around 1640. She married Isaac Estey, a farmer and barrel-maker, in 1655 in Topsfield, Massachusetts Bay Colony. Isaac was born in England on November 27, 1627; the couple had eleven children: Joseph (1657–1739), Sarah (1660–1749), John, Isaac (1662–1714), Hannah, Benjamin, Samuel, Jacob, Joshua, Jeffrey and Mary.

== Accusation and trial ==
Text of Mary Eastey's handwritten appeal of sentence

The humble petition of mary Eastick unto [caret added here] his Excellencyes S'r W'm Phipps and to [caret ends] the honour'd Judge and Bench now Sitting in Judicature in Salem and the Reverend ministers humbly sheweth

That whereas your poor and humble petition[er] being condemned to die Doe humbly begg of you to take it into your Judicious and pious considerations that your Poor and humble petitioner knowing my own Innocencye Blised be the Lord for it and seeing plainly the wiles and subtility of my accusers by my Selfe can not but Judge charitably of others that are going the same way of my selfe if the Lord stepps not mightily in i was confined a whole month upon the same account that I am condemned now for and then cleared by the afflicted persons as some of your honours know and in two dayes time I was cryed out upon by them and have been confined and now am condemned to die the Lord above knows my Innocence then and Likewise does now as att the great day will be know to men and Angells — I Petition to your honours not for my own life for I know I must die and my appointed time is sett but the Lord he knowes it is that if it be possible no more Innocent blood may be shed which undoubtidly cannot be Avoyded In the way and course you goe in I question not but your honours does to the uttmost of your Powers in the discovery and detecting of witchcraft and witches and would not be gulty of Innocent blood for the world but by my own Innocency I know you are in this great work if it be his blessed you that no more Innocent blood be shed I would humbly begg of you that your honors would be plesed to examine theis Afflicted Persons strictly and keep them apart some time and Likewise to try some of these confesing wichis I being confident there is severall of them has belyed themselves and others as will appeare if not in this wor[l]d I am sure in the world to come whither I am now agoing and I Question not but youle see and alteration of thes things they my selfe and others having made a League with the Divel we cannot confesse I know and the Lord knowes as will shortly appeare they belye me and so I Question not but they doe others the Lord above who is the Searcher of all hearts knows that as I shall answer att the Tribunall seat that I know not the least thinge of witchcraft therfore I cannot I dare not belye my own soule I beg your honers not to deny this my humble petition from a poor dying Innocent person and I Question not but the Lord will give a blesing to yor endevers.

Like her sister Rebecca Nurse, Eastey was a pious and respected citizen of Salem, and her accusation came as a surprise. During the examination on April 22, 1692, when Eastey clasped her hands together, Mercy Lewis, one of the afflicted, imitated the gesture and claimed to be unable to release her hands until Eastey released her own. Again, when Eastey inclined her head, the afflicted girls accused her of trying to break their necks. Mercy claimed that Eastey's spectre had climbed into her bed and laid her hand upon her breasts. In the face of such public hysteria, Mary Eastey defended herself with remarkable eloquence: when she was asked by the magistrates John Hathorne and Jonathan Corwin how far she had complied with Satan, she replied, "Sir, I never complyed with Satan but prayed against him all my dayes, I have no complyance with Satan, in this ... I will say it, if it is my last time, I am clear of this sin." Hathorne, showing a momentary doubt about her guilt, went so far as to ask the girls if they were quite sure that Mary Eastey was the woman who afflicted them.

For reasons unknown, Eastey was released from prison on May 18 after two months. However, on May 20, Mercy Lewis claimed that Eastey's spectre was afflicting her, a claim which other girls supported. A second warrant was issued that night for Eastey's arrest. She was taken from her bed and returned to the prison; Lewis ceased her fits after Eastey was chained. Eastey was tried and condemned to death on September 9.

Robert Calef, in More Wonders of the Invisible World, described Eastey's parting words to her family "as serious, religious, distinct, and affectionate as could be expressed, drawing tears from the eyes of almost all present". She was hanged on September 22, along with Martha Corey, Ann Pudeator, Alice Parker, Mary Parker, Wilmot Redd, Margaret Scott, and Samuel Wardwell: Cotton Mather, to his later embarrassment, denounced them as "eight firebrands of Hell". On the gallows she prayed for an end to the witch hunt. Of her two sisters, likewise charged with witchcraft, Rebecca Nurse was hanged on July 19, 1692, but Sarah Cloyce was released in January 1693.

Calef also published Mary Eastey's last petition to the Court, of which it has been said that no more moving document has ever been addressed to any judge. Mary pleaded not for her own life but for those of the others falsely accused: "I petition your honours not for my own life for I know I must die and my appointed time is set but the Lord he knows it is that no more innocent blood be shed.....the Lord above that is the searcher of all hearts knows that as I shall answer at the Tribunal seat I never knew the least thing of witchcraft".

In November, after Eastey had been put to death, Mary Herrick gave testimony about Eastey. Herrick testified that she was visited by Eastey's ghost, who told her she had been put to death wrongfully and was innocent of witchcraft, and that she had come to vindicate her cause. Eastey's family was compensated with 20 pounds from the government in 1711 for her wrongful execution.

== In popular culture ==
- Mary Eastey was referred to as a witch in the 2013 horror movie The Conjuring, as was her supposed relative, Bathsheba, who possessed those who lived on her land.
- Mary Eastey was mentioned to be a witch in Season 1 Episode 2 of the TV series Charmed.
- In the 1985 PBS drama Three Sovereigns for Sarah she was played by Kim Hunter.
- In The Crucible, by Arthur Miller, Mary Eastey does not appear on stage, but is named in Act IV, like her sister Rebecca Nurse, as one of those alleged witches whose execution, due to their blameless lives, may cause a backlash against the witchcraft trials. The hero, John Proctor, is pressed hard to name her as a witch, but refuses to do so.
- In 2017, band Primate Fiasco released a song called Mary Towne Estey 1692 on their album Massachusetts Winter.

== Sources ==
- Upham, Charles (1980). Salem Witchcraft. New York: Frederick Ungar Publishing Co., 2 vv., v. 2 pp. 60, 128, 137, 200–205, 324–327, 480.
