= List of people of the Salem witch trials =

This is a list of people associated with the Salem Witch Trials, a series of hearings and prosecutions of people accused of witchcraft in colonial Massachusetts between March 1692 and May 1693. The trials resulted in the executions of twenty people, most of whom were women.

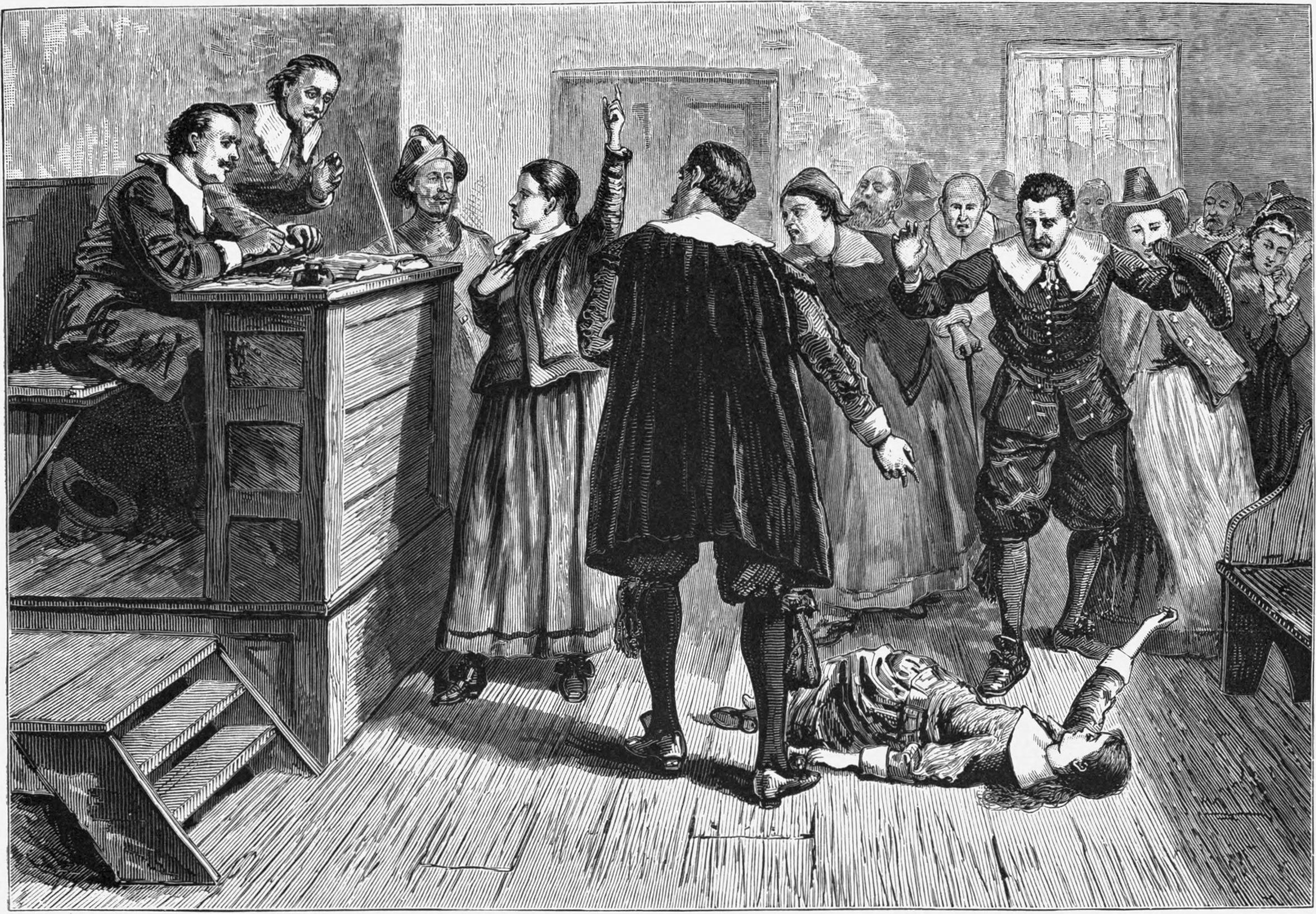
The central figure in this 1876 illustration of the courtroom in the Salem witch trials is usually identified as Mary Walcott, one of the accusers.

Surnames in parentheses preceded by "née" indicate birth family maiden names (if known) of married women, who upon marriage generally took their husbands' surnames. Due to the low population of the Massachusetts North Shore at the time of the trials, a significant percentage of local residents were related to other local residents through descent or by marriage. Many of the witchcraft accusations were driven at least in part by acrimonious relations between the families of the plaintiffs and defendants. Unless otherwise specified, dates provided in this list use Julian-dated month and day but New Style-enumerated year (i.e., years begin on January 1 and end on December 31, in the modern style).

== Accusers ==
=== "Afflicted" ===
- Eleanor Hill-Babson, age about 62 and living in Gloucester
- Joseph Bailey, age 44 and living in Newbury
- Elizabeth Phelps/Phillips-Ballard, age about 46 and living in Andover. She died on July 27, 1667
- Sarah Bibber, age about 36 and living in Salem
- Hannah Chandler-Bixby, aged about 40 and living in Andover.
- Alice Booth, age 14 and living in Salem
- Elizabeth Booth - age 18 and living in Salem
- Elizabeth Wilkins-Booth, age 16 and living in Salem
- George Booth, age 21 and living in Salem
- William Bragg, age 8 and living in Salem
- Mary Fellows-Brown, age about 46 and living in Reading
- Phoebe Chandler, age 12 and living in Andover
- Sarah Churchill/Churchwell, age about 25 and living in Salem Village/Danvers
- John Cole, age about 52 and living in Lynn
- Sarah Coleman, age 22 and living in Rowley
- Mary Daniel, age about 19 and living in Rowley
- John DeRich/Derrick, age 16 and living in Salem
- Joanna Dodd, age unknown and living in Marblehead
- Ralph Farnum/Varnum Sr., age about 59 and living in Andover. He died on January 8, 1693.
- Mary Stevens-Coit-Fitch, age unknown and living in Gloucester. She died on November 7, 1692.
- Hannah Eames/Ames-Foster, age 31 and living in Andover
- Rose Foster, age 13 and living in Andover. She died on February 25, 1693.
- Mary Fuller Jr., age 17 and living in Ipswich
- Goodwife Goodale/Goodall, Referred to as an "ancient woman" and living in Salem Village/Danvers
- Mary Herrick, age 15 and living in Wenham
- Betty Hews/Hughes, age 22 and living in Salem
- Mary Hill, age 25 and living in Salem
- Deliverance Hobbs, age about 50 and living in Topsfield
- Elizabeth Hubbard – age 17 and living in Salem Village/Danvers. Niece of Dr William Griggs, local physician.
- Jane Phillips-Hutchinson, age about 24 and living in Salem Village/Danvers
- John Indian – slave of Rev. Samuel Parris and husband of Tituba. Age unknown and living in Salem Village/Danvers
- Mercy Lewis – age about 17 and living in Salem Village/Danvers. Servant of Thomas Putnam; a former servant of George Burroughs.
- Mary Swain/Swayne-Clark-Marshall, age about 49 and living in Reading
- Abigail Martin, age 16 and living in Andover
- Elizabeth "Betty" Parris – age 9 and living in Salem Village/Danvers. Daughter of the Rev. Samuel Parris.
- Sarah Phelps, age 10 and living in Andover
- Mary Pickworth, age 17 and living in Salem
- Bethshua/Bethsheba Folger-Pope, Age 40 and living in Salem Village/Danvers
- Ann Carr Putnam (Ann Putnam Sr.), age 31 and living in Salem Village/Danvers
- Ann Putnam Jr. – age 12 and living in Salem Village/Danvers. Daughter of Thomas Putnam and Ann Putnam Sr.
- Jemima Rea, age 12 and living in Salem Village/Danvers
- Mary Gould-Reddington, age 71 and living in Topsfield
- Joseph Ring, age 28 and living in Salisbury
- Mary Duncan-Sargent, age 33 and living in Gloucester
- Susannah Sheldon, age 18 and living in Salem
- Mercy Short, age 17 and living in Boston
- Martha Sprague, age 16 and living in Andover
- Timothy Swan, age 29 and living in Andover. He died on February 2, 1693.
- Mary Thorne, age about 14 and living in Ipswich
- Mary Walcott, age 17 and living in Salem Village/Danvers
- Mary Warren – age about 20 and living in Salem. Servant of Elizabeth and John Proctor.
- Mary Watkins, age unknown and living in Milton
- Elizabeth Weston, age about 29 and living in Reading
- Bray Wilkins, age 81 and living in Salem Village/Danvers
- Daniel Wilkins, age 17 and living in Salem Village/Danvers. He died on May 16, 1692.
- Rebecca Wilkins, age 19 and living in Salem Village/Danvers
- Samuel Wilkins, age about 36 and living in Salem Village/Danvers
- Abigail Williams – age 11 and living in Salem Village/Danvers. Cousin of Betty Parris.
- Elizabeth Woodwell, age 33 and living in Salem
- Frances Wycomb, age 17 and living in Rowley

=== Other accusers (including accused witches who "confessed") ===
- Benjamin Abbot
- Deliverance Dane (née Hazeltine)
- Abigail Hobbs
- Samuel Preston Jr.
- Samuel Preston Sr.

=== Physician who diagnosed "bewitchment" ===
- William Griggs – relative and employer of Elizabeth Hubbard

== Executed by hanging ==
- Bridget Bishop - Died June 10, 1692 (aged 60), execution by hanging.
- Sarah Good - Died July 19, 1692 (aged 39), execution by hanging.
- Rebecca Nurse - Died July 19, 1692 (aged 71), execution by hanging.
- Elizabeth Howe - Died July 19, 1692 (aged 57), execution by hanging.
- Susannah Martin - Died July 19, 1692 (aged 71), execution by hanging.
- Sarah Wildes - Died July 19, 1692 (aged 65), execution by hanging.
- Rev. George Burroughs - Died August 19, 1692 (aged 42), execution by hanging.
- George Jacobs Sr. - Died August 19, 1692 (aged 83), execution by hanging.
- Martha Carrier - Died August 19, 1692 (aged 49), execution by hanging.
- John Proctor - Died August 19, 1692 (aged 59), execution by hanging.
- John Willard - Died August 19, 1692 (aged 35), execution by hanging.
- Martha Corey - Died September 22, 1692 (aged 72), execution by hanging.
- Mary Eastey - Died September 22, 1692 (aged 58), execution by hanging.
- Mary Parker - Died September 22, 1692 (aged 55), execution by hanging.
- Alice Parker - Died September 22, 1692, execution by hanging.
- Ann Pudeator - Died September 22, 1692 (aged 70), execution by hanging.
- Wilmot Redd - Died September 22, 1692, execution by hanging.
- Margaret Scott - Died September 22, 1692 (aged 77), execution by hanging.
- Samuel Wardwell Sr. - Died September 22, 1692 (aged 49), execution by hanging.

== Died from peine forte et dure ==
- Giles Corey - Died September 19, 1692 (aged 81), pressed to death after he refused to enter a plea.

== Died in prison ==
- Ann Foster – Along with her daughter, Mary Foster-Lacey Jr., and granddaughter, Mary Lacey Jr., she was arrested on charges of witchcraft in July 1692. She was tortured and confessed after her own daughter provided evidence against her. In a bid to save her daughter and granddaughter, Ann took the blame on herself. She and her daughter were found guilty on September 22, 1692 and sentenced to hang. She was not immediately executed and instead, died in prison on December 3, 1692.
- Sarah Osborne – Died May 10, 1692, aged 49.
- Lydia Dustin – Died March 10, 1693, after 11 months imprisonment, having been acquitted but, unable to pay her court fees. She is the mother of Sarah Dustin and Mary Coleson, both also arrested; a granddaughter, Elizabeth Coleson, was also issued a warrant but fled to prevent her arrest.
- Roger Toothaker – A doctor who died in Boston Jail on June 16, 1692 after being charged with witchcraft. He was known to be a practitioner of a form of folk medicine and interestingly, also claimed to be specialized in detecting and punishing witches. He referred to himself as a witch hunter and bragged to locals that he had taught his daughter, who then killed a witch. His wife, Mary Allen Toothaker and two daughters, Margaret Toothaker and Martha Toothaker Emerson, would also be arrested.
- Mercy Good – Died before her mother, Sarah Good, was executed on July 19, 1692. Mercy was born in prison after her mother's arrest on February 25, 1692.
- Rebecca Addington Chamberlain (circa 1625-1692) – While no court records exist regarding her arrest warrant, it is the general consensus of historians that she was arrested on suspicion of witchcraft. She died at roughly age 67 on September 26, 1692, while still in prison.
- John Durrant - While no court records exist regarding his arrest, John was known to live in Billerica during the trial period and had multiple family members who were accused of witchcraft and arrested. His wife's stepdaughter's husband, Samuel Cardwell Sr., was hanged on September 22, 1692 for witchcraft. Being these connections, it is the general consensus that he was also imprisoned on this charge. He died in Cambridge Prison on October 27, 1692.
- Infant Scargen - Little information exists as to why his/her mother, Elizabeth Scargen, was imprisoned on charges of witchcraft but, she did spend a 6 month period in jail. During this time, she gave birth to an infant who soon died, prior to her release.
- As many as up to 13 additional people are considered to also likely have died in prison while there on charges or witchcraft.

== Survived trial period ==
=== Sentenced but not executed ===
- Elizabeth Proctor (née Bassett), initially avoided execution due to pregnancy. Second execution avoided by general reprieve.
- Mary Osgood, age 55 and living in Andover.

=== Fled to avoid imprisonment ===
- Daniel Andrew (1643-1702), from Salem Village; accused of witchcraft but fled before he could be brought in.
- Philip and Mary English fled to New York; returned to Salem after the conclusion of the trials.
- Mary Bradbury fled Massachusetts until after the witch hysteria had died down; later acquitted, she died of natural causes in her own bed in 1700, aged 85.

=== Released on bond ===
- Dorothy Good, the daughter of Sarah Good
- Sarah Morey, daughter of Peter and Mary Morey

=== Acquitted ===
- John Alden Jr.
- William Barker, Sr.
- Mary Bradbury
- Sarah (Aslett) Cole, age 34 and living in Lynn
- Sarah Dustin, the daughter of Lydia Dustin, who died in prison. Sarah Dustin was found not guilty in January 1693 and eventually released.
- Ephraim Stevens

=== Pardoned ===
- Abigail Faulkner Sr. (née Dane); she was pregnant
- Dorcas Hoar – "confessed"
- Edward and Martha (Browne) Farrington
- Sarah Pease, arrested for witchcraft on May 23, 1692; pardoned by the Governor in May 1693 along with 50 others.

=== Pleaded guilty and pardoned ===
- Tituba, a slave from Barbados working for Rev Samuel Parris

== Not tried ==
=== Born in prison ===
- Mercy, daughter of Sarah Good; born and died in prison sometime before her mother's execution.
- John, son of Elizabeth Proctor and John Proctor

=== Released from prison after the Governor ended the witch trials ===
- Mary Black – slave who was arrested and indicted but never went to trial
- Esther Elwell – ancestor of Sarah Jessica Parker; proved in an episode of Who Do You Think You Are
- Margaret Prince - arrested and indicted Sep 5, 1692; released on bail Dec 15, 1692 after signing the Ipswich Jail Petition; never went to trial
- Mehitable Braebrook Downing; arrested with step-mother Joan Braebrook (wife of Richard Braebrook) in 1692, signed petition for release, release was secured before going to trial due to witchcraft trials coming to an end.

=== Indicted by grand jury ===
- Elizabeth Hutchinson Hart, released after 7 months in jail after her son Thomas filed petitions on her behalf

=== Not indicted ===
- Israel Porter, signed petition protesting the arrest of Rebecca Nurse
- Sarah Cloyce (née Towne), sister of Rebecca Nurse and Mary Eastey
- Thomas Farrer Sr. (or Farrar), spent 7 months in Boston jail before being released
- Tituba, a slave from Barbados working for Rev Samuel Parris

=== Named, but no arrest warrant issued ===
- Sarah Hale (née Noyes), wife of Rev. John Hale, minister in Beverly, Massachusetts
- James Howe II, husband of Elizabeth Howe
- Lady Mary Phips (née Spencer), wife of Massachusetts Governor Sir William Phips
- Margaret Sheaf Thacher (née Webb), mother-in-law of Jonathan Corwin

== Court personnel ==
=== Magistrates ===
==== Court of Oyer and Terminer, 1692 ====
- William Stoughton, Chief Magistrate
- Adam Callow
- John Richards
- Nathaniel Saltonstall (resigned from the court over the nature of the proceedings)
- Waitstill Winthrop
- Bartholomew Gedney
- Samuel Sewall
- John Hathorne
- Jonathan Corwin
- Peter Sergeant

=== Justices ===
==== Superior Court of Judicature, 1693 ====
- William Stoughton, Chief Justice
- Thomas Danforth
- John Richards
- Waitstill Winthrop
- Samuel Sewall

== Public figures ==
- Sir William Phips – Governor of Massachusetts
- William Bond – Speaker of the General Court, ceded authority
- Thomas Brattle
- Robert Calef
- Major Robert Pike

=== Clergy ===
- John Hale, of Beverly, Massachusetts
- Cotton Mather, of Boston, Massachusetts
- Increase Mather, of Boston, Massachusetts
- Nicholas Noyes, of Salem
- Samuel Parris, of Salem Village – Father of Betty Parris and uncle of Abigail Williams
- Samuel Willard, of Groton, and Boston (both Massachusetts)
- Thomas Barnard, of Andover, Massachusetts
- She was age 55
