= Martha Carrier (Salem witch trials) =

Puritan accused in the Salem witch trials

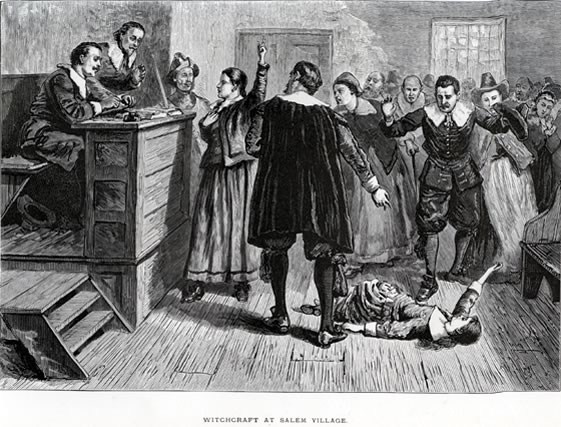
- An 1876 illustration of the courtroom where Martha was convicted of witchcraft.
- Born: Martha Allen (or Allin); 1650; Andover, Massachusetts
- Died: 19 August 1692 (aged 42–49); Salem Village, Province of Massachusetts Bay
- Cause of death: Execution by hanging
- Monuments: The Twenty benches
- Occupation: Housewife
- Known for: Convicted of witchcraft in the Salem witch trials
- Spouse: Thomas Morgan Carrier
- Children: 8

Martha Carrier (née Allen; about 1650 – 19 August 1692) was a Puritan accused and convicted of being a witch during the 1692 Salem witch trials.

== Early life ==
Martha Allen was born about 1650 to Andrew Allen (or Allin) (1623–1690), one of the original 23 settlers of Andover, and Faith Ingalls (1623–1690) in Andover. She had three sisters, Mary (1644–1695), Sarah (1646–1716), and Hannah (1652–1698), and two brothers, Andrew (1657–1690) and John (1661–1690).

On 7 May 1674 when she was 7 months pregnant with her eldest child, she married Thomas Carrier (c. 1650–1739). After the marriage, they relocated to neighboring Billerica, some ten miles southwest of Andover, and lived in the north part of town near her sister Mary. [Note: According to the New England Historic Genealogical Society, Martha's spouse was born Thomas Morgan in Wales. Furthermore, he died in Colchester, Connecticut in 1735, not in 1739 as shown in two places above. According to Carrier family lore, Thomas was born in 1626, not in 1636 nor in 1650, as shown above. The Carrier family believes that Thomas was 108 to 109 years old when he died, while walking home with a sack of grain over his shoulder. The significance of the birth year is that Thomas is believed to have been involved in the execution of King Charles I in 1649. The earlier birth year of 1626 would have made him 23 at the time of the execution; and, hence, he was a plausible participant. Whereas, the later birth years of 1636 or 1650 would have made it impossible. Some sources say he came to New England in 1674 and married Martha at that time; one source says this actually occurred in 1664. In either case, Thomas's arrival in New England would have been after the 1660 Restoration of Charles II, and suggests that Thomas was a regicide on the run, like others such as John Dixwell, Edward Whalley, and William Goffe. Tellingly, he changed his name to Thomas Carrier at that time. Thomas is believed to be the progenitor of virtually all of the Carriers in the United States, even though that was not his real name. Willis Carrier, of air conditioning fame, is descended from Thomas and Martha.] Martha had eight children, one of whom died in infancy:

- Unknown Carrier (d. 1690)
- Richard Carrier (1674–1749)
- Unknown Carrier (1675–1690)
- Andrew Carrier (1677–1749)
- Jane Carrier (1680–1680)
- Thomas Carrier Jr (1682–1739)
- Sarah Carrier (1684–1772)
- Hannah Carrier (1689–1772)

They returned to Andover in 1688 where they lived in poverty and were dependent on the family farm to supply them with a living. Martha nursed her father and two brothers when an outbreak of smallpox spread through the city in 1690 but could not save them. Thereby she became a land owner in her own right. Her husband and four of her children also contracted the disease. Her husband and two of the children survived. They were accused of bringing the disease to the city, but investigation has revealed that the disease was most likely brought by new immigrants from England. Thirteen people perished during the epidemic, and the Carriers were barred from entering public places.

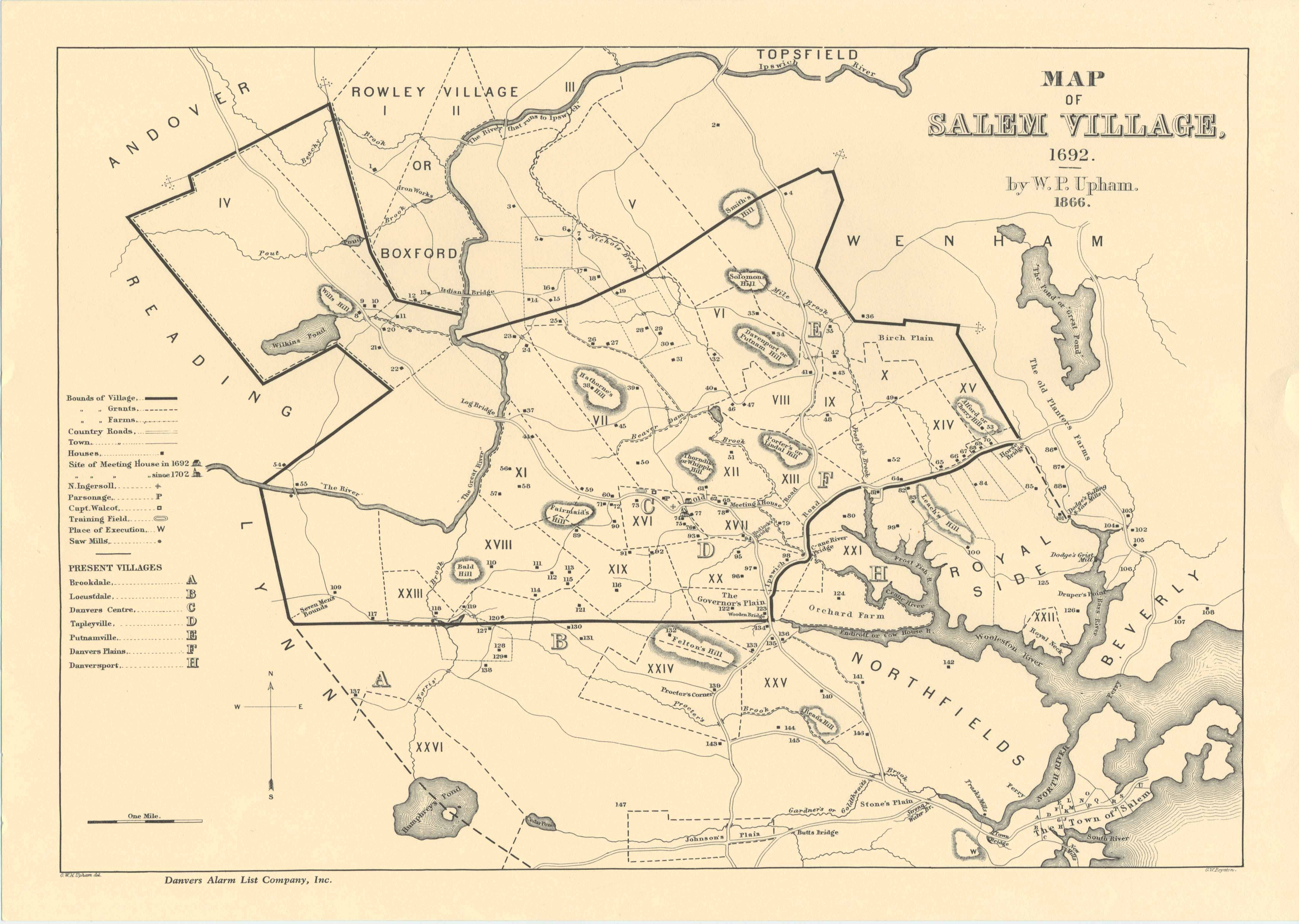
A map of Salem Village (1692)

== The Salem witch trials ==
=== Accusations and arrest ===
Martha was accused of witchcraft in May 1692 by a group of young women known as the Salem Girls who consisted of Susannah Sheldon, Mary Walcott, Elizabeth Hubbard and Ann Putnam Jr, who would travel through Essex County, Massachusetts identifying suspected witches by engaging in a theatrical display. The girls accused her of leading a 300 strong witch army, using her occult powers to murder and afflict people with terrible diseases and of being promised the dubious position of "Queen of Hell". Martha vehemently denied these charges and in turn charged her accusers with insanity.

A warrant was signed for Martha's arrest and she was arrested on 28 May 1692 along with her sister Mary and brother-in-law Roger Toothaker, and their daughter Margaret Toothaker (born 1683). Martha's young children were sent to prison with her, apparently in hopes that their confinement would cause her to confess. The first accused "witch" in Andover, Martha was accused of witchcraft by her neighbor Benjamin Abbot after he fell sick and blamed his illness on her bewitching him after they had gotten into an argument that involved a land dispute. She was taken to jail and placed in chains to keep her spirit from roaming. Three days later, Martha underwent the examination that always preceded the witchcraft trials, but she maintained her innocence.

=== Trial and conviction ===
Martha's trial started on 31 May 1692 and she was transported to the Salem Village Meeting House to face the accusing girls, overviewed by judges John Hathorne, Jonathan Corwin, and Bartholomew Gedney. When Martha entered the room, the girls fell to the floor, writhing with cries of agony.

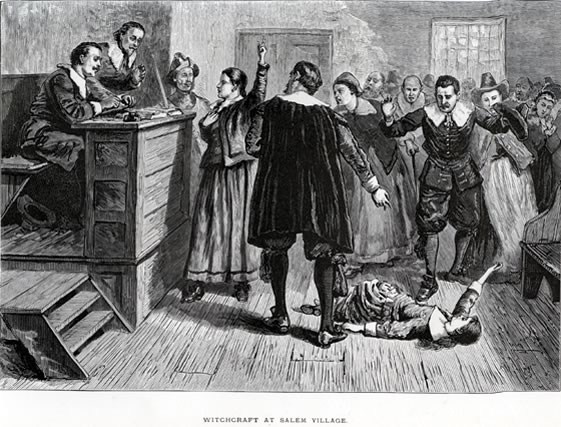
The Salem Village Meeting House served as the courtroom during the trial.

Neighbors were summoned to air their grievances. One local witness complained that Martha's craft caused him to lose a fistfight to her son Richard. Several other women who were accused confessed that Martha had led them to practice witchcraft. Ann Foster said she rode on a stick with Martha to Salem Village, her nephew Allen Toothaker testified that he lost two of his livestock, attributing their deaths to Martha. Samuel Preston blamed the death of one of his cows on Martha claiming that after a disagreement she had placed a hex on the animal. Other Andover citizens used her as a scapegoat for their supposed witchcraft and she soon became the principal name mentioned whenever a new person was accused.

On June 28, 1692, a summons for witnesses against Martha included Samuel Preston Jr, Phoebe Chandler and John Rogers. Phoebe Chandler (born 1681) testified by claiming: I was struck deaf, and could hear no prayer, nor singing, till the last two or three words of the singing" during a Sabbath Day meeting. During the trial, the Salem Girls screamed before the court that they could see the ghosts of the thirteen Andover smallpox victims.

It is false and a shame for you to mind what these say, that are out of their wits!

—Martha Carrier's response to the accusations of the Salem Girls during her trial, 19 August 1692.

Her trial was also fully transcribed at the direction of Cotton Mather, who believed this case to represent the strongest case for the use of spectral evidence. The evidence he found persuasive was the testimony of Martha's 18-year-old son, Richard, and her 7 year-old daughter, Sarah, that she made them become witches to haunt others at her direction. However, John Proctor wrote governor William Phips that he witnessed these children's torture in the jail where he was also imprisoned. The children were reportedly hung by their heels "until the blood was ready to come out of their noses" or until they said what their interrogators wanted to hear.

Throughout the trial Carrier remained defiant and stubborn. She did not confess while many others around her did so she might save her life. There is a possibility that she simply did not expect the outcome of the trials would lead to her execution, as she was one of the first Andover citizens accused and clearly believed the proceedings were a ridiculous invention of a group of adolescents. Others, seeing the punishment meted, quickly confessed to outrageously trumped up charges, often naming Martha as a principal ringleader in return for clemency. She accused the court of complicity in her plotting.

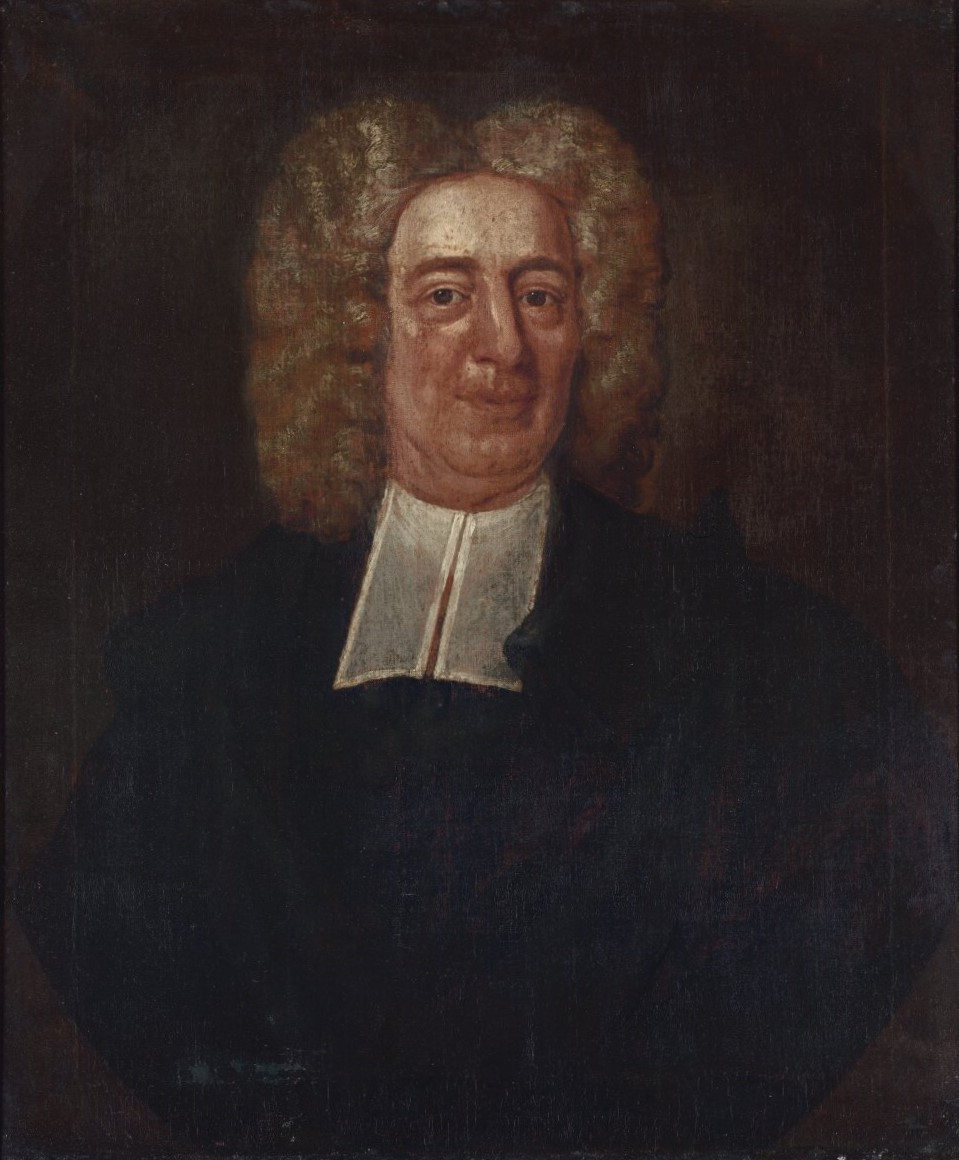
Reverend Cotton Mather (1663–1728) was a key figure during the trial and called Martha Carrier "a rampant hag".

In refusing to submit to the unanimous wishes of the judges, ministers and politicians who gave the hysteria legitimacy, she stood up to oppressive authority figures wielding not only physical power, but spiritual authority and she spoke her mind. Her actions against the court did not save her as she, another woman and four other men were found guilty by the court for witchcraft and sentenced to death by hanging on 5 August 1692.

== Execution ==
On 19 August 1692, Martha was taken in the back of a cart to Gallows Hill in Salem. Cheering crowds lined the streets and gathered at the scaffold to witness the hanging of Martha and the four men who were also convicted of witchcraft. She never gave up as even from the scaffold, her voice was heard asserting her innocence refusing to confess to "a falsehood so filthy". Her body was dragged to a common grave between the rocks about two feet deep where she joined the bodies of George Burroughs and John Willard.

=== Aftermath ===
In 1711, her family received a small amount of recompense from the Massachusetts government for her conviction: 7 pounds and 6 shillings. The Massachusetts government apologized to Thomas Carrier for the hanging of his wife and reversed the conviction. The Salem documents themselves reveal that her crime was not witchcraft but an independence of mind and an unsubmissive character.

== Legacy ==
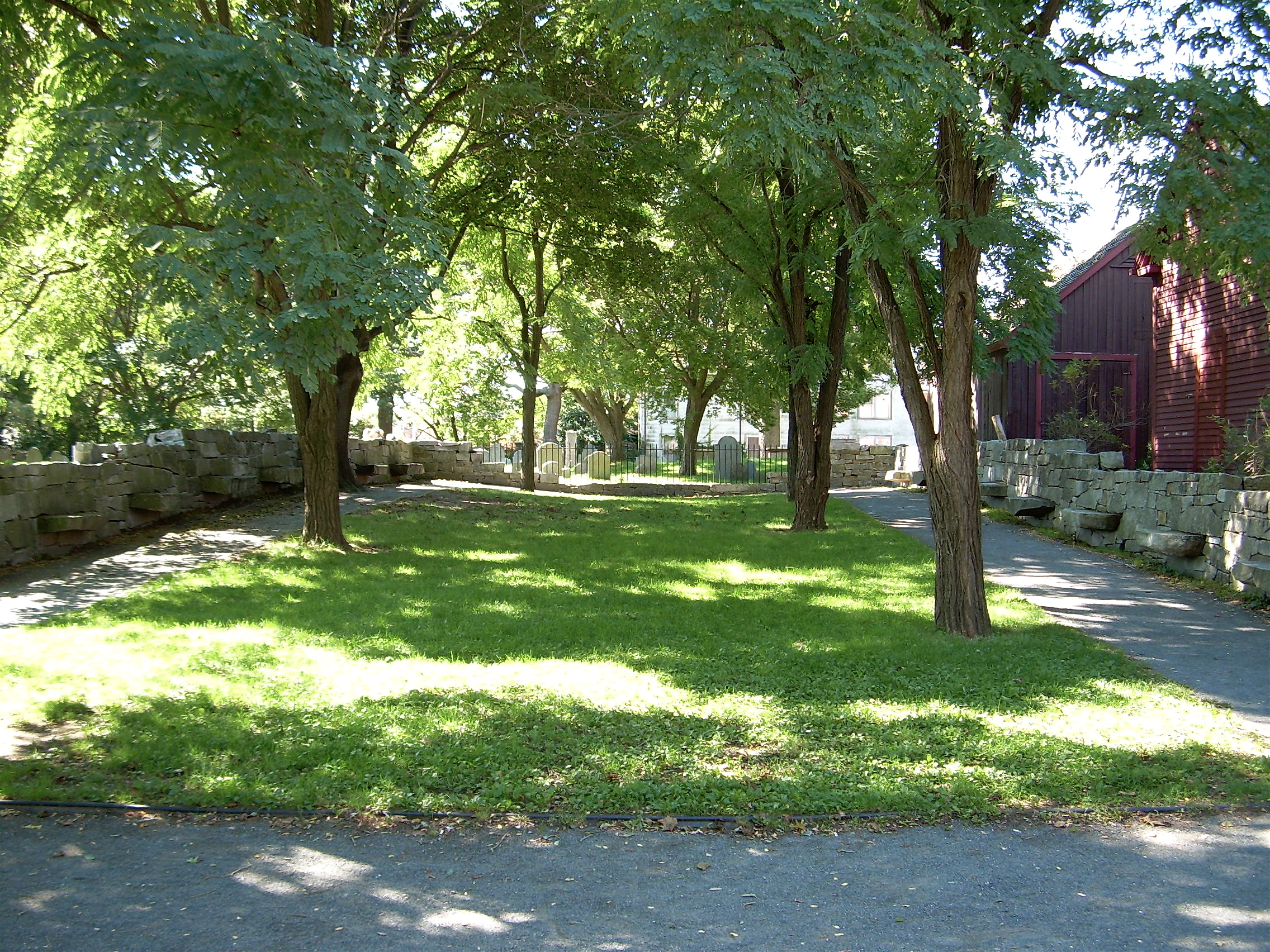
The Salem Witch Trials Memorial Park in Salem

Kathleen Kent, a descendant of Martha, wrote the novel The Heretic's Daughter, which focuses on the persecution of the Carrier family from the point of view of Sarah Carrier during the Salem Witch Trials.

== See also ==
- Salem witch trials
- List of people executed for witchcraft
- List of people of the Salem witch trials

== Sources ==
- Boyer, Paul and Stephen Nissenbaum. (1993) Salem Village Witchcraft: A Documentary Record of Local Conflict in Colonial New England. Boston: Northeastern University Press.
- Hansen, Chadwick. (1969). Witchcraft at Salem. New York, NY: George Baziller.
- Roach, Marilynne K. (2002). The Salem Witch Trials. New York: Taylor Trade Publishing.
- Upham, Charles (1980). Salem Witchcraft. New York: Frederick Ungar Publishing Co.
- Rachel Ames
