= Sarah Morey =

Sarah Morey was a survivor of the Salem witch trials from Beverly, Massachusetts. She was the daughter of Peter Morey and Mary Morey.

== Accusation ==
A complaint was first filed against Morey for "high suspicion of sundry acts of witchcraft upon the body of Mary Walcott" along with George Burroughs, Lydia Dustin, Susannah Martin, Dorcas Hoar, and Phillip English. The accusations were primarily made by young girls within Salem village, including Abigail Williams, Mercy Lewis, Ann Putnam, Elizabeth Hubert, and Susannah Sheldon. A warrant for arrest followed soon after, issued on April 30, 1692 by judges John Hathorne and Jonathan Corwin. Morey was examined and imprisoned along with Phillip English and Dorcas Hoar two days later on May 2 and remained in the Salem village jail house until February 1693.

== Conditions ==
Conditions in the Salem village jail were abysmal for those accused of witchcraft. In addition to uncomfortably small cells which were often bleak, damp, and rat infested, prisoners were charged for each and every item used throughout their imprisonment, including straw bedding, food, and water. This had the potential to be a tremendous financial burden for those who were imprisoned who did not have a source of income; many were found innocent of witchcraft but died in jail due to the massive amounts of debt procured while awaiting their trial. Determined to recover her daughter from the possibility of this form of debtors' prison, Morey's mother Mary later filed a petition of restitution with a committee of the General Court seeking compensation for her daughter's thirty five weeks' diet while imprisoned, as well as several journeys to Boston and Salem. Many families affected by the trials followed suit in pressing for restitution, with the colony eventually passing a bill on October 17, 1711 clearing the names of the convicted and collectively presenting them and their families with around £600.

== Verdict ==
Morey was eventually tried and cleared of all charges.
