= Old Burial Hill (Marblehead, Massachusetts) =

Historic cemetery in Essex County, Massachusetts

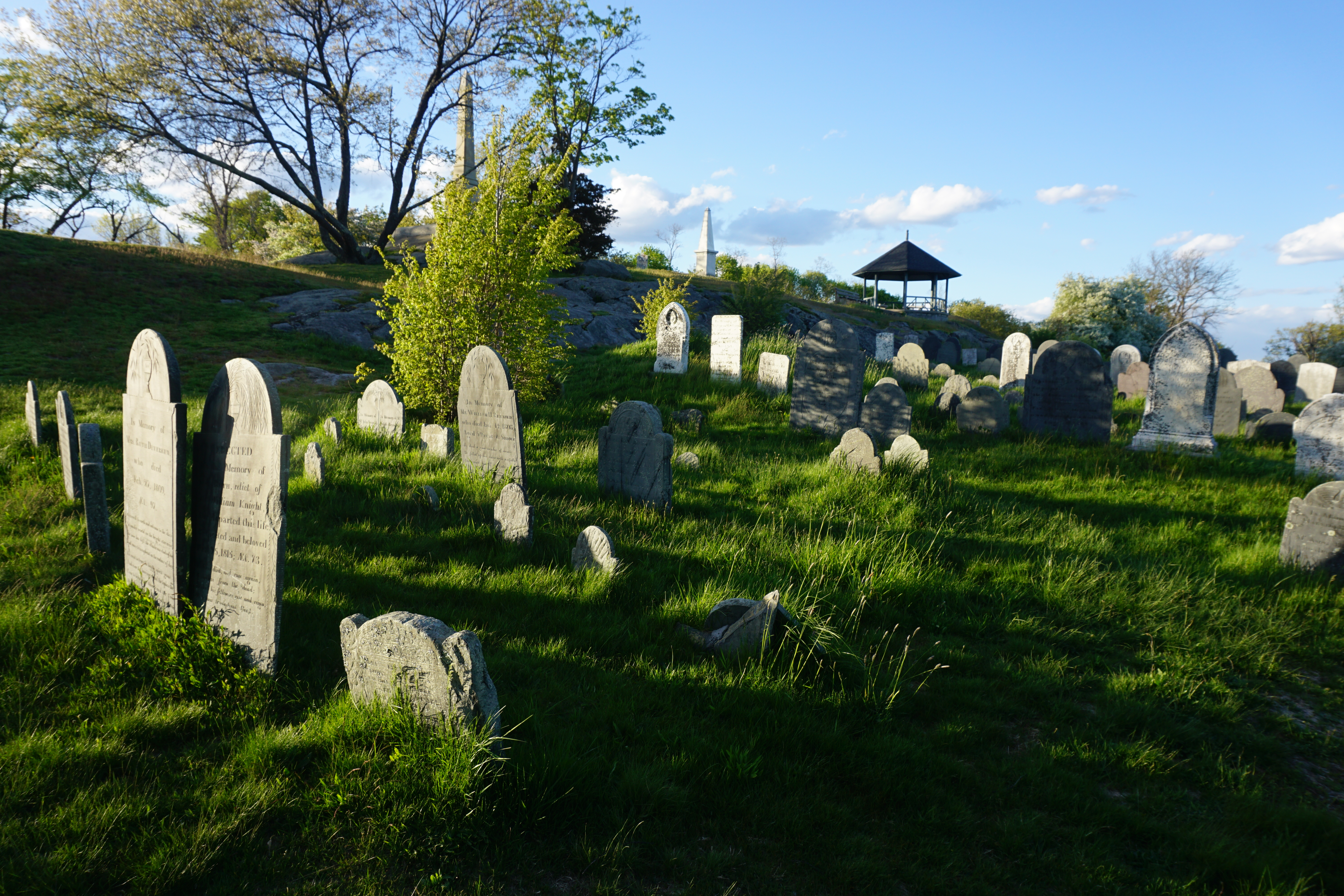
- Interactive map of Old Burial Hill

Details
- Established: 1638
- Location: Marblehead, Massachusetts
- Type: Cemetery
- No. of graves: 1000 approx.

Old Burial Hill is a historic cemetery in Marblehead, Massachusetts. It is located on the high ground between Marblehead's colonial-era residential and retail district, called "Downtown" by longtime residents and "Old Town" by others, and the Barnegat neighborhood that stretches from Little Harbor to Doliber's Cove, and is accessible via a walkway at Redd's Pond and a stairway at the intersection of Orne and Pond streets. It was the location of Marblehead's First Meeting House built around 1638. Old Burial Hill features scenic vistas of Marblehead Harbor and Salem Sound.

The burying ground was founded in 1638 and contains many historic Puritan gravestones featuring diverse stone carving artwork from the seventeenth century. The burial ground also contains a commemorative headstone of Wilmot Redd, victim of the 1692 Salem Witch Trials. It is referenced briefly in the horror author H.P Lovecraft's short-story, "The Festival".

It was the setting of the daytime cemetery scenes in Disney's 1993 Halloween comedy-drama film Hocus Pocus. Select scenes for the film The Good Son (1993) were also filmed here.

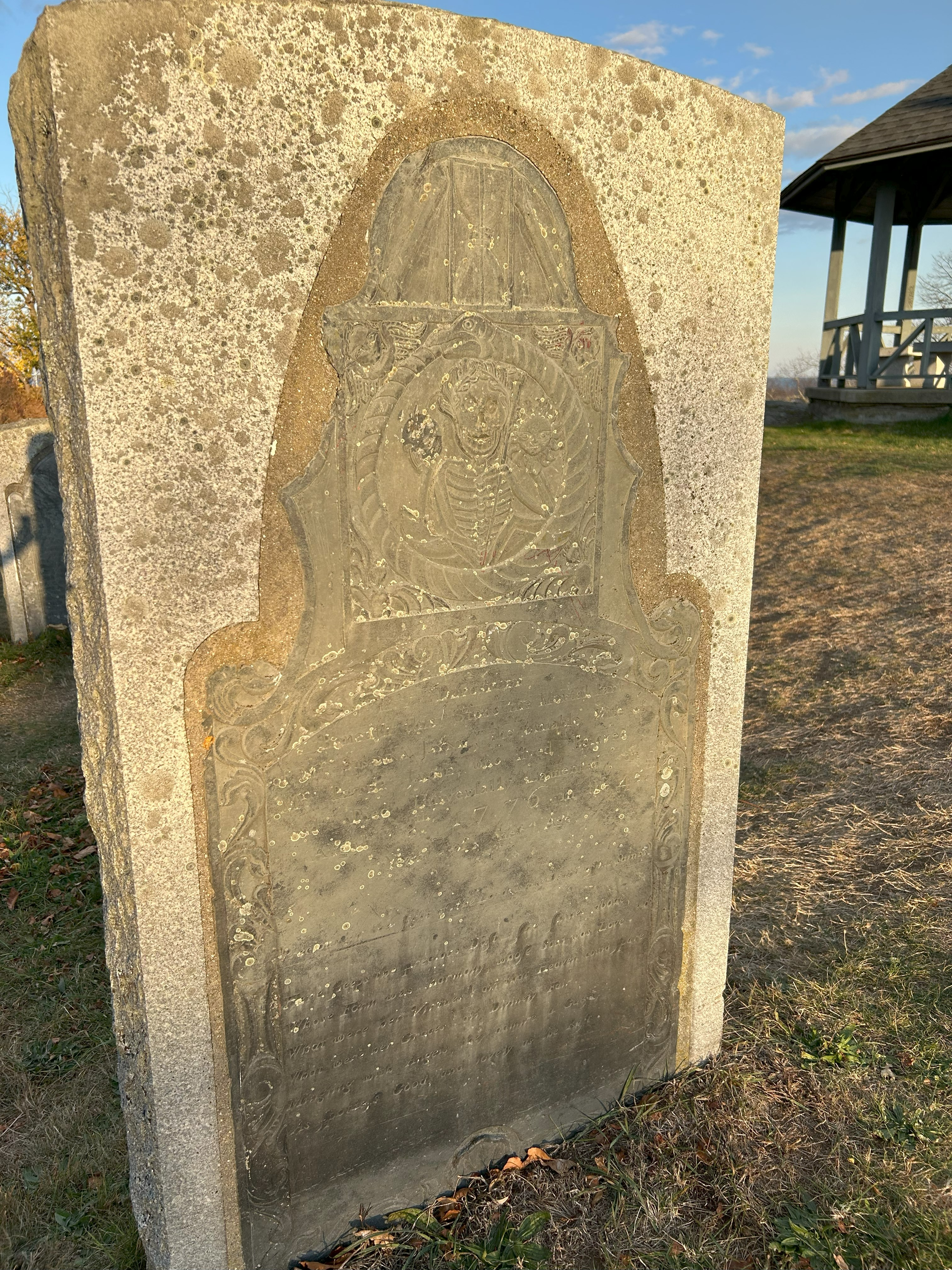
Grave of Susanna Jayne (1776), unique stonework

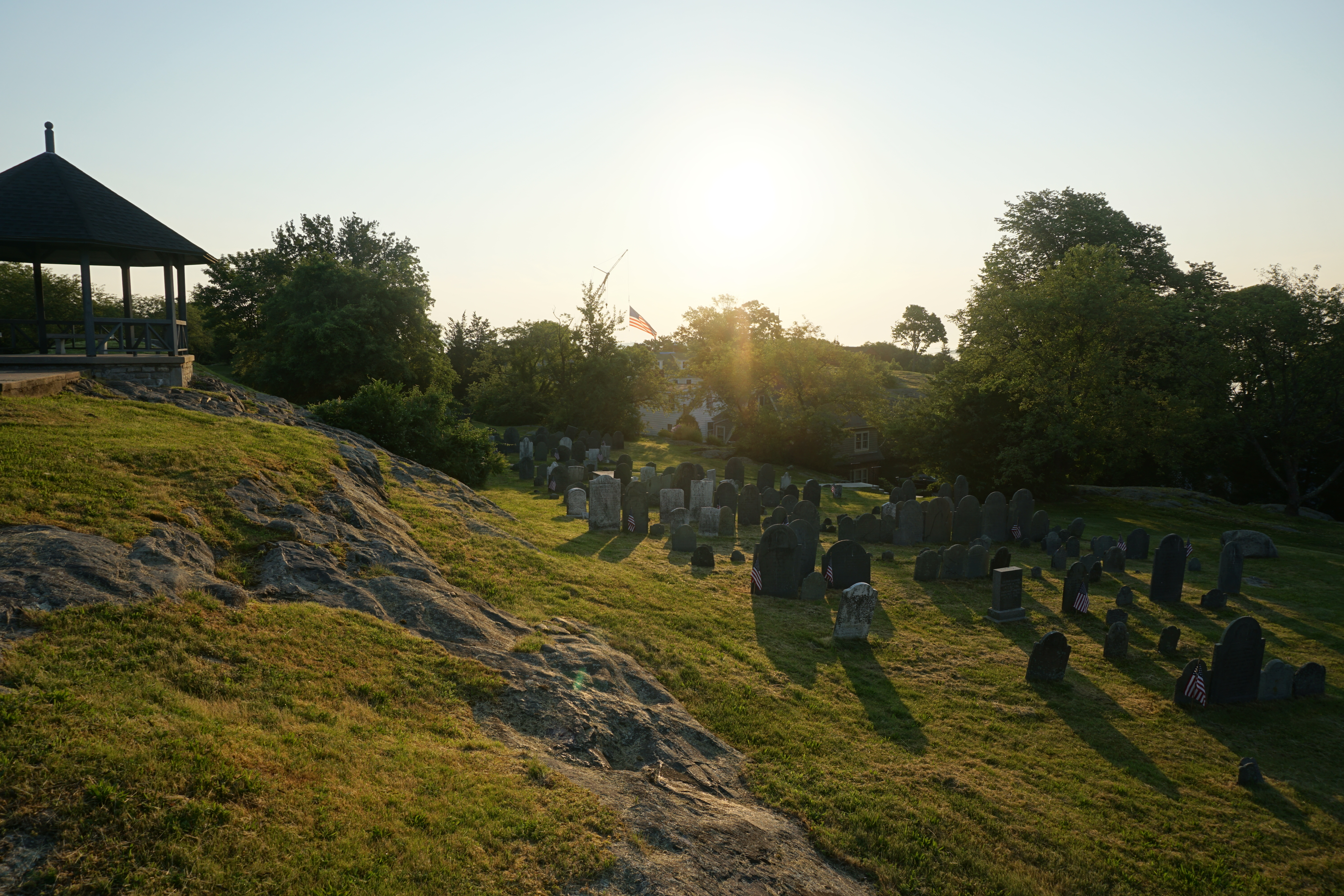
Old Burial Hill

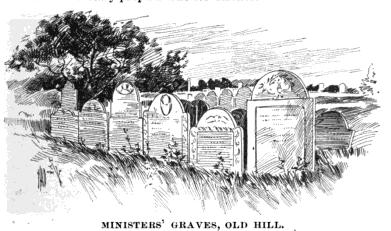
Puritan ministers’ graves on Old Burial Hill

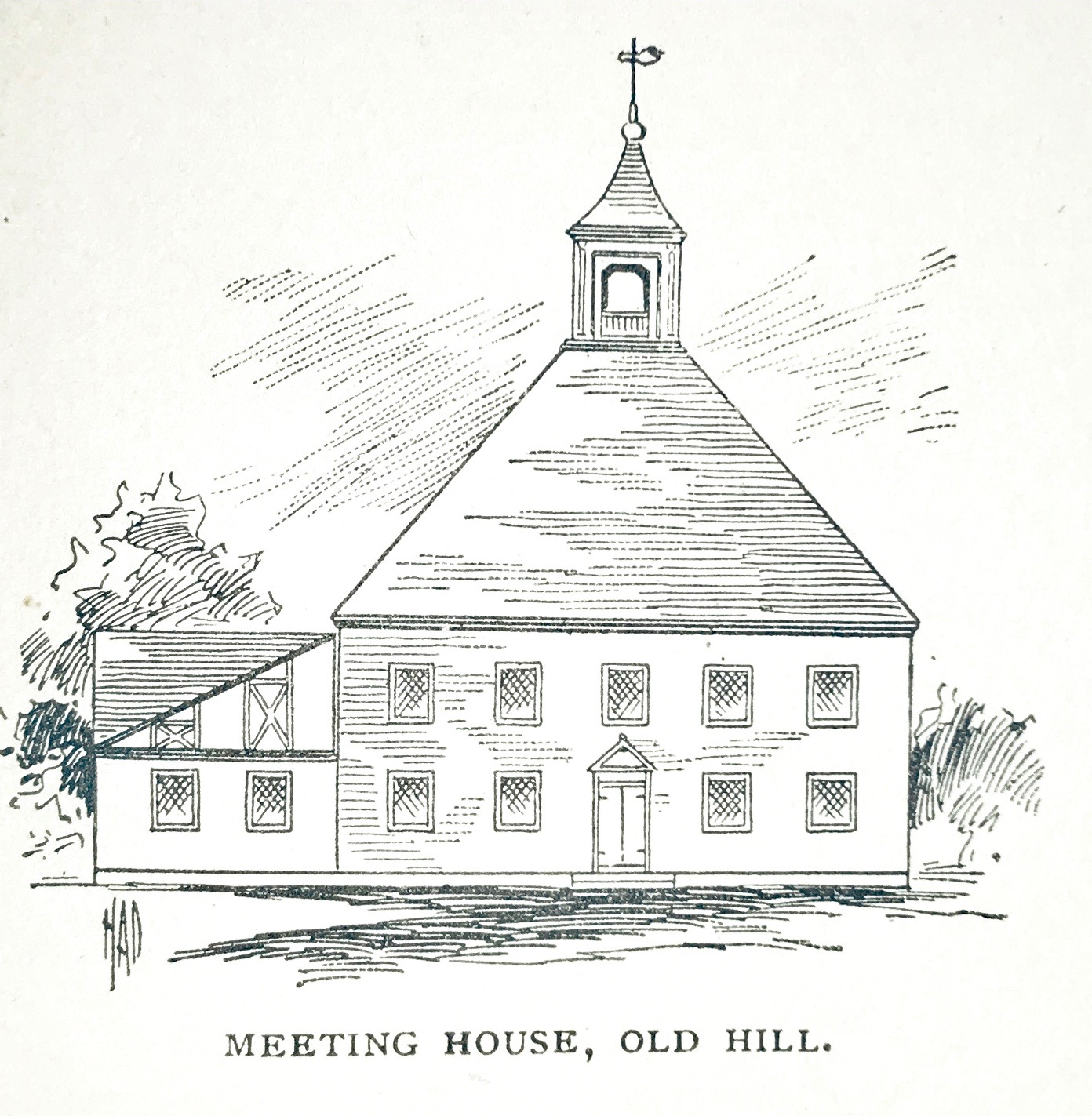
The First Meeting House (1638), located at an unknown location on Old Burial Hill, demolished by 1695.

== Notable burials and cenotaphs ==
- Joseph Brown, known as "Black Joe," Revolutionary war soldier, owner of Black Joe's Tavern
- General John Glover, Revolutionary War general
- Timothy Dexter, businessman
- Wilmot Redd, victim of 1692 Salem Witch Trials
- Agnes (or Agnis), enslaved woman
