= Elizabeth Booth =

American colonist

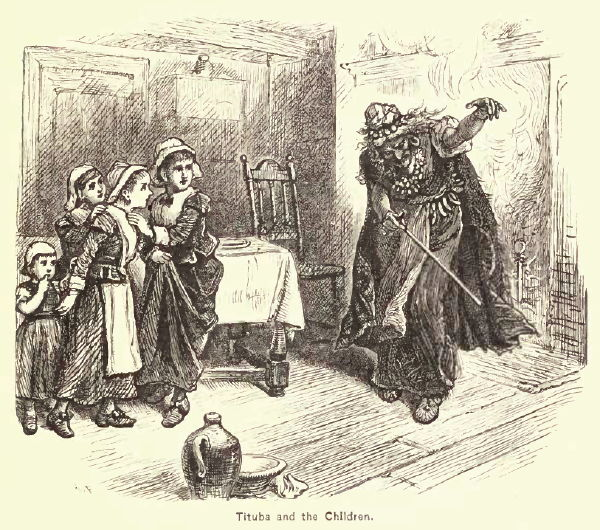
- Representation of "Tituba and the Children"
- Born: 1674; Salem Village, Massachusetts
- Died: N/A
- Known for: Being one of the accusers in the salem witch trials
- Spouse: Israel Shaw
- Children: Israel Shaw and Susanna Shaw

Elizabeth Booth was born in 1674 and was one of the accused as well as one of the accusers in the Salem Witch Trials. She grew up in Salem, Massachusetts, as the second of ten children. When she was sixteen she was accused of being a witch. When she was eighteen, she began accusing people (ten people on record) of practicing witchcraft, including John Proctor, Elizabeth Proctor, Sarah Proctor, William Proctor, Benjamin Proctor, Woody Proctor, Giles Corey, Martha Corey, Job Tookey, and Wilmont Redd. Five of these people were executed due to Booth's testimony (John Proctor, Woody Proctor, Giles Corey, Martha Corey, and Wilmont Redd). Elizabeth Proctor would have been executed as well if she was not pregnant. After the Witch Trials, Booth married Israel Shaw on December 26, 1695, and had two children named Israel (born December 16, 1698) and Susanna (born September 29, 1703). Booth's death date is unknown.

== Life before the trial ==
Booth was born in 1674 in the Salem Village to George Booth Sr. and Alice Temple. Her parents were married some time before 1671 in Lynn/Salem, Massachusetts. She was the second eldest of ten siblings who included: George Booth Jr., Alice Booth, Benjamin Booth, Bridget Booth, Mary Booth, Rebecca Booth, Susanna Booth, and Zachariah Booth. Along with her ten siblings she had two in-law siblings. Booth was baptized on May 19, 1678, at age five, in Salem, Massachusetts along with several of her siblings: Bridget Booth, Rebecca Booth, and Zachariah Booth. When Booth was eight years old, her biological father, a woodworker, died. Her mother remarried and her stepfather died only four years later. Finally, at age eighteen, Booth claimed to be afflicted by witchcraft and became one of the six accusers of the Salem Witch Trials.

== Booth's role in the Salem Witch Trials ==
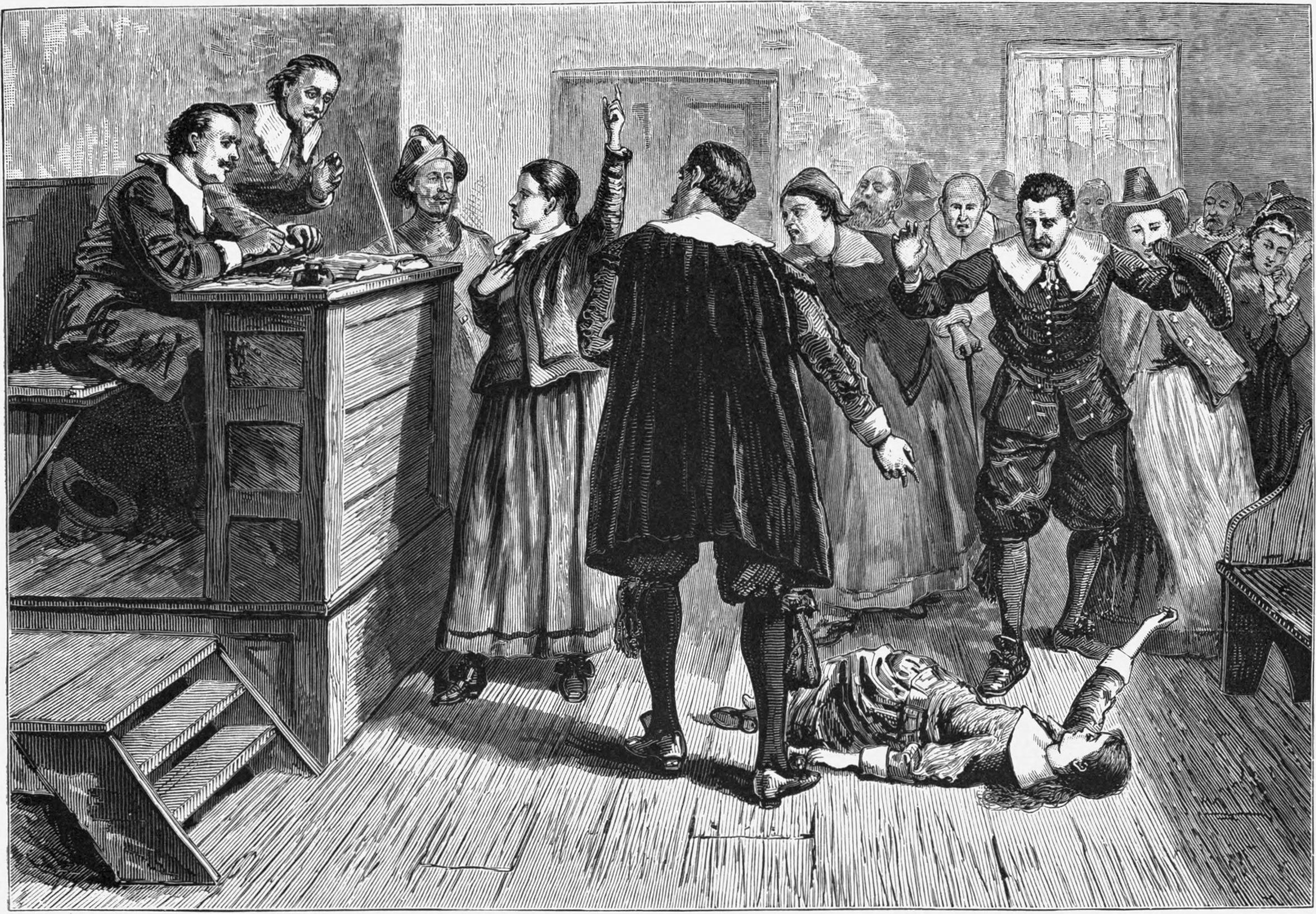
The central figure in this 1876 illustration of the courtroom is usually identified as Mary Walcott.

=== Accusations against Booth ===
Booth is remembered in American colonial history for her role in the infamous Salem Witch Trials of 1692. Commotion about witches in Salem had begun in January 1692. Witchcraft was first suspected within the Parris household, a family residing Salem Village. Reverend Samuel Parris had never completed his education at Harvard University and settled for the ministerial position in Salem. At the time, Reverend Parris had a slave, named Tituba working in his household. There were rumors that she told the girls stories and "did other sorts of practices". After this, Betty Paris and Abigail Williams, nine and eleven years old, began to experiment with white magic.

In February 1692, both Paris and Williams began acting suspiciously, catching the attention of many. The girls fell into trances, crouched in the corner of rooms, saying things that were not sensible, and threw "fits" consisting of screaming and epileptic symptoms. "Their bodies supposedly twisted as though their bones were made of putty." This behavior spread to six other girls in Salem Village, one being the sixteen year old Booth, making her one of the accusers. An assortment of doctors came to Salem to examine the girls, but nothing was concluded from their behavior. Then, Dr. William Griggs diagnosed the symptoms as stemming from witchcraft. The girls continued to have these symptoms, having episodes of "fits" and then afterward being perfectly fine. "Asked what or who had caused them to suffer so, they could not answer. Authorities began questioning people exhibiting suspicious behavior to determine if they may have caused or influenced the condition of the afflicted girls. Tituba was one of those questioned and she confessed she knew of four witches and had knowledge of the behavior and actions the witches had taken. She confessed that she herself had attempted to murder children while under the influence of a specter. This confession made the girl's claim of seeing specters valid, and vastly aided the witch trials.

=== Accusations against others ===
Booth, at age eighteen, was one of the six accusers in the 1692 Salem Witch Trials in Salem, Massachusetts, claiming that she was afflicted by witchcraft. Throughout the trials, there are records indicating that she accused ten people of witchcraft. Five of those accused are known to be executed directly due to her testimonies. Those she accused include: John and Elizabeth Proctor, their fifteen-year-old daughter Sarah, William and Benjamin Proctor (two of their sons), Woody Proctor, Giles Corey and Martha Corey, Job Tookey, and Wilmont Redd.

== Specifics of trials ==
=== How the trials went ===
Booth's most significant accusation was against John and Elizabeth Proctor. She then went on to accuse their daughter, Sarah Proctor. Booth's reputation stemmed from being one of the accused to becoming the accuser and using her experience against others. The records show that twenty-five people in Salem, MA were either executed or sentenced to life in jail. During the trials, various tests were performed on the accused to determine if they were in fact witches. One commonly used test was the "touching test." During this test an affected person would be required to throw a "tantrum", and then the accused had to touch the victim. If the victim calmed after being touched, the accused was a witch because it was believed "the 'evil toxins' that had tormented the afflicted soul returned back to the host." A lot of people did not want to come forward, so the courts often used a form of torture to get a confession. "Dunking" was a common form. The accused would be continuously dunked underwater until the court received a confession.

=== Specific testimonies ===
Booth's historical legacy as one of the six accusers in the 1692 Salem Witch Trials began on May 20, 1692, when she accused John and Elizabeth Proctor of committing the murders of a minimum of four people. She testified that the specters of those murdered had come to tell her they had been killed by the Proctors and begged Elizabeth to stop the murders. Her testimony, aided by her sister Alice's and her mother's support, convicted the Proctors of witchcraft and both were sentenced to be executed. However, Elizabeth Proctor was pregnant with her sixth child and she was placed in jail instead to await the birth of her child. Once the trials ended, Elizabeth Proctor was reprieved and released.

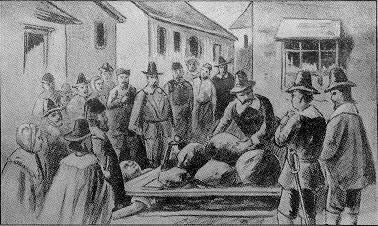
Giles Corey was pressed to death during the Salem witch trials in the 1690s

Following the trial of Elizabeth and John Proctor, Booth accused Goody Proctor of murder/witchcraft. She testified that her deceased stepfather had come to her and informed her that Goody had murdered him. Later, Booth would accuse Giles Corey of "acting as a ringleader" when "fifty specters had flooded into their rural home for a devil's communion of wine and bread." He spent five months in jail bound by chains before he was crushed to death. On June 8, 1692, Elizabeth testified that Martha Corey (Giles Corey's wife) had murdered Thomas Goold Senyer. She said that “Thomas Goold Senyer came to her and told her that Martha said she would murder him if he did not do well by Goodman Parker's children.” On September 22, 1692, just three days after her husband's execution, Martha Cory was convicted and hanged. She was one of the last people to be executed during the Salem Witch Trials. On that same day, Wilmont Redd was also executed for the affliction of witchcraft towards Booth despite most evidence being speculation and not factual. Booth also claimed that Job Trooney tried to afflict her and others with witchcraft. Along with Booth's testimony, another accuser, Susannah Sheldon, also testified against Job Trooney. They claimed on June 7, 1692, he made eight other people in the town "cry and want revenge". Their testimony also claimed that “he looked as red as blood". However, the jury ruled that Sheldon wasn't a credible source due to her testimony being "overly visual and dramatic". That ruling also affected Booth's testimony against Tooney; meaning that he could not be convicted due to lack of substantial evidence.

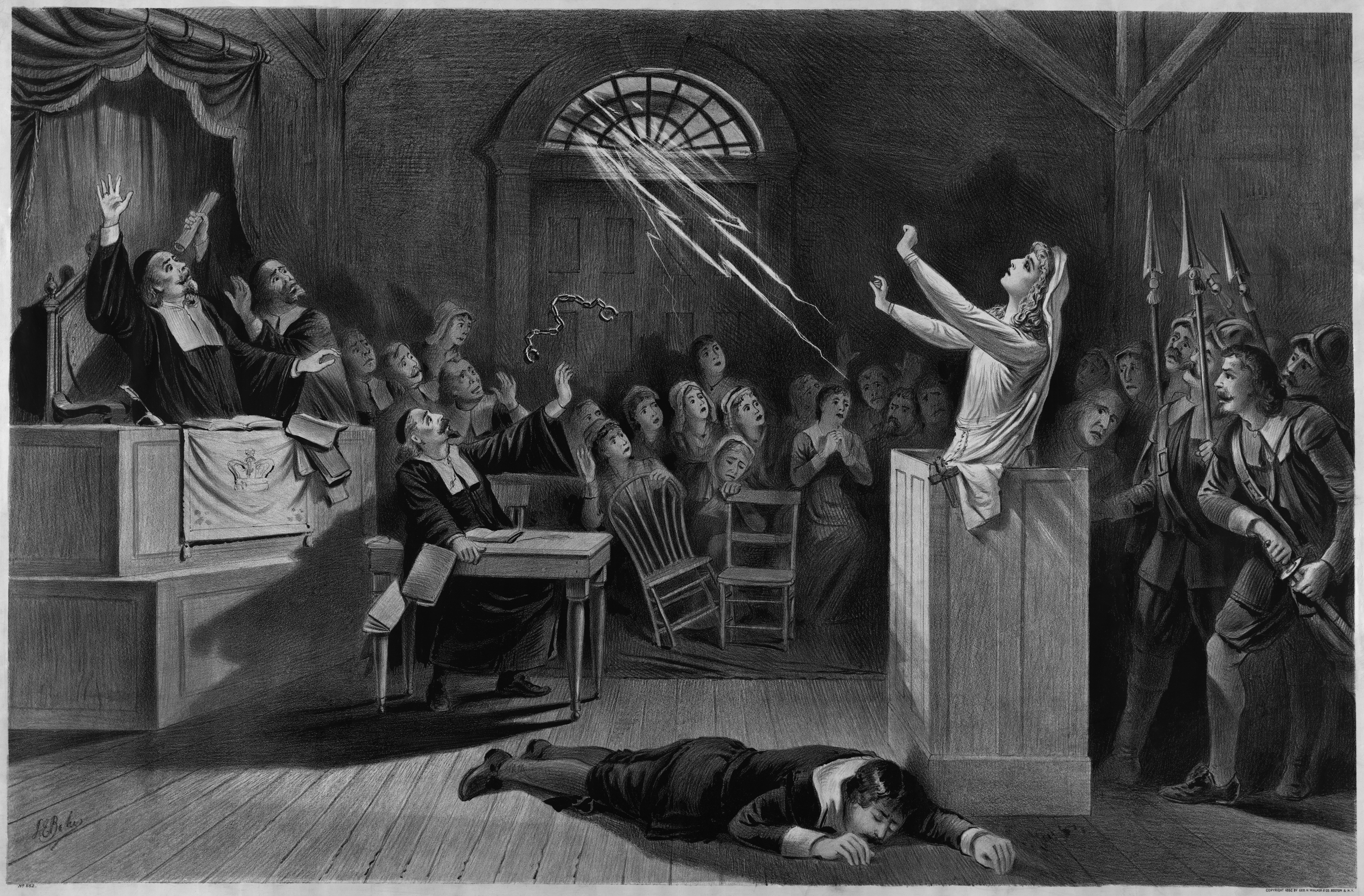
Fanciful representation of the Salem witch trials, lithograph from 1892

== Life after the trial ==
=== Marriage and children ===
Booth grew up in a home where both her father and stepfather died in the span of four years. Her father died when she was just eight years old. Her mother, Alice, remarried to George Booth, but just four years after their marriage, he died. Elizabeth grew up having to help her mother provide for the family, which was now her mother Alice, her younger brother George, and younger sister Alice. Booth worried about her marital status and if she would have any prospects after these two tragedies occurred in her family, so soon after one another. Two years after the witchcraft trials, Booth married Israel Shaw on December 26, 1695. She was twenty two years old and the two were married in Salem, Essex co., MA. Israel Shaw was born in July 1680, his parents were William Shaw I and Elizabeth Fraile. He was the youngest of four siblings. Booth and Israel Shaw had two children. Their first, a son, Israel was born on December 16, 1698. They subsequently had daughter Susanna, born five years later on September 29, 1703. There is no documentation regarding their children's deaths, marriage, or offspring.

Most of the accusers and judges did not show remorse for their actions. After the trials, the accusers were “lost to history” according to a Salem historian. There has only been one public apology from the accusers of the Salem Witch Trials, Ann Putnam. During the trials, she accused sixty-two people of witchcraft. She claimed that she was possessed by the devil himself. There is no current documentation of when or how Elizabeth Booth Shaw died.
