= Abigail Faulkner =

American women accused of witchcraft

Abigail Faulkner (née Dane; October 13, 1652 – February 5, 1730), sometimes called Abigail Faulkner Sr., was an American woman accused of witchcraft during the Salem witch trials in 1692. In the frenzy that followed, Faulkner's sister Elizabeth (Dane) Johnson (1641–1722), her sister-in-law Deliverance Dane, two of her daughters, two of her nieces, and a nephew, would all be accused of witchcraft and arrested. Faulkner was convicted and sentenced to death, but her execution was delayed due to pregnancy. Before she gave birth, Faulkner was pardoned by the governor and released from prison.

== Family ==
Abigail Dane was born on October 13, 1652, in Andover, Massachusetts, the daughter of Reverend Francis Dane and Elizabeth Ingalls. Faulkner was the sister of Elizabeth Johnson, and sister-in-law of Deliverance Dane, both of whom were accused of witchcraft in Salem during the 1692 hysteria. Abigail (Dane) Faulkner's two daughters, Abigail Faulkner and Dorothy Faulkner, were also accused of witchcraft. All of these survived the trials.

On October 12, 1675, Abigail married Lieutenant Francis Faulkner. The Dane and Faulkner families were early settlers who had gained social prominence in Andover.

Francis and Abigail Faulkner had at least eight children:

1. Elizabeth Faulkner born July 4, 1676, in Andover. Died August 17, 1678, in Andover.
2. Elizabeth Faulkner born December 7, 1678, in Andover. Married to John Butrick.
3. Dorothy Faulkner born February 15, 1680, in Andover. Married to Samuel Nurse on November 25, 1708.
4. Abigail Faulkner (Jr.) born August 12, 1683, in Andover. Married to Thomas Lamson on April 6, 1708.
5. Frances Faulkner was born on April 29, 1686, in Andover. Married on May 12, 1724, to Daniel Faulkner, her first cousin.
6. Edmund Faulkner was born on April 2, 1688, in Andover. Married first to Elizabeth Marston on February 19, 1715. Married second on August 17, 1730, to Dorcas Buckston.
7. Ammi Ruhamah (which symbolically means "my people have obtained mercy") Faulkner was born on March 20, 1693, in Andover. Married to Hannah Ingalls on June 7, 1726, a second cousin through his maternal grandmother, Elizabeth Ingalls Dane.
8. Paul Faulkner

Faulkner's grandson, Colonel Francis Faulkner, led a company at the Battle of Concord, and commanded the regiment that guarded General John Burgoyne while he was a prisoner of war.

== Prelude to prosecution ==
Nothing in the court records of Andover indicates that Abigail Faulkner had been accused, let alone found guilty, of any crimes or misconduct prior to 1692. However, her sister, Elizabeth Johnson Sr., was something of a scarlet woman, having been tried for fornication several years before.

The one feature that distinguished the Danes and the Faulkners from their neighbors was their comparative wealth. In 1675, roughly twelve years before his death, Edmund Faulkner bequeathed the bulk of his estate to Francis Faulkner, his eldest son, then just twenty-four. This made young Francis an influential figure in Andover, while his contemporaries were still working their parents' land, destined to wait several more years before they could accumulate enough money to marry and become landowners. In 1687, Edmund Faulkner died, and Francis inherited the remainder of his father's estate, excepting only a very minor portion left to his sisters and brother.

Not long after his father's death, Francis Faulkner became ill, suffering from convulsions, confusion and memory loss, leaving him unable to manage his own affairs. Abigail Faulkner was granted control of her husband's estate until their sons came of age. As the manager of his estate, Abigail wielded more power than most of the men in Andover, including her own brother-in-law.

Another point of contention within the community concerned Abigail Faulkner's father. Reverend Dane had served as Andover's minister for more than forty years when the witchcraft trials began in 1692. As the frenzy in Salem progressed, Dane openly expressed doubts regarding the accusations made by Ann Putnam and others; he was disturbed by the fanatical nature of the proceedings.

Dane was indeed to fight the plague with a heroism unequalled by any who had choice in the matter, risking not only his own life and reputation, but what must have come harder, the lives of nearly all the womenfolk in his family. And in this fight he was at first alone, deserted by his own deacons who regarded him at best as an old and failing man, too far behind the times to appreciate the methods of modern science.

Reverend Dane was accused of witchcraft in 1692, but was never charged. It is known that a decade prior to the witch trials, Dane had sued the residents of Andover for a salary increase. The court found in Dane's favor, ordering the town to raise his salary, and to provide an adequate sum to pay for an assistant to be hired. Dane had also opposed a proposal by several residents that Andover be divided into two precincts.

Economic tensions and her husband's illness, in addition to the doubts her father expressed regarding the accusers, may have caused Faulkner to become an object of suspicion, envy, and resentment within her community.

== Salem witch trials ==
Things came to a head in early August 1692, when Elizabeth Johnson's daughter and namesake was accused of witchcraft and arrested. Faulkner's niece quickly confessed, telling her examiners on August 10, that she had consorting with the devil, meeting him at a gathering of "about six score".

Faulkner was soon accused of witchcraft by neighbors who claimed she had "afflicted" their children. On August 11, she was arrested and taken to Salem, where she was interrogated by Jonathan Corwin, John Hathorne and Captain John Higginson.

Most of her accusers were young women from Salem, among them Ann Putnam Jr. and Mary Warren. An exception to this, was the middle-aged William Barker Sr., who stated under examination that he had been afflicted for three years by the devil. He confessed that he had signed the devil's book, and that Satan had promised to "pay all his debts" and allow him to live in luxury. He stated that George Burroughs was the "ringleader", but claimed that Faulkner and her sister, Elizabeth Johnson Sr., were his "enticers to this great abomination."

When Faulkner entered the room, her accusers would fall down to the floor in hysterics. She held a handkerchief in her hands while she was examined, and whenever she would squeeze or twist the cloth, her accusers would have "grievous fitts". When magistrates demanded to know why she harmed the girls, asking her to look at their distress, Faulkner told the magistrates that she was "sorry the girls were afflicted", but that she had not afflicted them, "it is the devil [who] does it in my shape." The magistrates responded by asking, if she was innocent, why did Faulkner shed no tears over the girls' suffering. She refused to confess, insisting "God would not have her confess that [which] she was not guilty of."

At one point during the examination, Mary Warren fell into "fitts", and was "pulled under the table," apparently unable to come out from under it, but after receiving "a touch of said Faulkner" she was freed.

On August 29, Faulkner's eleven-year-old niece and fourteen-year-old nephew, Abigail and Stephen Johnson, were also arrested on charges of witchcraft.

Faulkner was reexamined the next day in prison, still insisting she had never consorted with the devil, nor signed his book, but did admit to feeling animosity toward her family's accusers. She suggested that the devil had taken advantage of this, in essence framing her for the crime of witchcraft. She had been "angry at what folks said" when her niece was "taken up" for witchcraft. Neighbors had crowded round the Johnson home, laughing, taunting Faulkner, telling her that soon her sister would also be arrested for witchcraft:

and she [Faulkner] did look with an evil eye on ye afflicted persons consenting that they should be afflicted because they were the cause of bringing her kindred out, and she did wish them ill, that her spirit being roused, she did pitch her hands together. She knew not but that the devil might take advantage, but it was the devil, not she, that afflicted them.

On August 31, her sister and nephew confessed to witchcraft. They testified that they had attended a gathering where they were baptized by the devil, who promised them "happiness and joy", and that at the devil's behest, they had afflicted Martha Sprague and several people in Andover. They refused to implicate anyone else in their activities.

On September 8, Faulkner's sister-in-law, Deliverance Dane, confessed to witchcraft under examination, though she would later recant insisting that she had "wronged the truth" by confessing. Faulkner's nine-year-old daughter Abigail was accused of witchcraft and arrested on September 16. The next day her twelve-year-old daughter Dorothy was arrested on the same charge. Faulkner's young daughters confessed soon after their arrest, and were persuaded to condemn their mother as a witch.

One day later, Ann Putnam Jr. testified that she had been "afflicted" by Faulkner on August 9, 1692, and that she had witnessed Faulkner or her specter tormenting two other young women.

Faulkner's sentence read:

The Jury find Abigail Faulkner, wife of Francis Faulkner of Andover, guilty of ye felony of witchcraft, committed on ye body of Martha Sprague, also on ye body of Sarah Phelps. Sentence of death passed on Abigail Faulkner.

Faulkner was pregnant when brought to trial, and for this reason, her execution was delayed.

== Aftermath and exoneration ==
In December 1692, four months after her arrest, Faulkner petitioned Governor Phips pleading for clemency. She explained that her husband was an invalid, and though his condition had been stable, her arrest caused him to suffer a relapse, leaving her children with no caretaker and "little or nothing to subsist on." Governor Phips granted her request; she was pardoned and released from prison.

Though released, her name had not been cleared. In 1703, Faulkner petitioned the court asking that she be legally exonerated.

The pardon so far had its effect that I am as yet suffered to live, but this only as a malefactor, convicted upon record of ye most heinous crimes, which besides its utter ruining and defacing my reputation will certainly expose myself to imminent danger of new accusations which will be ye more readily believed, and will remain a perpetual brand of infamy upon my family. I do humbly pray that this high and honorable court will plan to take my case into serious consideration, and order the defacing of ye record against me, so that I may be freed from the evil consequences thereof.

Faulkner petitioned the court for eleven years before they finally granted her request, reversing the bill of attainder in 1711.

Upon the humble Petition and suit of several of the said persons and of the children of others of them whose Parents were Executed. Be it Declared and Enacted by his Excellency the Governor Council and Representatives in General Court assembled, and by the authority of the same That the several convictions Judgments and Attainders against the said George Burroughs, John Proctor, George Jacobs, John Willard, Giles Corey and Martha Corey, Rebecca Nurse, Sarah Good, Elizabeth How, Mary Eastey, Sarah Wildes, Abigail Hobbs, Samuel Wardwell, Mary Parker, Martha Carrier, Abigail Faulkner, Anne Foster, Rebecca Eames, Mary Post, Mary Lacey, Mary Bradbury, and Dorcas Hoar, and every of them Be and hereby are reversed made and declared to be null and void to all Intents, Constructions and purposes whatsoever, as if no such convictions Judgments, or Attainders had ever been had or given. And that no penalties or Forfeitures of Goods or Chattels be by the said Judgments and attainders or either of them had or Incurred. Any Law Usage or Custom to the contrary notwithstanding. And that no Sheriff, Constable, Jailer or other officer shall be Liable to any prosecution in the Law for anything they then Legally did in the execution of their respective offices. Made and passed by the Great and General Court or Assembly of Her Majesty's Province of the Massachusetts Bay in New England held at Boston the 17th day of October, 1711.

Faulkner's daughters were released from prison in October 1692, along with their cousins Stephen and Abigail Johnson, on a £500 bond paid by Nathaniel Dane and John Osgood. Her niece, Elizabeth Johnson Jr., was found guilty of witchcraft, and sentenced to death in January 1693. Her death warrant was signed by William Stoughton. Elizabeth, like her aunt, managed to escape the gallows due to the intervention of Governor Phips. Faulkner's sister, Elizabeth Johnson Sr., was acquitted and released in January 1693, but her attainder was never reversed. Faulkner's sister-in-law, Deliverance Dane, was released in December 1692, when the case against her was dismissed.

Abigail Dane Faulkner died in Andover, Massachusetts, on February 5, 1730. Her husband, Francis Faulkner, died in Andover two years later on September 19, 1732.

One of Faulkner's descendants is Salon.com film critic Andrew O'Hehir.
