= Francis Dane =

Minister during the Salem witch trials (1615–1697)

Rev. Francis Dane
- Born: 20 November 1615; Bishop's Stortford, Hertfordshire, England
- Died: 17 February 1697 (aged 81); Andover, Massachusetts, Province of Massachusetts Bay
- Education: King's College, Cambridge
- Occupations: Minister; pastor
- Known for: Opposing the Salem witch trials
- Spouses: Elizabeth Ingalls (died 1676) Mary Thomas (died 1689) Hannah Chandler Abbot (m. 1690)
- Children: 6
- Parents: John Dane; Frances (Bowyer) Dane

Rev. Francis Dane (20 November 1615 – 17 February 1697) was an English minister who was active in Andover, Massachusetts in the latter half of the 17th century. He was baptized in Bishop's Stortford, England, where it is possible he was also born. He is notable in the history of Colonial America for publicly opposing and consequently entangling his family in the Salem witch trials that took place in Massachusetts beginning in 1692.

== Education ==
Francis Dane matriculated as a sizar at King's College, Cambridge in Easter term 1633 and emigrated to Massachusetts with his parents, John and Frances (née Bowyer) Dane, in 1636.

== Career ==
Dane became the second pastor of the North Parish Andover, Massachusetts in 1649.

In 1658 when the subject of witchcraft first came to his attention, he came down decidedly against the concept. When John Godfrey was charged with injuring the wife of Job Tyler by "Satanic acts", Dane judged against the probability.

Around 1680, when Francis Dane was about sixty-five years of age, church members became concerned about his ability to fulfill his role leading the church and requested that a younger minister be sent to them. In January 1682, Rev. Thomas Barnard, a recent graduate of Harvard, arrived. Shortly following Barnard's arrival, Francis Dane's salary was stopped. Dane petitioned the General Court in Boston to have it reinstated. The town complied, but split the salary of 80 pounds a year so that Dane received thirty pounds and Barnard received fifty. Neither man was pleased with the solution.

=== Salem Witch Trials ===
Dane had lived in Andover for 44 years, and was 76 years old when the Salem Witch Trials began. On October 18, 1692, Dane, Thomas Barnard, and twenty-three others wrote a letter to the governor and to the General Court publicly condemning the witch trials.

Dane and his family were in danger as half a dozen family members stood accused, including Francis Dane himself. Another minister, George Burroughs, had been hanged, and thus Dane's status did not guarantee protection. He warned that his people were guilty of blood for accepting unfounded accusations against covenanted members of the church. Two of Francis Dane's daughters, Elizabeth Dane Johnson and Abigail Dane Faulkner, and his daughter-in-law, Deliverance Dane, were all arrested. Deliverance was in prison for 13 weeks. Abigail Dane Faulkner's two daughters, Abigail Faulkner (Lamson) and Dorothy Faulkner (Nurse), were also accused of witchcraft. All of these survived the trials.

Dane's daughter, Abigail Faulkner Sr., was convicted and condemned in September 1692 but given a temporary stay of execution because she was pregnant. She was later pardoned by the governor and released. Although Dane's extended family had the most accused of any family, none of his immediate family members was executed, except Elizabeth Jackson Howe (executed July 19, 1692), wife of James Howe, Jr. (or How). Martha Carrier, Dane's niece, was also executed as a witch August 19, 1692.

== Personal life ==
By his first wife, Elizabeth Ingalls (1618–1676), Francis had six children, two sons and four daughters:

- Elizabeth Dane Johnson (1641–1722),
- Nathaniel Dane (1645–1725),
- Hannah Dane Goodhue (1648–1712),
- Phebe Dane Robinson (1650–1726),
- Abigail Dane Faulkner (1652–1730),
- Francis Dane (1656–1738).

He married twice more. His second wife was Mary Thomas (m. ?–1689; her death), and his third wife was Hannah Chandler Abbot (m. 1690–1697; his death).

== Death ==
He died in Andover on 17 February 1696.
