= Sarah Cole =

Sarah Cole may refer to:

- Sarah (Aslett) Cole (1661-1740), accused of witchcraft during the Salem witch trials
- Sarah Cole (painter) (1805–1857), American landscape painter
- Sarah Cole (writer), American writer and academic administrator
- Sarah Rudolph Cole, American legal scholar
