= Joe Frogger =

Cookie

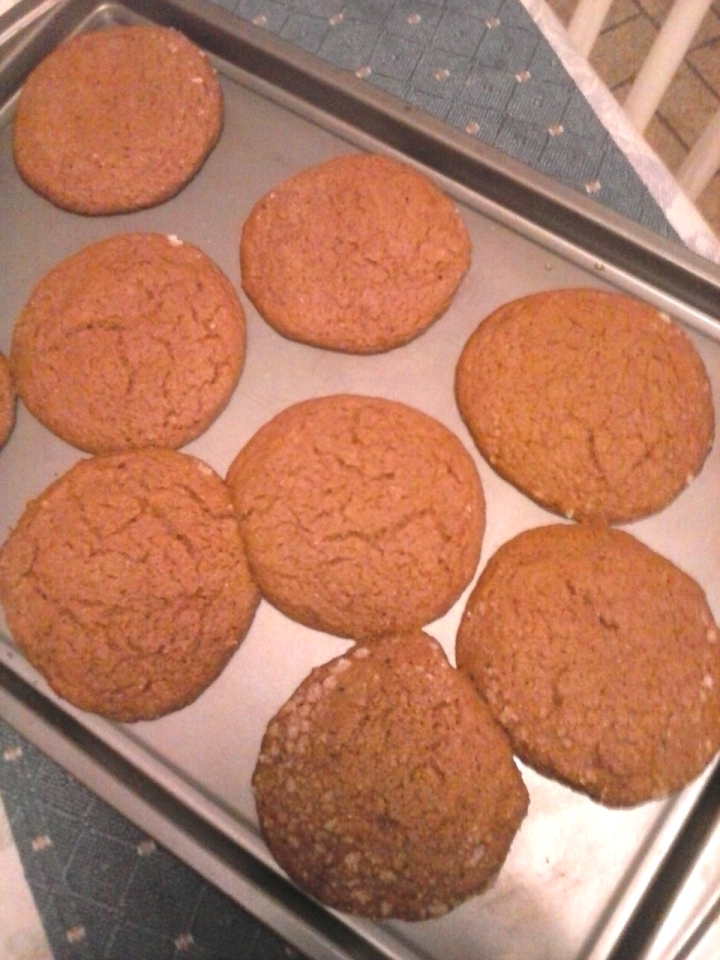
- Type: Cookie
- Place of origin: Marblehead, Massachusetts, U.S.
- Created by: Lucretia Brown
- Main ingredients: Molasses, rum, spices

The Joe Frogger is a type of cookie that has been popular in New England since the late 18th century. It is flavored with molasses, rum, and spices (ginger, allspice, nutmeg, cloves) and has a soft, chewy center. Because the cookies kept well they could be taken on long sea voyages, and so became popular with fishermen and sailors. The original cookies were the size of pancakes and were cooked in an iron skillet; those made today are typically smaller, and baked in an oven.

== History ==
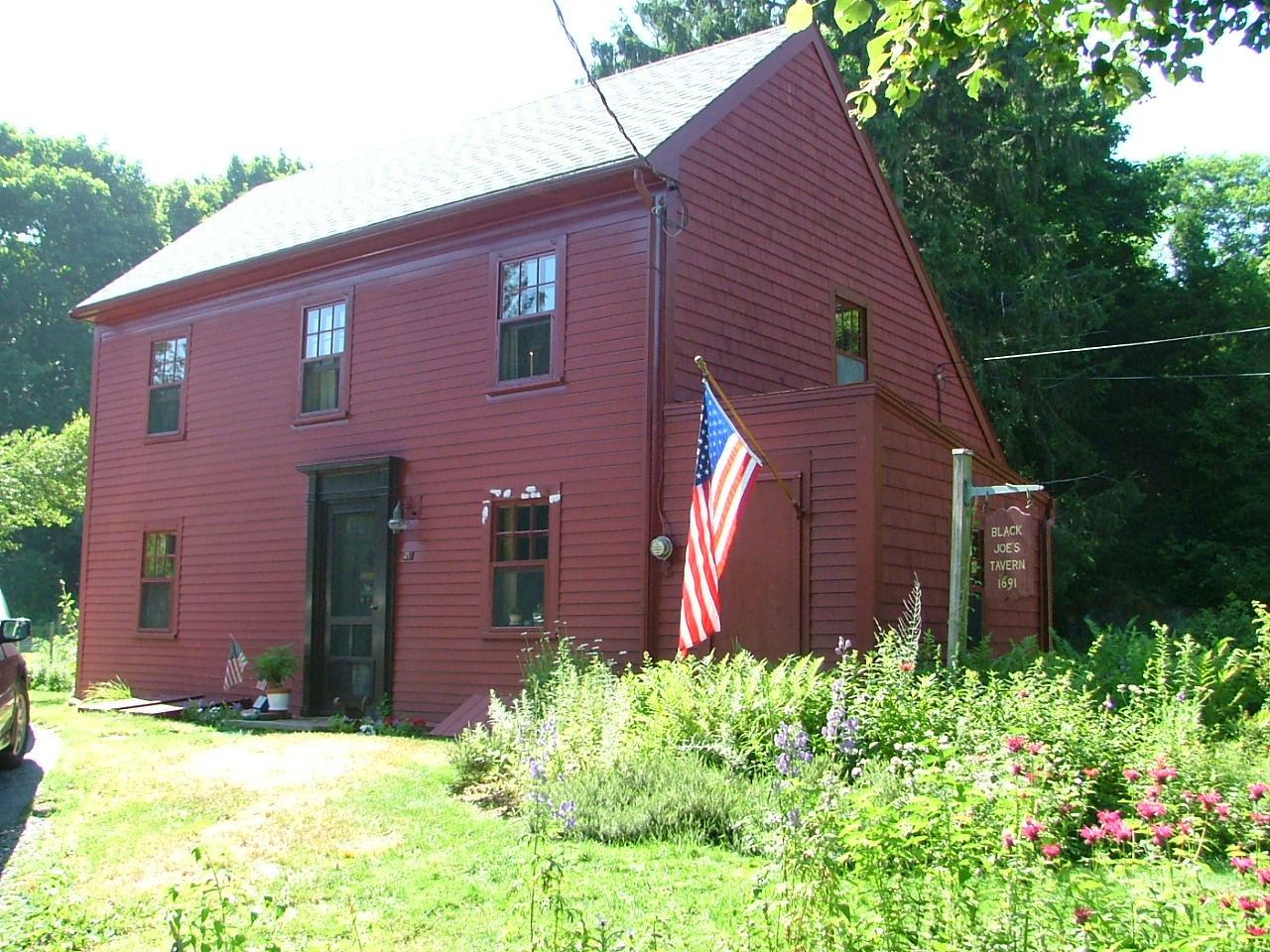
Black Joe's Tavern (built 1691), home of the Joe Frogger cookie.

Joe Froggers are named for Joseph Brown (1750-1834), the keeper of Black Joe's Tavern in Marblehead, Massachusetts. The cookies were invented by Brown's wife, Lucretia Thomas Brown (1772-1857), who worked at the tavern.

Joseph Brown was a freed former slave, born to an African-American mother and a Wampanoag father. He may have been freed as a reward for his military service in the American Revolutionary War; he was a member of Francis Felton's company, Glover's Regiment. Lucretia Brown, nicknamed "Aunt 'Crese," was the daughter of two former slaves of Captain Samuel Tucker. In 1795, Joseph and Lucretia Brown went in with another couple on the purchase of a saltbox house at the top of Gingerbread Hill in Marblehead, next to a mill pond. Eventually they bought out the other couple. The house was both their residence and the site of their tavern. Black Joe's Tavern was known as a racially integrated gathering place for hard-drinking fishermen.

There are many different stories about how the cookies came to be called Froggers. According to some sources, they were named for the froglike shape the batter would form when it hit the hot iron skillet. According to others, they were named for the frogs in the nearby mill pond. The name may be a misspelling or a play on "Joe Floggers," which were a kind of pancake, also used as a ship's provision.

The town of Marblehead erected a memorial to Joseph Brown on Old Burial Hill in 1976 to mark the American Bicentennial. Black Joe's Pond in Marblehead is named for him, and a nearby wooded area was named the Joseph Brown Conservation Area in 1973. The tavern, built in 1691, is still standing; it is currently in use as a private residence.

== Recipe ==
There are many different recipes for Joe Froggers available online and in cookbooks. Lucretia Thomas Brown's original recipe has been lost. A recipe for "Tavern Cookies" published by Mary Randolph in 1824 may be a more expensive version of Brown's creation; it calls for sugar instead of molasses, and wine or brandy instead of rum.

As a tribute to their unique history, Joe Froggers are sold in the cafeteria of the National Museum of African American History and Culture. They are also sold in the Old Sturbridge Village bakeshop.

== See also ==
- Gingerbread
- Ginger snap
- List of cookies
