= Elizabeth Hubbard (Salem witch trials) =

Accuser in the Salem witch trials

- Born: ca. 1674 or 1675; Massachusetts Bay Colony
- Died: Unknown
- Known for: First accuser in the Salem witch trials who was of legal age to testify

Elizabeth Hubbard was an American woman who is best known as the primary instigator of the Salem Witch Trials. Hubbard was 17 years old in the spring of 1692 when the trials began. In the 15 months the trials took place, twenty people were executed.

== Early life ==
Elizabeth Hubbard was born in Massachusetts Bay Colony in 1674. Hubbard was an orphan who lived with her uncle, Dr. William Griggs. She served as his maidservant.

== Involvement in Salem Witch Trials ==
A group of girls ranging in age from 9 to 17 were the main accusers in the Salem witch trials. This group, of which Elizabeth Hubbard was a part, also included Ann Putnam, Mary Walcott, Elizabeth “Betty” Parris, Abigail Williams, Elizabeth Booth, Mercy Lewis, and Mary Warren.

Abigail Williams and Betty Parris were the first to experience mysterious "fits", of which symptoms included throwing of objects, screaming, and contortion of the body. Dr. Griggs, acting as town physician, concluded that the source of the girls' behavior was supernatural. As Elizabeth Hubbard was the maidservant of Griggs, it is likely that she was intimately aware of the symptoms involved in the fits. Hubbard had her first recorded fit on February 1, 1692.

Hubbard's age allowed her to testify under oath, leading her to have a major role in the trials. Her testimony was considered especially convincing, and she was known for being particularly susceptible to being thrown into fits during trials. During Elizabeth Proctor's trial, Hubbard purported to be under a deep trance and unable to speak:

"I saw the apparition of Sarah Good, which did torture me most grievously, but I did not know her name until the 27th of February, and then she told me her name was Sarah Good, and then she did prick me and pinch me most grievously, and also since, several times, urging me vehemently to write in her [devil’s] book”

As the trials progressed, Hubbard began instigating more and more accusations. She gave her last testimony on January 7, 1693. Records show that she filed 40 legal complaints and testified 32 times. As a result of her testimonies, 17 people were arrested, 13 were hanged, and two died in jail.

== Life after trials ==
It is unclear what happened to Hubbard after the trials concluded. American historian Mary Beth Norton states in her book In the Devil’s Snare: The Salem Witchcraft Crisis of 1692 that Hubbard moved from Salem to Gloucester in Massachusetts. Norton purports that Hubbard married a man named John Bennett, with whom she had four children. Norton cites a published marriage record of a woman named Elizabeth Hibbert, but it is not known with certainty that Elizabeth Hibbert was Elizabeth Hubbard.
