= Redd's Pond =

Lake of the United States

- Location within Massachusetts
- Location: Essex County, Massachusetts
- Coordinates: 42°30′36″N 70°50′51″W
- Type: pond

Redd's Pond is located in Marblehead, Massachusetts. It was named after Wilmot Redd.

== Salem Witchcraft Trials ==
In 1692, in Salem Village (now Danvers), several hysterical girls were said to have been "afflicted" by witchcraft. Among those accused was Wilmot Redd, a crusty old woman, who was not popular with the womenfolk. Married to fisherman Samuel Redd, local fisherman knew her as “Mammy Red.”

A warrant for her arrest was issued in Salem, signed by Magistrates Jonathan Corwin and John Hathorne. On May 31, Wilmot was taken to Salem Village for a preliminary examination. She was indicted and then placed in the Salem jail.

Four months later, the trial was held in Salem Towne. Although she denied the charges, she was allowed no defense counsel. On September 17, she was condemned to hang. Four days later, she and seven others were executed in Salem, either on Gallows Hill or a nearby hill.

Wilmot Redd was the only Marblehead citizen executed for witchcraft. Her small house was next to Old Burial Hill, on the southeast corner of the pond that now bears her name.
