= Nathaniel Thomas (Massachusetts judge) =

English colonial magistrate, politician, and militia officer

Nathaniel Thomas (1643 - 22 October 1718) was an English colonial magistrate, politician, and militia officer. Born in Marshfield, then in the Plymouth Colony, he represented the town in the colonial assembly during the 1670s, and was active in its militia during King Philip's War. In 1689, he served as clerk of the local court, and, following the combining of Plymouth and the Massachusetts Bay Colony into the Province of Massachusetts Bay, from 1702 to 1707 he was a Plymouth County probate judge. From 1692 to 1712 he also served as a magistrate in the court of common pleas. In 1712, he was appointed to the Massachusetts Superior Court of Judicature (the province's highest court), a position he held until his death in 1718.

He was twice married, with nine children by his first wife.

Legal offices
Preceded by John Hathorne	Associate Justice of the Massachusetts Superior Court of Judicature; 1712-1718	Succeeded by Edmund Quincy
