= Wilmot Redd =

Salem witch

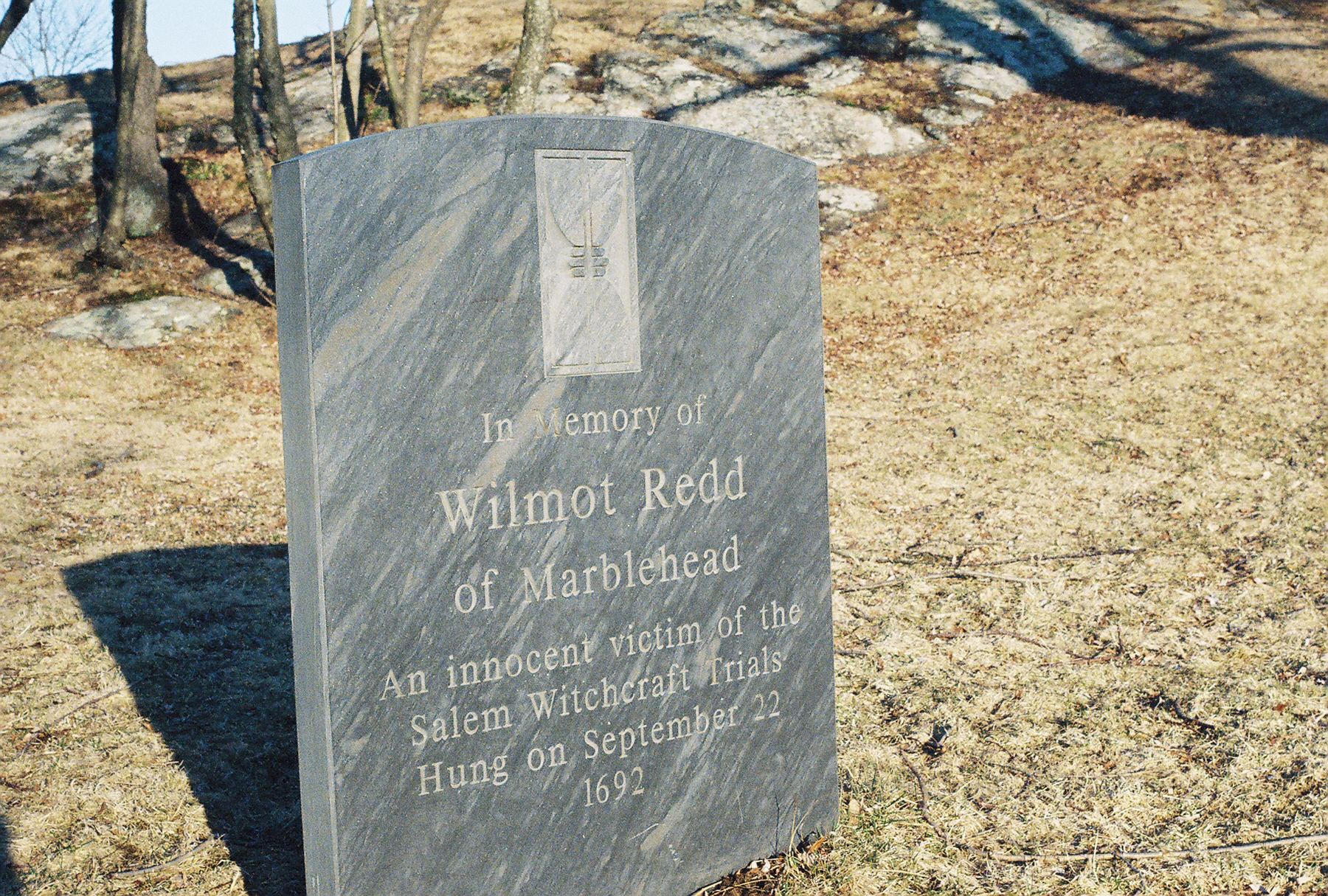
- A memorial marker found at Old Burial Hill in Marblehead, near Redd's Pond
- Born: early 17th century Marblehead, Massachusetts
- Died: September 22, 1692; Salem Village, Province of Massachusetts Bay
- Cause of death: Execution by hanging
- Known for: Convicted of witchcraft in the Salem witch trials

Wilmot Redd (a.k.a. Wilmot Read and Wilmot Reed) (early 17th century – September 22, 1692) was one of the victims of the Salem witch trials of 1692. She was born in Marblehead, Massachusetts, and executed by hanging on September 22, 1692. Her husband was Samuel Redd, a fisherman. She was known for her irritability, but she was given little serious attention.

== Trial ==
Redd was apprehended on May 28, 1692, by local constable James Smith. The warrant was signed by Magistrates Jonathan Corwin and John Hathorne. The charge brought against her was one of having "committed sundry acts of witchcraft on bodys of Mary Walcott & Mercy Lewis and others in Salem Village to their great hurt."

A preliminary examination took place on May 31, 1692, at Nathan Ingersoll's house in Salem Village. This was Redd's first meeting with the children she allegedly bewitched. They promptly fell into fits, and when asked what she thought ailed them, Redd said, "I cannot tell." Urged to give an opinion, she stated, "My opinion is they are in a sad condition."

Indicted as a witch, Redd was accused of "detestable arts called Witchcraft and Sorceries wickedly, mallitiously [sic] and felloniously used, practiced & exercised at the Towne of Salem."

== Death and legacy ==
Redd's body was buried in a common grave whose location is now unknown. Memorial markers for her exist at Old Burial Hill in Marblehead - which late Marblehead resident, town historian and "The Spirit of 76 Lives Here" author Virginia Gamage purchased - and in the garden of the King Hooper Mansion at 8 Hooper Street in Marblehead and the Salem Witch Trials Memorial in Salem. In addition, the town has named the pond her home was adjacent to, "Redd's Pond".
