= Robert Breuler =

American stage actor

Robert Breuler is an American stage actor, primarily known as a longtime ensemble member of the Steppenwolf Theatre Company, in Chicago, Illinois, where he won a Joseph Jefferson Award for his role as a Russian negotiator in A Walk in the Woods.

Breuler has appeared in over 40 shows at Steppenwolf. He has also appeared on Broadway and on screen, most notably as Judge John Hathorne in The Crucible.
