= Benjamin Abbot House =

Historic house in Massachusetts, United States

- U.S. National Register of Historic Places
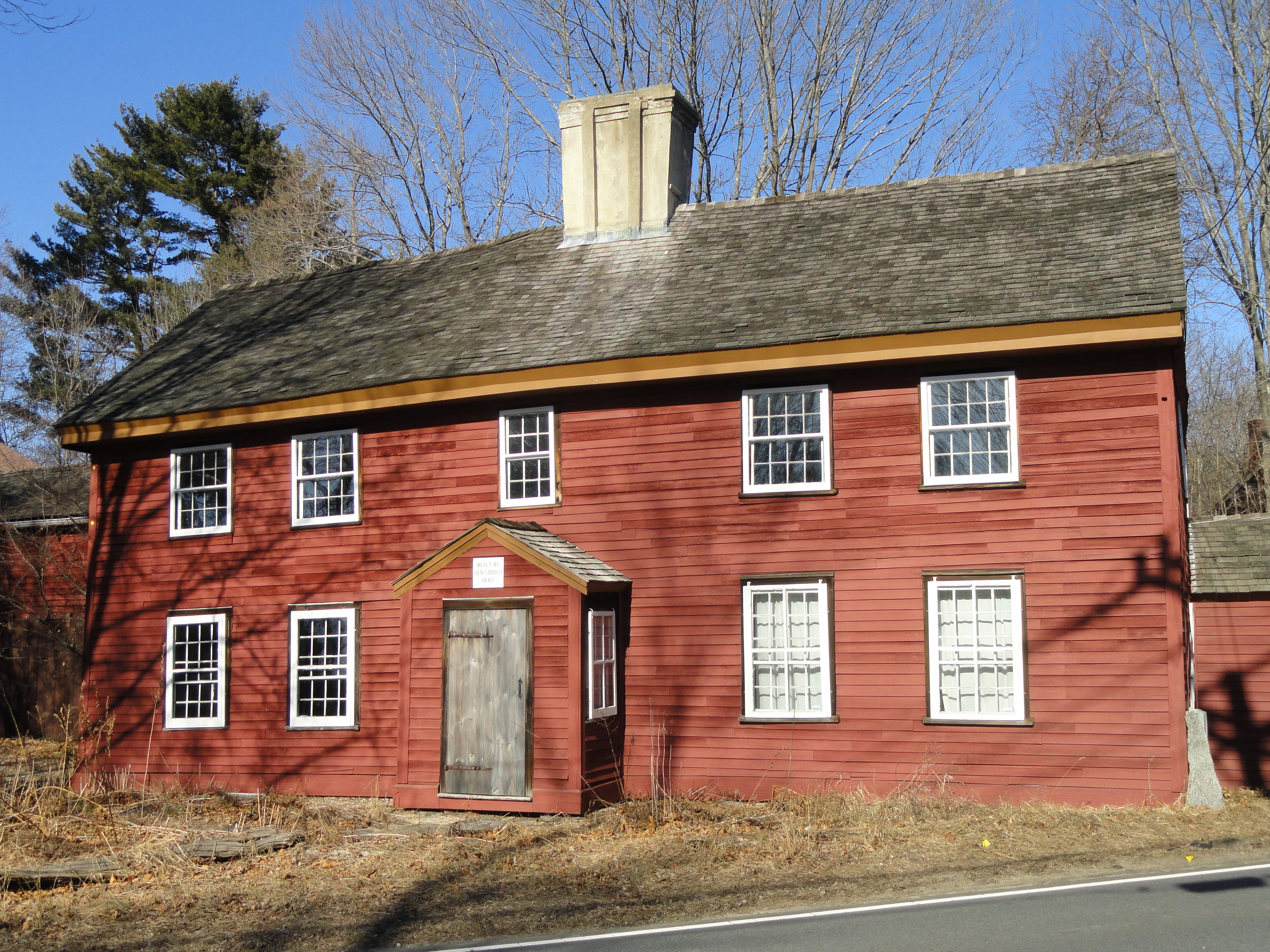

- Location within Massachusetts Location within the United States
- Location: 9 Andover St., Andover, Massachusetts
- Coordinates: 42°38′47″N 71°9′11″W
- Built: 1711
- NRHP reference No.: 75000242
- Added to NRHP: February 24, 1975

The Benjamin Abbot House or Abbot Homestead is a historic house at 9 Andover Street in Andover, Massachusetts, USA. The house was built in 1711. It was listed on the National Register of Historic Places in 1975.

== Description and history ==
The Benjamin Abbot House is a located southwest of downtown Andover, on the north side of Andover Street, a busy road connecting the center to Interstate 93. The house faces south, and its southeast corner is quite close to the road. The main block is a 2 1/2-story wood-frame structure, with a gabled roof, central chimney, and clapboarded exterior. A recessed ell extends to the west, joining the house to a barn that serves as a garage. The main block is five bays wide, with 8-over-8 sash windows in the outer bays, and a 6-over-6 sash above the center entrance. The entrance is in a projecting gabled vestibule with small windows on the sides; the door is made of vertical planking attached with iron strap hinges. The interior features exposed main beams (some 15 inches (38 cm) thick, and many period features.

The house was featured on the PBS program History Detectives in 2004. As part of the investigation, Oxford Dendrochronology Lab determined that the eastern (right) side of the house was built in 1711, and the western portion, to the left of the entryway, was built in 1713.

The house was long thought to date to 1685 (which is mounted on a plaque above the door), and is named for Benjamin Abbot, a carpenter by trade and the son of an early settler of Andover. In 1692 Abbot accused Martha Carrier of witchcraft, alleging that she caused his foot to swell, and that his foot healed after her arrest. Benjamin Abbot died in 1703 and, therefore, did not live in this building. The house was owned by generations of the Abbot family until 1933. In 1950 it was offered to the local historical society, which refused to offer on the grounds they could not afford to maintain it properly.

== See also ==
- National Register of Historic Places listings in Andover, Massachusetts
- National Register of Historic Places listings in Essex County, Massachusetts
- List of the oldest buildings in Massachusetts
