= Deliverance Dane =

Deliverance Dane (née Hazeltine; January 15, 1653 – June 15, 1735) was one of many women accused of witchcraft (Note: The Salem witchcraft papers, Volume 1: verbatim transcripts of the legal documents of the Salem witchcraft outbreak of 1692.) (Note: Salem Witch Trials.) during the Salem Witch Trials. She was the daughter of Robert and Anna Hazeltine. Dane was from Andover, Massachusetts, and due largely to the work of her father-in-law, much of the hysteria that swept through Salem was halted in Andover.

Her husband, Nathaniel Dane, was the son of Rev. Francis Dane. (Note: Historical sketches of Andover: (comprising the present towns of North Andover and Andover).) After her arrest, Deliverance was in prison for 13 weeks.

Francis Dane was outspoken against the trials, and his two daughters Abigail Faulkner and Elizabeth Johnson were also accused of being witches. Abigail was convicted of witchcraft, but only escaped execution because she was pregnant at the time.

Many of the records of Deliverance's examination have been lost, but on page 280 of Marilynne K. Roach's book The Salem Witch Trials: A Day-by-Day Chronicle of a Community Under Siege, she quotes Deliverance as saying that she and some other witches had brought her father-in-law's specter along with them to torment the afflicted. Her testimony was ignored and Rev. Francis Dane was not arrested. Deliverance Dane escaped execution. According to Andover, Massachusetts, records, she died on June 15, 1735.

== Sources ==
- Roach, Marilynne K. (2004). The Salem witch trials: a day-by-day chronicle of a community under siege. Taylor Trade Publications. ISBN 978-1-58979-132-9.
