= Sarah (Aslett) Cole =

American colonist

Sarah Cole
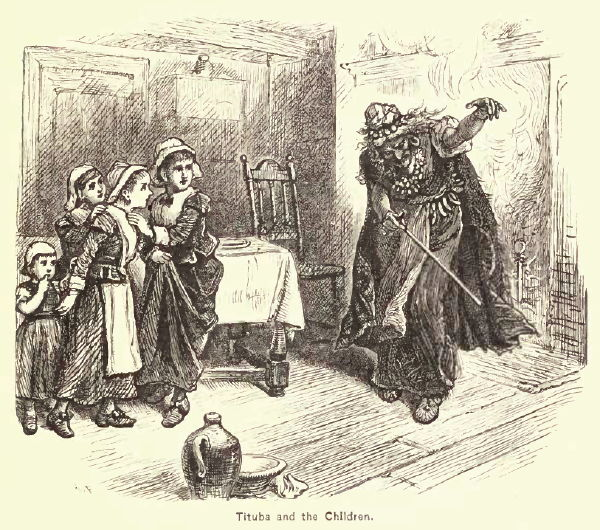
- Representation of "Tituba and the Children"
- Born: 1661; Andover, Massachusetts
- Died: 1740 (aged 78–79)
- Known for: Accused of witchcraft in the Salem witch trials
- Spouse: John Cole
- Children: Samuel Cole and Anna (Cole) Runels

Sarah Cole was born in 1661 and was one of the accused in the Salem witch trials. She grew up in Andover, Massachusetts, as the seventh of eight children of John Aslet and Rebecca (Ayer) Aslet. She married John Cole of Lynn, Massachusetts, before 1685 and had two children born in 1687 and 1690.

== Accusations ==
On 1 October 1692 Sarah was accused of witchcraft by the widow Mary Brown of Reading, Massachusetts. Mary claimed to be suffering pain from an illness she attributed to Sarah Cole. Mary claimed Sarah was appearing as a specter in September bringing her pain and trying to ruin her family. Mary said she and her children had heard the sounds of stones being thrown against their house and creatures like cats crying on the roof of their house. Sarah was arrested and imprisoned on 3 October.

On 3 October Sarah's husband John Cole said their house had been troubled by dogs and cats running by and he thought he had seen a ball of fire. John said his Monday night prayer was interrupted when he heard a great thing flung against his house and that thing hit him on the head and side beating the breath out of his body. John said it took him several minutes to recover enough to resume his prayer, but his wife had said she observed no interruption of his prayer. A week later John said he saw at his door a great cat of unusual bigness staring at his face. John said it was a calm night, but when the cat left, it was like a hurricane blew over the stalks of grass the cat passed as it left. John said he thought his children were bewitched, and his head and belly had been sorely molested in the dead of night, so he had not slept at home for the past three nights.

Also on 3 October Elizabeth Wellman said she observed Sarah Cole in the woods in August. Elizabeth said she saw a black thing of considerable bigness appear when Sarah threw her skirt over her head, but the black thing soon disappeared, and then Sarah disappeared after clasping her hands together and waving them twice over her head.

Also on 3 October Mary Eaton said Sarah Cole told her Mary's cow was bewitched. Sarah said she saw something on the cow, but when Sarah and Mary's daughter went to the barn they found nothing on the cow but heard a great noise from the scaffold of the barn.

On 11 January 1693 John Brown said he had spoken with Sarah Cole the preceding August. Sarah told John all church members were devils and her husband would be a devil if he joined the church. John said he told Sarah she should be careful about saying such things. John said Sarah then stared at him silently and he became ill shortly thereafter. John said about a fortnight later he and Elizabeth Wellman's husband Abraham made an Indian pudding of white hog suet and flour, and he blamed Sarah Cole when the pudding turned red like a blood pudding.

Also on 11 January Abraham Wellman said he had a cow which he thought was desired by Sarah Cole. Abraham said the cow had always been gentle, but when Sarah Cole came near the cow became wild and would run whenever anyone tried to milk her. He said the cow stayed wild until Sarah left for another town.

Also on 11 January Abraham Wellman's brother Isaac said he had often heard Sarah Cole wish harm to her husband, and once that she would wish her husband dead if he again visited the home of Mary Eaton's husband Daniel.

== Result ==
Sarah was tried in Charleston, Massachusetts, on 1 February 1693 and acquitted. Her husband died on 8 October 1703, and she died on 2 January 1740.
