= Susannah Sheldon =

17th-century witch accuser

Susannah Sheldon (born circa 1674) was one of the core accusers during the Salem Witch Trials. She was eighteen years of age during the time of Salem witch trials. As one of the core group of allegedly afflicted girls, Sheldon made claims of afflictions for the first time during the last week of April 1692.

== Biography ==
Sheldon was the daughter of Rebecca Scadlock and William Sheldon. When Sheldon was a baby, her family was driven out of their home in Saco, Maine by Native Americans during King Philip's War in 1676. The family lived in Salem, Massachusetts during King Philip's War but returned to Saco when peace was established. The family fled Saco once again during King William's War and returned to Salem.

Sheldon's elder brother Godfrey died in Maine in July 1690 and her father William died in Salem in December 1691. Having lost their Maine farm, the Sheldon family lived in poverty in Salem after 1691.

In April 1692, Sheldon was eighteen years old when she became one of the main accusers in the Salem Witch Trials. Records show that Sheldon testified against eleven witches and filed at least 24 depositions. Sheldon was personally responsible for bringing witchcraft accusations against Salem's wealthiest and most prominent couples, Mary and Philip English. This was Sheldon's first accusation.

According to historian Mary Beth Norton, Sheldon likely died unmarried and childless.
