= Mary Walcott =

Witness at the Salem witch trials (born 1675)

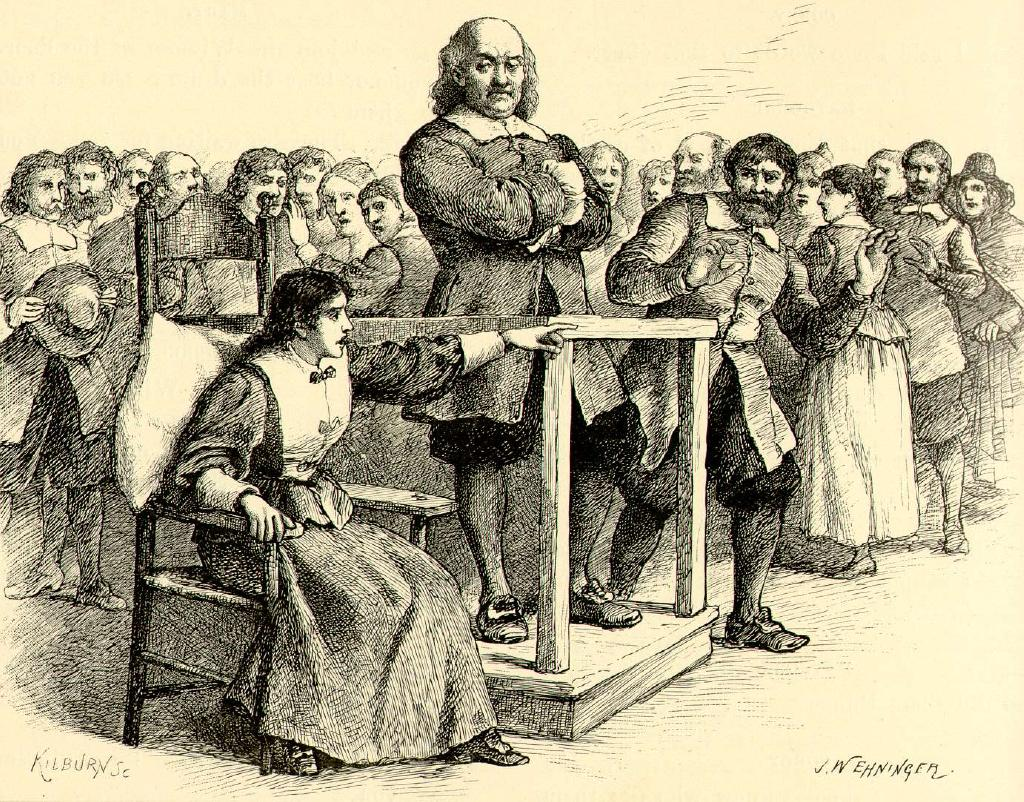
Walcott at the Salem witch trials

Mary Walcott (July 5, 1675 – c. 1752) was an accuser at the Salem witch trials in early 1692-93.

== Life ==
Born July 5, 1675, she was the daughter of Captain Jonathan Walcott (1639–1699), and his wife, Mary Sibley (or Sibly; 1644–1683), both of Salem. Her mother died when she was eight years old and her father married Deliverance Putnam (1656-1699). Her halfsister Anne Walcott Felt (1685-1736) was born two years later.

Mary was about seventeen years old when the allegations started in 1692. Her aunt, Mary (née Wolcott), the wife of Samuel Sibley (or Sibly; 1657–1708), was the person who first showed Tituba and Tituba's husband John Indian how to bake a "witch cake" to feed to a dog in order that she and her friends might ascertain exactly who it was that was afflicting them. Joseph B. Felt quoted in The Annals of Salem (1849 edition) vol. 2, p. 476 [from the town records]:

March 11, 1692 – "Mary, the wife of Samuel Sibley, having been suspended from communion with the church there, for the advices she gave John [husband of Tituba] to make the above experiment, is restored on confession that her purpose was innocent."

== Marriage ==
Mary Walcott married Isaac Farrar, son of John Farrar of Woburn, Massachusetts, on April 28, 1696. They had several children, and eventually moved to Townsend, Massachusetts. She married, secondly, to David Harwood in 1701 in Sutton, Massachusetts. They had nine children:

1. Mary Harwood, b. Abt. 1702.; d. Abt. 1753.
2. Emma Harwood, b. Abt. 1705. (m. Ebenezer Macintyre, May 23, 1728).
3. Hannah Harwood, b. Abt. 1706; (m. Ebenezer Twiss, Abt. 1752).
4. David Harwood, b. Abt. 1708, Salem, Essex County, Massachusetts; d. August 22, 1781, Sutton, Worcester County, Massachusetts; (m. Margaret Cox, March 13, 1730/31, Salem, Essex Cnty, Massachusetts).
5. Elizabeth Harwood, b. Abt. 1711; d. Abt. 1738; (m. Benjamin Moulton, October 1734).
6. Ezra Harwood, b. Abt. 1715.
7. Alice Harwood, b. Abt. 1720, Salem, Massachusetts (m. Jonathan Nourse Jr., August 12, 1743).
8. Absalom Harwood, b. Abt. 1723; (m. Anna Boyce, September 23, 1748).
9. Solomon Harwood, b. Abt. 1725; (m. Abagail Phelps, December 20, 1748; m. Sarah Taylor December 4, 1752).

== Later years ==
They moved to Sutton about 1729, leaving most of their children living in Salem. David was a weaver by occupation. David died before 1744. Mary Walcott Harwood probably died before 1752.

== Sources ==
- Perley, Sidney (1928). The History of Salem Massachusetts. Vol. 1–3. Higginson Book Company. ISBN 9780740460319. Archived from the original on 2012-05-09.
- Essex Institute (1927). Vital Records of Salem Massachusetts. Vol. 1–6. ISBN 1153428784.
- Sanborn, Melinde Lutz (1987). Essex County Massachusetts Probate Records, 1630–1840. Vol. 1–2. M.L. Sanborn. ISBN 0961871105.
- Sawtelle, Ithamar B., ed. (1878). History of the Town of Townsend, Middlesex County, Massachusetts: 1676–1878. ISBN 978-1112145001.
- Hallowell, Henry C. (1992). Vital Records of Townsend, Massachusetts. New England Historic Genealogical Society. ISBN 9780880820301.
- Stearns, Ezra S., ed. (1908). Genealogical and Family History of the State of New Hampshire. Vol. II. Рипол Классик. p. 591. ISBN 9781462261413.
