= John Hathorne =

Merchant and magistrate (1641–1717)

Justice of the Salem witch trials
- In office May 1692 – June 1692

Associate Justice of the Massachusetts Superior Court of Judicature
- In office 1702–1712

Personal details
- Born: Baptized August 2, 1641 Salem, Massachusetts Bay Colony, British America
- Died: May 10, 1717 (aged 75) Salem, Province of Massachusetts Bay, British America

John Hathorne (August 1641 – May 10, 1717) was a merchant and magistrate of the Massachusetts Bay Colony and Salem, Massachusetts. He is best known for his early and vocal role as one of the leading judges in the Salem witch trials.

Hathorne was absent from the list of men appointed to the Court of Oyer & Terminer in June 1692. That court relied heavily on the spectral evidence, examinations, interrogations, and affidavits previously conducted by Hathorne, co-signed by Jonathan Corwin, and recorded by Rev. Samuel Parris and/or Ezekiel Cheever Jr. On September 22, 1692, the date of the final eight executions, Hathorne was present at a meeting (Sewall Diary) with Stoughton and Cotton Mather to discuss using court records in a new publication designed to promote the trials. Unlike Samuel Sewall, Hathorne is not known to have repented for his actions. He was a patrilineal ancestor of writer Nathaniel Hawthorne.

== Life ==
Hathorne's father, Major William Hathorne, was among the early settlers of the Massachusetts Bay Colony in the 1630s and held a number of military and political positions for several decades. John was born in Salem in August 1641; his father's surviving records give the date as August 4, but the records of the First Church of Salem indicate he was baptized on August 2. John married in Salem, March 22, 1674/5, Ruth Gardner, granddaughter of "Old Planter" Thomas Gardner, a settler of Salem who arrived as part of colonization efforts funded by the Dorchester Company in 1625.

Hathorne expanded on the successes of his father in building a small empire based on land and merchant trade to England and the West Indies. In addition to lands in the Salem area he also had interests in the lands of what is now Maine. He assumed positions of authority in the town, and was appointed a justice of the peace of Essex County, and served as a member of the colony's council of assistants (a combination of legislative upper house and high court). In this role he was called on to mediate disputes in the county's towns, including Salem Village (present-day Danvers).

=== Salem interrogations and trials ===
When in early 1692 accusations of witchcraft began to circulate in Salem Village, Hathorne and magistrate Jonathan Corwin were called upon to question both accusers and accused to determine if there was cause for a trial; they were eventually joined in this task by officials from Boston, including Deputy Governor Thomas Danforth. Hathorne's questioning of a number of individuals was characterized at the time as somewhat harsh. Historical and fictional accounts of the trials often depict him as convinced that the accused were guilty. He is noted for his questioning of Rebecca Nurse and Bridget Bishop:

Bishop : I am no witch
Hathorne : Why if you have not wrote in the book, yet tell me how far you have gone?
Bishop : I have no familiarity with the devil.
Hathorne : How is it then, that your appearance doth hurt these?
Bishop : I am innocent.
Hathorne : Why you seem to act witchcraft before us by the motion of your body which seems to have influence upon the afflicted.
Bishop : I know nothing of it. I am innocent to a witch. I know not what a witch is.
Hathorne : How do you know then that you are not a witch?
Bishop : I do not know what you say.
Hathorne : How can you know, you are no witch, and yet not know what a witch is?
Bishop : I am clear...
--Records of Salem witchcraft, copied from the original documents by Woodward, William Eliot, 1864

When the Special Court of Oyer and Terminer was established in May 1692, Governor Sir William Phips did not appoint Hathorne to the panel, which was headed by Lieutenant Governor William Stoughton. This panel heard trials in which 19 were convicted and executed for witchcraft. The special court was replaced in 1693 by the Superior Court of Judicature, on which Hathorne was not immediately seated; it cleared most of the accused it tried of any wrongdoing, and the few convictions it handed down were vacated by Governor Phips.

== Later years ==
Later in the 1690s Hathorne followed in his father's military footsteps and became more involved in the colonial military activities of King William's War, leading forces in the 1696 Siege of Fort Nashwaak (present-day Fredericton, New Brunswick). He continued to be active in the colonial militia, and was promoted to colonel in 1711. He was also finally appointed to the Superior Court by Governor Joseph Dudley, a seat he held until 1711. He died in Salem in 1717, and is interred in the Old Burying Point Cemetery along with a number of his descendants.

The inscription on his tombstone reads: “Here lyes interd ye body of Colo John Hathorne Esqr Aged 76 years Who Died May ye 10th 1717.” The tombstone has been placed in a granite block to help preserve it.

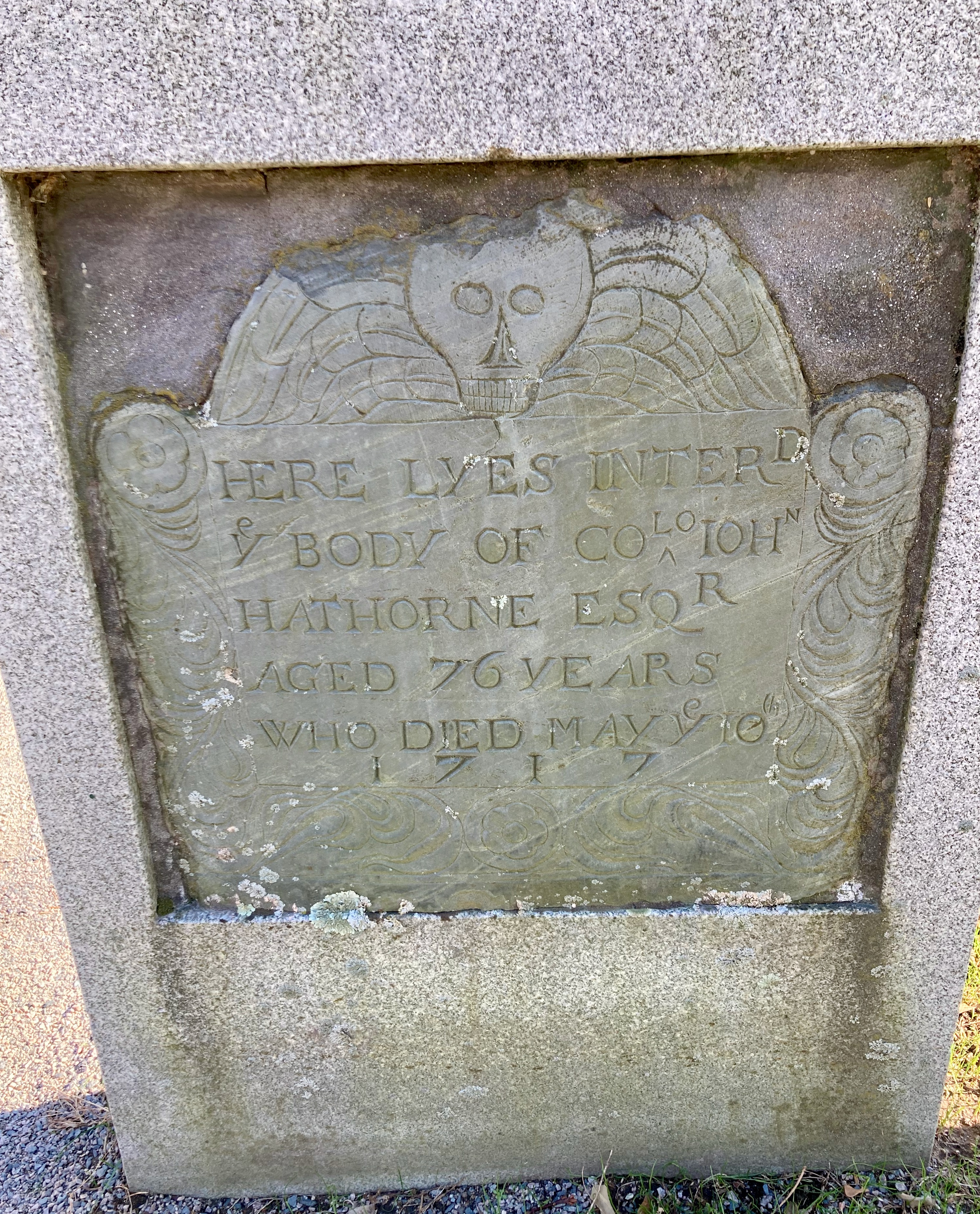
Hathorne's tombstone at Old Burying Point / Charter Street Cemetery.

== Nathaniel Hawthorne ==
John was the great-great-grandfather of Nathaniel Hawthorne (born "Hathorne"), author of many works, including The Scarlet Letter and The House of the Seven Gables. The latter work, set in Salem, contains allusions to the witch trials in its history of the house. Hawthorne was somewhat distressed and deeply ashamed at his ancestor's lack of remorse over the trials. Nathaniel may have adopted the "Hawthorne" spelling in an effort to dissociate himself from the judge.

== In popular culture ==
Hathorne is featured in Arthur Miller's play The Crucible (and its film adaptations). Robert Breuler portrays him in The Crucible (1996 film).

Hathorne is the judge appointed by Mr. Scratch at the trial in Stephen Vincent Benét's story "The Devil and Daniel Webster", where he is described as "a tall man, soberly clad in Puritan garb, with the burning gaze of the fanatic." In the 1941 film version, he was portrayed by H.B. Warner. In Henry Wadsworth Longfellow's play Giles Corey of the Salem Farms, Hathorne is shown debating Cotton Mather on the nature of witchcraft and presiding over hearings in which Giles Corey refuses to enter a plea (in both the real trial and Longfellow's work, Corey was crushed to death for this refusal).

The horror film The Lords of Salem features a witch-hunting reverend named John Hawthorne.

Hathorne is featured in Alice Hoffman's book Magic Lessons (prequel to Practical Magic), where the protagonist Maria Owens first meets him in Curaçao, West Indies and later in Salem, Massachusetts.

In the upcoming video game Deadlock, the character Vindicta was killed in the Salem Witch Trials by Hathorne and returns years later as a ghost to wipe out Hathorne's bloodline.

Legal offices
Preceded by John Saffin	Associate Justice of the Massachusetts Superior Court of Judicature; 1702-1712	Succeeded by Nathaniel Thomas
