= Cry Innocent =

Theatrical performance

Cry Innocent is a theatrical performance based on an episode of the Salem witch trials. The show, which has been running continuously since the mid-1990s, emphasizes interactive theater. The stage is set in 1692. Bridget Bishop has been accused of witchcraft and the audience sits on the Puritan jury. They hear the accounts, cross-examine the witnesses and decide the verdict. The actors respond in character to all comments and questions, revealing additional information about the early Colonial era of American history.

The show takes place at Salem Old Town Hall, but the first scene of the performance, the arrest of Bridget Bishop, is reenacted on the streets of Salem. Backed by academic research, while offering an entertaining way to interact with characters from the past, Cry Innocent is among the few tourist attractions in Salem, Massachusetts, that strive to accurately present the Salem witch trials. "The script uses original dialogue and testimony, as recorded in court documents of 1692." The show made many TV appearances, including a 2010 episode of What Not to Wear.
