= Thomas Oliver (Salem witch trials) =

Massachusetts Bay colonist (c. 1601–1679)

Thomas Oliver (c. 1601 England—June 1679 Salem, Province of Massachusetts Bay) was the second husband of Bridget Bishop, who on 10 June 1692 became the first victim of the Salem witch trials. He is a major link in the old and well-known theory that his widow, Bridget Bishop, was executed on trumped up charges because her in-laws were jealous of what she had inherited from him. Upham's History of the Salem Witchcraft Trials makes clear that her marriage to Thomas Oliver is a determining factor in the witchcraft prosecution of Bridget Oliver Bishop.

== First marriage: Mary Leman ==
Oliver married Mary Leman on 29 Jan 1626 in Norwich, Norfolk, England. They originally immigrated to Boston, with 2 children and 2 servants, on the "Mary Anne" in 1637. At that time Thomas Oliver's profession was calender. They moved to Salem where he accumulated property which he left there when they returned to England.

Mary's constant and unpleasant public comments (especially her support of Roger Williams) caused her to be punished as early as 1638. Thomas Oliver's inability or perhaps unwillingness to control her caused them to be exiled from the Colony and return to England c. 1649.

They had at least three sons and, according to Upham, at least three daughters. One daughter married a constable—who may have caused Bridget Oliver Bishop to be brought up on charges of witchcraft.

== Second marriage: Bridget (Playfer) Wasselbe ==
Oliver married Bridget (Playfer) Wasselbe, widow of Capt. Samuel Wasselbe, 26 July 1666; they had a daughter Christian in 1667

After his death she was brought up on charges of witching him to death (this was not the first time she was accused of witchcraft, but it was perhaps the first time she was put on trial). This time she was acquitted. However this seems to have set her up for the second charge in 1692 as the result of which she was hanged.

== Estate ==
When he left the colony for England he had a considerable amount of real property to which he returned after his first wife Mary's death. His estate included a house and sometime tavern in Salem, Massachusetts near the meeting house where after his death his widow Bridget Oliver Bishop was known for staying up late into the night entertaining her guests with playing shovelboard. During the scholarly reexaminations of the Salem witch trials during the 19th century, Bridget Bishop's claims on this estate were posited as the real reason for her being accused of witchcraft. In one of his books Upham makes clear that one of the police officials was married to one of her in-laws who had expressed jealousy of Bridget Oliver Bishop's having property near the meeting house at Salem.

== Family ==
One of his daughters married a constable. Further, the wife of one of the judges had a grandmother whose surname was Oliver.
