= Edward Bishop (Salem witch trials) =

Edward Bishop was involved in the witchcraft hysteria of 1692. Four men named Edward Bishop lived in Salem at the time of the trials. Most of the early genealogical works, such as those by Savage and Pope, were confused; and some stated as much.

== Relationships ==
Savage states that an Edward Bishop was living in Salem, Massachusetts as of 1639. Edward Bishop Sr. was born around 1620 in England. Edward Bishop Sr. married Hannah More. The reconstructed vital records of Salem Massachusetts lists baptisms for 3 children of Edward Bishop Sr. (by his first wife Hannah) between 1646 and 1651 at the First Church of Salem Massachusetts:

- Hanna Bishop 12 April 1646
- Edward Bishop (Jr.) 23 April 1648
- Mary Bishop 12 October 1651

An Edward Bishop was one of the founders of the First Church of Beverly (Massachusetts Bay Colony) in 1667. Edward Bishop Jr. and his wife, Sarah (née Wildes), were accused of witchcraft and imprisoned in the spring of 1692. They were transferred to the Boston jail, and escaped in October of that same year. Edward Bishop Jr. and Sarah Bishop had a number of children, including Edward Bishop III. Edward Bishop III eventually married Susannah Putnam, a relation of the Putnam family who were the main accusers in the witchcraft hysteria.

Edward Bishop, the sawyer, was perhaps not closely related to the other Edward Bishops. Edward Bishop, the sawyer, married Bridget Playfer. Bridget Bishop lived on Conant Street in Salem Town. Bridget Playfer had earlier married Samuel Wasselbe on April 13, 1660 at St Mary in the Marsh in Norwich. Samuel Wasselbe and Bridget had two children: A son named Benjamin whom Norwich parish registers list as baptized on October 6, and daughter Mary born in Boston. In the listing for Boston births for 1665, there is a listing for "Mary, of Samuel dec. and Bridget Wesselbee late of Norwich England born Jan.10" [1665].

It is unknown if Samuel died in England or accompanied Bridget to New England and died there, but her second marriage to Thomas Oliver (also from Norwich England) on July 26, 1666 was a troubled one. She had one child with Thomas, a daughter named Christian. After his death she was accused of bewitching her husband to death. Bridget was again accused of witchcraft in April 1692 and hanged in June of that year. That second arrest warrant still exists, referring to her as "wife of Edward Bishop, the sawyer". After the death of his wife Bridget, Edward married Elizabeth Cash on 9 March 1693.

Bridget Bishop and Sarah (Wildes) Bishop are often confused. Sarah (Wildes) Bishop and her stepmother Sarah (Averill) Wildes are also sometimes confused. It may have been Sarah (Wildes) Bishop, rather than Bridget, who ran an inn that served drinks to underaged patrons and allowed 'shovel'-board to be played at all hours of the night. Sarah Bishop owned and lived at an inn located in Salem Village, next door to Christian Trask. Trask confronted the Bishops about the late night revelry, and a few weeks later supposedly committed suicide by slashing her own throat with a pair of sewing scissors.

A petition in defense of Rebecca Nurse confirms that Edward Bishop Sr. could not have been the husband of Bridget Bishop. When Rebeccah Nurse was accused of witchcraft, a petition in her defense was signed by 39 of her neighbors, including Edward and Hannah Bishop (spelled Edward Besop Sr and Hana Besop on the petition). Since Hannah was able to sign the petition presented in a document at the trials, she was therefore still alive in 1692; and Edward Sr. could not have been married to Bridget at the same time. It is unlikely that the signature belonged to his daughter Hannah as she was then married and would have been known by her married name.
