= Abigail Hobbs =

American girl accused of witchcraft

- Born: c. 1675
- Known for: Victim of Salem Witch trials
- Parents: William Hobbs (father); Deliverance Hobbs (mother)

Abigail Hobbs was a girl of about 14-17 years old when she was arrested for witchcraft on April 18, 1692, along with Giles Corey, Mary Warren, and Bridget Bishop. Prior to living in Salem Village (now Danvers, Massachusetts), she and her family had lived in Falmouth, Maine, the frontier of the Massachusetts Bay Colony, during a time when there were many attacks by the Wabanaki Native Americans. Her father William and mother, Deliverance Hobbs, were also both charged with witchcraft.

During her multiple examinations by local magistrates between April and June 1692, Abigail confessed and accused others of witchcraft, including John Proctor. At her trial in September, she pleaded guilty to both indictments against her, one for afflicting Mercy Lewis and another for covenanting with the Devil. In her examination on April 20, 1692, Abigail Hobbs accused George Burroughs, the previous minister of Salem, of being a witch. With the naming of Minister Burroughs, a well-respected member of the community, many accusations came forth and climbed up the social hierarchy.

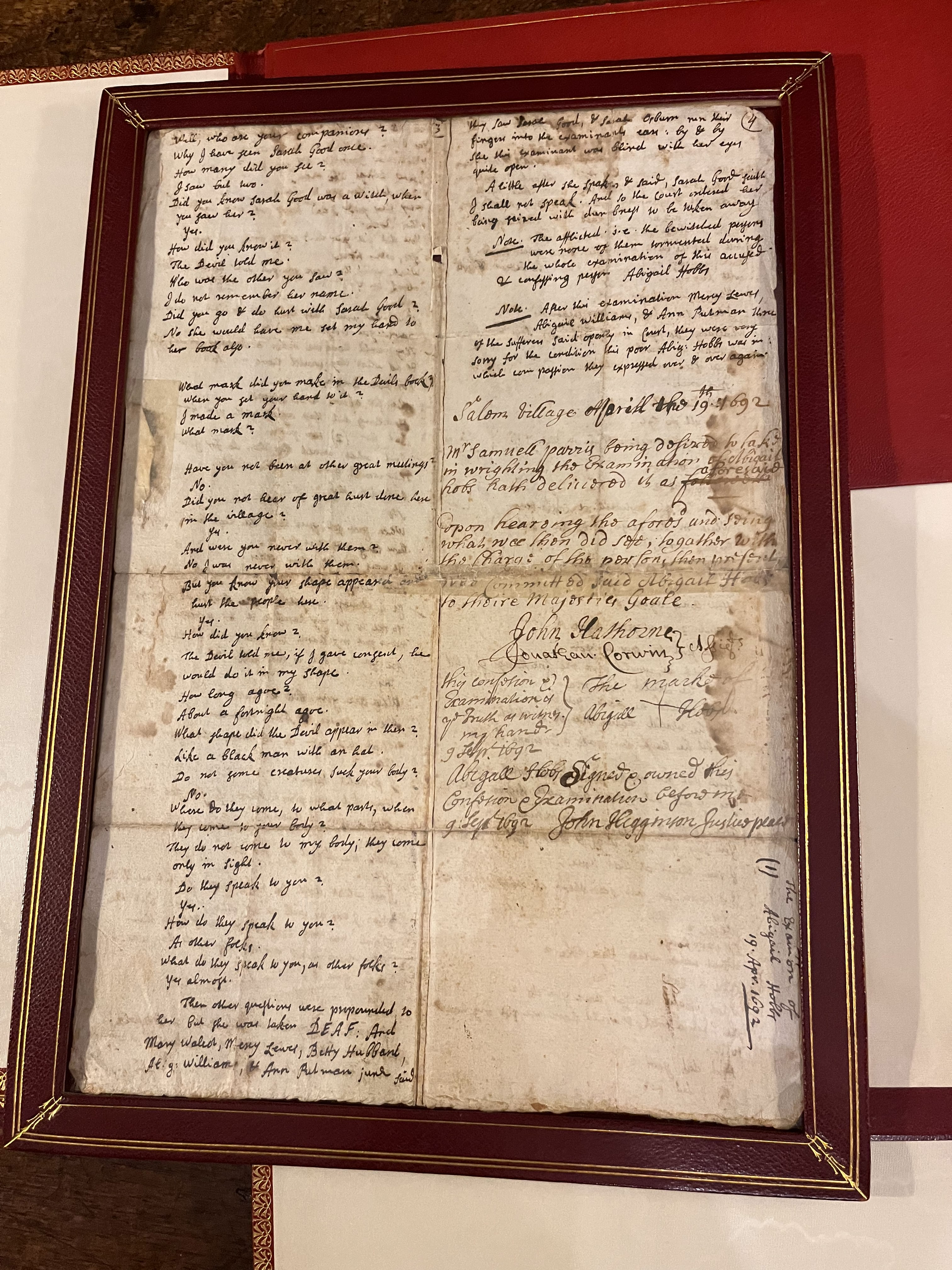
Abigail Hobbs' Confession

Governor William Phips granted the Hobbs family a reprieve in January 1693, after Chief Magistrate William Stoughton had signed the warrant for her execution. In 1710, her father, William Hobbs, petitioned the General Court to compensate him for £40 expenses that the family's imprisonment cost him but said he was willing to accept £10, which the court granted him in 1712. She was among those named in the Act for Reversal of Attainder by the Massachusetts Great and General Court, October 17, 1711.

Hobbs' confession is currently in the possession of the Philadelphia Free Library, willed to the institution by William McIntyre Elkins. It is currently stored in the Elkins Room on the third floor of the library in the Rare Book Department.

== In popular culture ==
Abigail Hobbs is the name of a teenage girl who is the daughter and acts as an accomplice to her father's serial murders in Hannibal (TV series). Abigail later develops a complicated daughter-like relationship with Hannibal Lecter, and also becomes his confidant in his serial murders.

Abigail Hobbs was referenced in the 2010 song "Abigail" by American metalcore band Motionless in White.
