= Marion L. Starkey =

American journalist

- Born: April 13, 1901
- Died: December 18, 1991 (aged 90)
- Writing career
- Genre: history
- Notable work: The Devil in Massachusetts: A Modern Enquiry into the Salem Witch Trials

Marion Lena Starkey (April 13, 1901 – December 18, 1991) was an American writer of history books, including The Devil in Massachusetts: A Modern Enquiry into the Salem Witch Trials. She was born April 13, 1901 in Worcester, MA to Arthur and Alice T. (Gray) Starkey. She earned a bachelor's degree from Boston University in 1922, and a master's degree from Harvard University in 1935.

== Career ==
After working as a newspaper editor for the Saugus Herald and teaching at the Hampton Institute and at the University of Connecticut at New London, she became a full-time writer. She began writing as a child, but did not take up writing full-time for many years. Her books include: The Tall Man from Boston, The Visionary Girls: Witchcraft in Salem Village, Cherokee Nation, The Devil in Massachusetts: A Modern Inquiry into the Salem Witch Trials, Land Where Our Fathers Died: the Settling of the Eastern Shores, Striving to Make It My Home, Congregational Way and The First Plantation: A History of Hampton and Elizabeth City County, Virginia, 1607-1887.

== The Devil in Massachusetts ==
Motivated in part by the question of how the Holocaust could have happened, Starkey delved into the Salem archives to explore the underpinnings of an earlier, American tragedy: the Salem Witch Trials. Working from court records, she created a psychological portrait tracing the development of the event from child fantasies to societal hysteria, eventually publishing The Devil in Massachusetts: A Modern Enquiry Into the Salem Witch Trials in 1949. Arthur Miller is said to have used this work in his research for The Crucible. More recently, Cornell University historian Mary Beth Norton has criticized Starkey’s book, alleging that Starkey fabricated significant data in her writing.
