= Deliverance Hobbs =

American woman accused of witchcraft

Deliverance Hobbs was accused of witchcraft during the Salem witch trials. She and her husband, William Hobbs, originally came from Casco, Maine, which was in Wabanaki Indian territory.

Her step-daughter, Abigail Hobbs, was arrested on April 18, 1692, after accusations of witchcraft. Deliverance and her husband were also arrested on suspicion of witchcraft three days later. In 1710, William Hobbs sent a petition to the General Court to pay £40 expenses that their imprisonment cost the family. Eventually, William agreed to settle for £10, which was granted to him in 1712.
