= Bridget Bishop =

Woman executed during Salem witch trials (c.1632–1692)

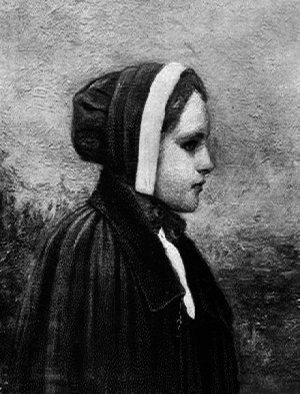
- Born: Bridget Magnus c. 1632; Norwich, England
- Died: 10 June 1692 (aged c. 60); Salem, Colony of Massachusetts
- Other names: Wasselbe; Wasselby; Waselby; Wasselbee; Wesselbee; Magnus; Magnes; Hayfer; Goody Oliver; Goody Bishop; Bridget Playfer
- Criminal charges: Witchcraft (overturned); Conspiracy with the Devil (rehabilitated)
- Criminal penalty: Death
- Criminal status: Executed by hanging (10 June 1692); Exonerated (31 October 2001)
- Spouses: Samuel Wesselby (m. 1660; died 1666) Thomas Oliver (m. 1666, died) Edward Bishop (m. 1687)
- Children: 4

Bridget Bishop (née Magnus; c. 1632 – 10 June 1692) was a midwife and the first person executed for witchcraft during the Salem witch trials in 1692. Nineteen were hanged, and one, Giles Corey, was pressed to death. Altogether, about 200 people were tried.

== Early life ==
She was born c. 1632 in Norwich, England. By Spring 1660, at the age of 28, Bridget was married to a Captain Samuel Wasselbe at St Mary in the Marsh in Norwich. Bridget and Samuel had a son named Benjamin during this time, but he died in infancy. After this, the Wasselbe couple transitioned to America.

== Boston ==
Bridget Wasselbe arrived in Boston in 1664, at the age of 32. It is likely that Bridget was pregnant during the voyage with the couple's second child, "Mary." At some point around the journey, Bridget's husband Samuel died. His cause of death is unknown, but there would be speculation about this later, during the Salem witch trials.

Bridget gave birth to Mary in Boston in 1665, but the child did not survive past infancy. By 1666, Bridget was en route to Salem, where she would spend the rest of her life.

== Salem witch trials ==
Bridget Bishop was examined due to her accusation of suspicion of "sundry acts of witchcraft". Bishop was accused of bewitching five young women, Abigail Williams, Ann Putnam, Jr., Mercy Lewis, Mary Walcott, and Elizabeth Hubbard, on the date of her examination by the authorities, 19 April 1692.

=== Trial ===
Bishop's trial, which was the first case seen before the new Court of Oyer and Terminer, began on June 2, 1692 and lasted eight days, officially starting the Salem Witchcraft Trials. A record was given of her trial by Cotton Mather in "Wonders of the Invisible World." In his book, Mather recorded that several people testified against Bishop, stating that the shape of Bishop would pinch, choke or bite them. The shape also threatened to drown one victim if she did not write her name in a certain book. According to Mather, during the trial, any time Bishop would look upon one of her accusers, they would be immediately struck down and only her touch would revive them.

More allegations were made during the trial including that of a woman saying that the apparition of Bishop tore her coat, and upon further examination her coat was found to be torn in the exact spot. Mather mentions that the truth of these many accusations carried too much suspicion, however.

Ezekiel Cheevers and John Putnam made the complaint against Bridget Bishop. Bishop was charged for committing witchcraft upon five women, Ann Putnam, Mercy Lewis, Abigail Williams, Mary Walcot, and Elis Hubert. These women claimed Bridget Bishop to be the witch who hurt them. Ann Putnam stated that Bishop called the devil her God, while other people such as Richard Coman accused Bishop of taking hold of their throats and ripping Coman and his wife out of bed. Other girls accused her of harming them with just a quick glance. Even Bishop's own husband claimed she praised the devil.

William Stacy, a middle aged man in Salem Town, testified that Bishop had previously made statements to him that other people in the town considered her to be a witch. He confronted her with the allegation that she was using witchcraft to torment him, which she denied. Another local man, Samuel Shattuck, accused Bishop of bewitching his child and also of striking his son with a spade.

He also testified that Bishop asked him to dye lace, which apparently was too small to be used on anything but a poppet, a doll used in spell-casting. John and William Bly, father and son, testified about finding poppets in Bishop's house and also about their cat that appeared to be bewitched, or poisoned, after a dispute with Bishop. Other victims of Bishop, as recorded by Mather, include Deliverance Hobbs, John Cook, Samuel Gray, and John Louder.

During her sentencing, a jury of women found a third nipple upon Bishop (then considered a sure sign of witchcraft), yet upon a second examination the nipple was not found. In the end Mather states that the greatest thing that condemned Bishop was the gross amount of lying she committed in court. According to Mather, "there was little occasion to prove the witchcraft, it being evident and notorious to all beholders."

=== Execution ===
Bishop was sentenced to death and hanged. She was recorded to be the first woman to die from hanging in the colony.

== Personal life ==
Her second marriage, on 26 July 1666, was to Thomas Oliver, a widower and prominent businessman, listed in early records as a calendar. They had one child, a daughter, Chrestian Oliver (sometimes spelled Christian), born 8 May 1667. She was earlier accused of bewitching Thomas Oliver to death, but was acquitted for lack of evidence.

Her third marriage c. 1687 was to Edward Bishop, a prosperous sawyer, whose family lived in Beverly. Her third husband, Edward Bishop, is also one of the founders of the First Church of Beverly. He was 44 at the time of the trials.

It is rumoured that Bridget ran a tavern in Salem Town, however that is unconfirmed and may be the result of a mix-up between her and Sarah Bishop.

== Traditional historical interpretation ==
"'Goodwife Bishop her Neighb'r wife of Edw: Bishop Jun'r might not be permitted to receive the Lords Supper in our church till she had given her the said Trask satisfaction for some offences that were against her .viz because the said Bishop did entertaine people in her house at unseasonable hours in the night to keep drinking and playing at shovel-board whereby discord did arise in other families & young people were in danger to bee corrupted & that the s'd Trask these things & had once gon into the house & fynding some at shovel-board had taken the of peices [sic] thay played with & thrown them into the fyre & had reprooved the said Bishop for promoting such disorders, But received no satisfaction from her about it"

— John Hawthorn and Jonath Corwin, Bridget Bishop Executed, June 10, 1692: The Examination of Bridget Byshop at Salem Village 19. Apr. 1692

== Recent historical interpretation ==
New interpretations of the historical record show that Bridget Bishop was a resident of Salem Town, and was therefore not the owner of the tavern in Salem Village. The tavern belonged to a different Edward and "Goodwife Bishop", Sarah Bishop, whom Bridget Bishop has evidently often been confused with. The evidence includes the fact that the property of John Gedney, Bridget Bishop's neighbor, and her connecting orchard/house were located in Salem Town (off present-day Washington Street).

It is considered possible that Bishop did not know her accusers. This would be supported in her deposition in Salem Village before the authorities stating, "I never saw these persons before, nor I never was in this place before." The indictments against her clearly note that she was from "Salem", which meant Salem Town, as other indictments against residents of Salem Village specified their locations as such.

It is likely that there was a bias against women, in prosecutions for witchcraft at the time. Bridget Bishop had already been accused and deemed innocent an entire decade before the witch trials. While men were still being accused, it was mostly women being indicted during this time period.
