= Salem witch trials =

Legal proceedings in Massachusetts (1692–93)

Coordinates: 42°31′20″N 70°53′46″W

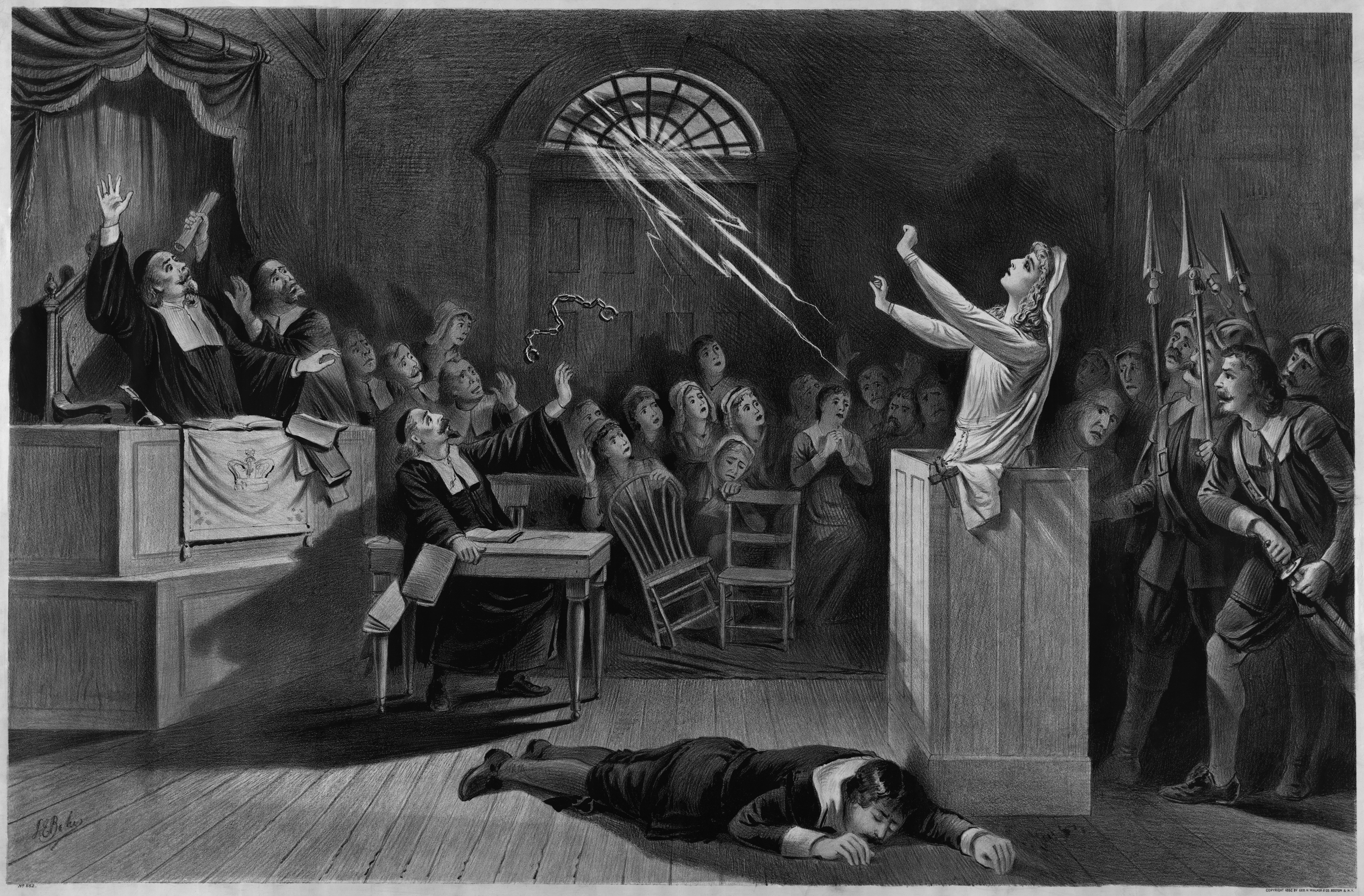
- A lithograph depicting the trials, 1892
- Date: February 1692 – May 1693 (1 year and 3 months)
- Location: Salem Town, Province of Massachusetts Bay
- Deaths: 25 (19 executed by hanging, 1 tortured to death, 5 died in jail)
- Accused: 200+
- Convicted: 30

The Salem witch trials were a series of hearings and prosecutions of people accused of witchcraft in colonial Massachusetts between February 1692 and May 1693. More than 200 people were accused. Thirty people were found guilty, nineteen of whom were executed by hanging (fourteen women and five men). One other man, Giles Corey, died under torture for refusing to enter a plea, and at least five people died in jail without trial.

Although the accusations began in Salem Village (known today as Danvers), accusations and arrests were made in numerous towns beyond the village notably in Andover and Topsfield. The residency of many of the accused is now unknown; around 151 of those people are able to be traced back to twenty-five different New England communities. The grand juries and trials for this capital crime were conducted by a Court of Oyer and Terminer in 1692 and by a Superior Court of Judicature in 1693, both held in Salem Town (the regional center for Salem Village), where the hangings also took place. It was the deadliest witch hunt in the history of colonial North America. Fourteen other women and two men were executed in Massachusetts and Connecticut during the 17th century. The Salem witch trials only came to an end when serious doubts began to arise among leading clergymen about the validity of the spectral evidence that had been used to justify so many of the convictions, and due to the sheer number of those accused, "including several prominent citizens of the colony".

In the years after the trials, "several of the accusers – mostly teenage girls – admitted that they had fabricated their charges." In 1702, the General Court of Massachusetts declared the trials "unlawful", and in 1711 the colonial legislature annulled the convictions, passing a bill "mentioning 22 individuals by name" and reversing their attainders.

The episode is one of colonial America's most notorious cases of mass hysteria and moral panic. It was not entirely unique, but a colonial manifestation of the much broader phenomenon of witch trials in the early modern period, which took the lives of tens of thousands in Europe. The Puritans who settled New England would have been familiar with witch trials in England.

In America, Salem's events have been used in political rhetoric and popular literature as a vivid cautionary tale about the dangers of isolation, religious extremism, false accusations, and lapses in due process. Many historians consider the lasting effects of the trials to have been highly influential in the history of the United States. According to historian George Lincoln Burr, "the Salem witchcraft was the rock on which the [New England] theocracy shattered."

At the 300th anniversary events held in 1992 to commemorate the victims of the trials, a park was dedicated in Salem and a memorial in Danvers. In 1957, an act passed by the Massachusetts legislature absolved six people, while another one, passed in 2001, absolved five other victims. As of 2004, there was still talk about exonerating or pardoning all of the victims. In 2022, the last convicted Salem witch, Elizabeth Johnson Jr., was officially exonerated, 329 years after she had been found guilty.

In January 2016, the University of Virginia announced its Gallows Hill Project historical archeology team had determined the execution site in Salem, where the 19 "witches" had been hanged. The city dedicated the Proctor's Ledge Memorial to the victims there in 2017.

== Background ==
While witch trials had begun to fade out across much of Europe by the mid-17th century, they continued on the fringes of Europe and in the American Colonies. Witchcraft had been a capital offense codified in the Massachusetts Body of Liberties since 1641, however it was repealed in 1684. The events in 1692–1693 in Salem became a last, brief outburst of a sort of hysteria in the New World, while the practice was already waning in most of Europe.

In 1668, in Against Modern Sadducism, English clergyman and philosopher Joseph Glanvill claimed that he could prove the existence of witches and ghosts of the supernatural realm. Glanvill wrote about the "denial of the bodily resurrection, and the [supernatural] spirits."

In his treatise, Glanvill claimed that ingenious men should believe in witches and apparitions; if they doubted the reality of spirits, they not only denied demons but also the almighty God. Glanvill wanted to prove that the supernatural could not be denied; those who did deny apparitions were considered heretics, for it also disproved their beliefs in angels. Works by men such as Glanvill and Cotton Mather tried to prove that "demons were alive".

=== Accusations ===
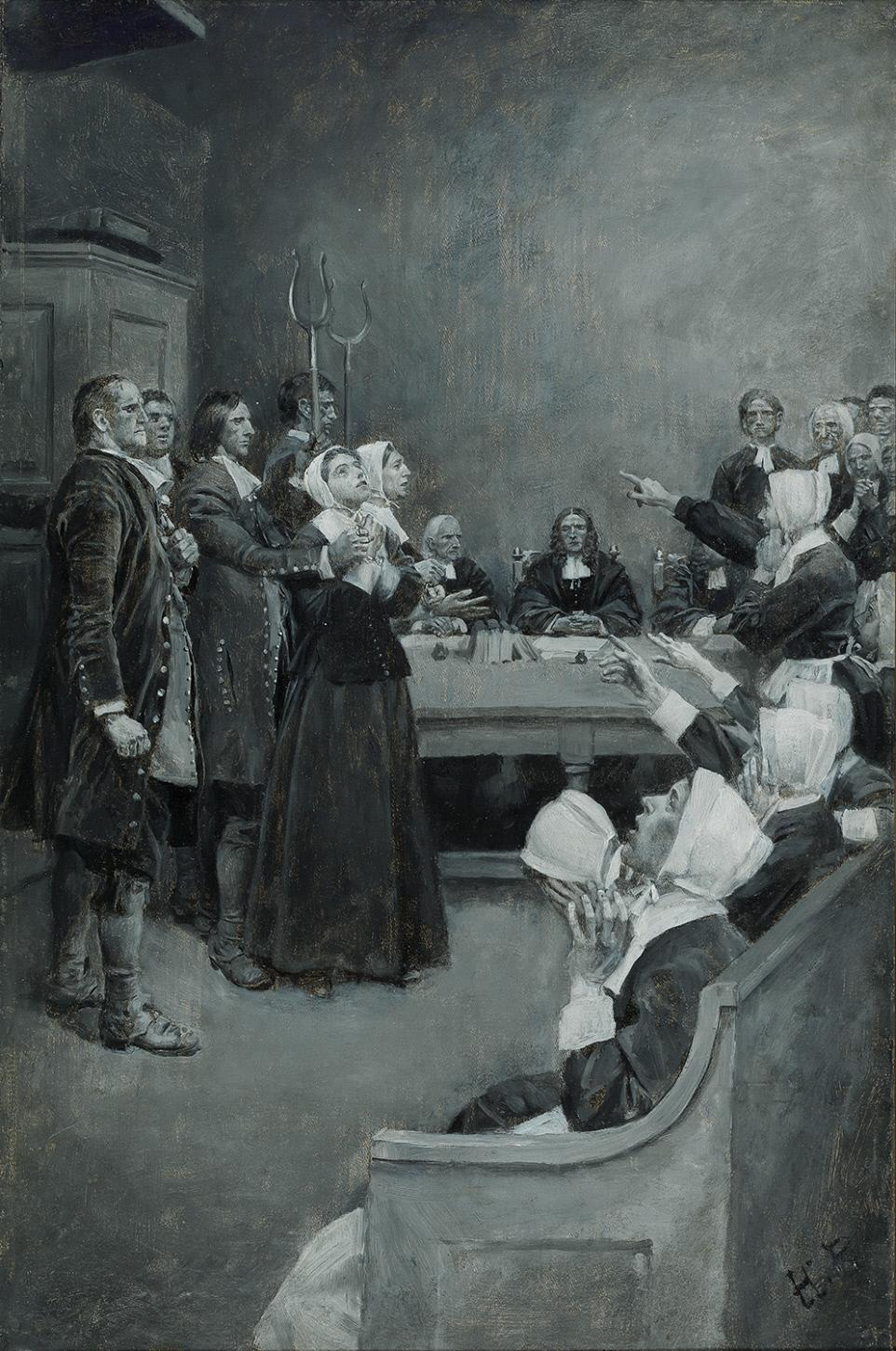
Two alleged witches being accused in the Salem witch trials, 1892 engraving

The trials began after a few local women in Salem Village were accused of witchcraft by four young girls, Betty Parris (9), Abigail Williams (11), Ann Putnam Jr. (12), and Elizabeth Hubbard (17). The accusations centered around the concept of "affliction", and the women accused of having caused physical and mental harm to the girls through witchcraft.

=== Recorded witchcraft sentencing in New England ===
The earliest recorded witchcraft execution was that of Alse Young in 1647 in Hartford, Connecticut, the start of the Connecticut Witch Trials which lasted until 1663. Historian Clarence F. Jewett included a list of other people executed in New England in his 1881 book.

Elizabeth Morse had been accused and placed on house arrest in the early 1680s in Newbury, Massachusetts. She had been found guilty of witchcraft because seventeen witnesses testified.

=== Political context ===
New England had been settled by religious dissenters seeking to build a Bible-based society according to their own chosen discipline. The original 1629 Royal Charter of the Massachusetts Bay Colony was vacated in 1684, after which King James II installed Sir Edmund Andros as the governor of the Dominion of New England. Andros was ousted in 1689 after the "Glorious Revolution" in England replaced the Catholic James II with the Protestant co-rulers William and Mary.

Simon Bradstreet and Thomas Danforth, the colony's last leaders under the old charter, resumed their posts as governor and deputy governor, but lacked constitutional authority to rule because the old charter had been vacated. At the same time, tensions erupted between English colonists settling in "the Eastward" (the present-day coast of Maine) and French-supported Wabanaki people of that territory in what came to be known as King William's War. This was 13 years after the devastating King Philip's War with the Wampanoag and other indigenous tribes in southern and western New England. In October 1690, Sir William Phips led an unsuccessful attack on French-held Quebec. Between 1689 and 1692, Native Americans continued to attack many English settlements along the Maine coast, leading to the abandonment of some of the settlements and resulting in a flood of refugees into areas like Essex County.

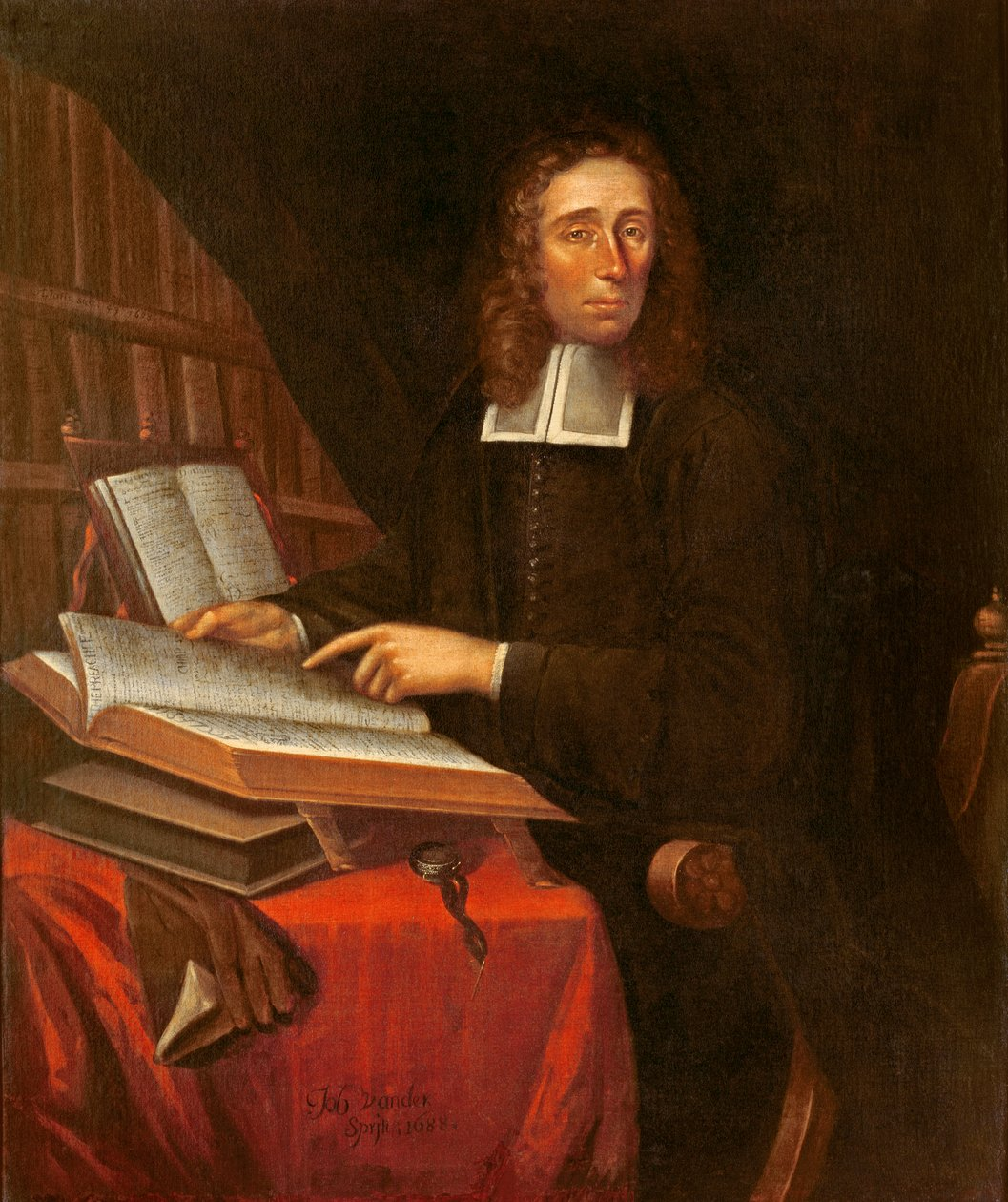
1688 portrait of Increase Mather by Joan van der Spriet

A new charter for the enlarged Province of Massachusetts Bay was given final approval in England on October 16, 1691. Increase Mather had been working on obtaining the charter for four years, with William Phips often joining him in London and helping him gain entry to Whitehall. Increase Mather had published a book on witchcraft in 1684 and his son Cotton Mather published one in 1689. Increase Mather brought out a London edition of his son's book in 1690. Increase Mather claimed to have picked all the men to be included in the new government. News of Mather's charter and the appointment of Phips as the new governor had reached Boston by late January, and a copy of the new charter reached Boston on February 8, 1692. Phips arrived in Boston on May 14 and was sworn in as governor two days later, along with Lieutenant Governor William Stoughton. One of the first orders of business for the new governor and council on May 27, 1692, was the formal nomination of county justices of the peace, sheriffs, and the commission of a Special Court of Oyer and Terminer to handle the large numbers of people who were "thronging" the jails.

=== Local context ===
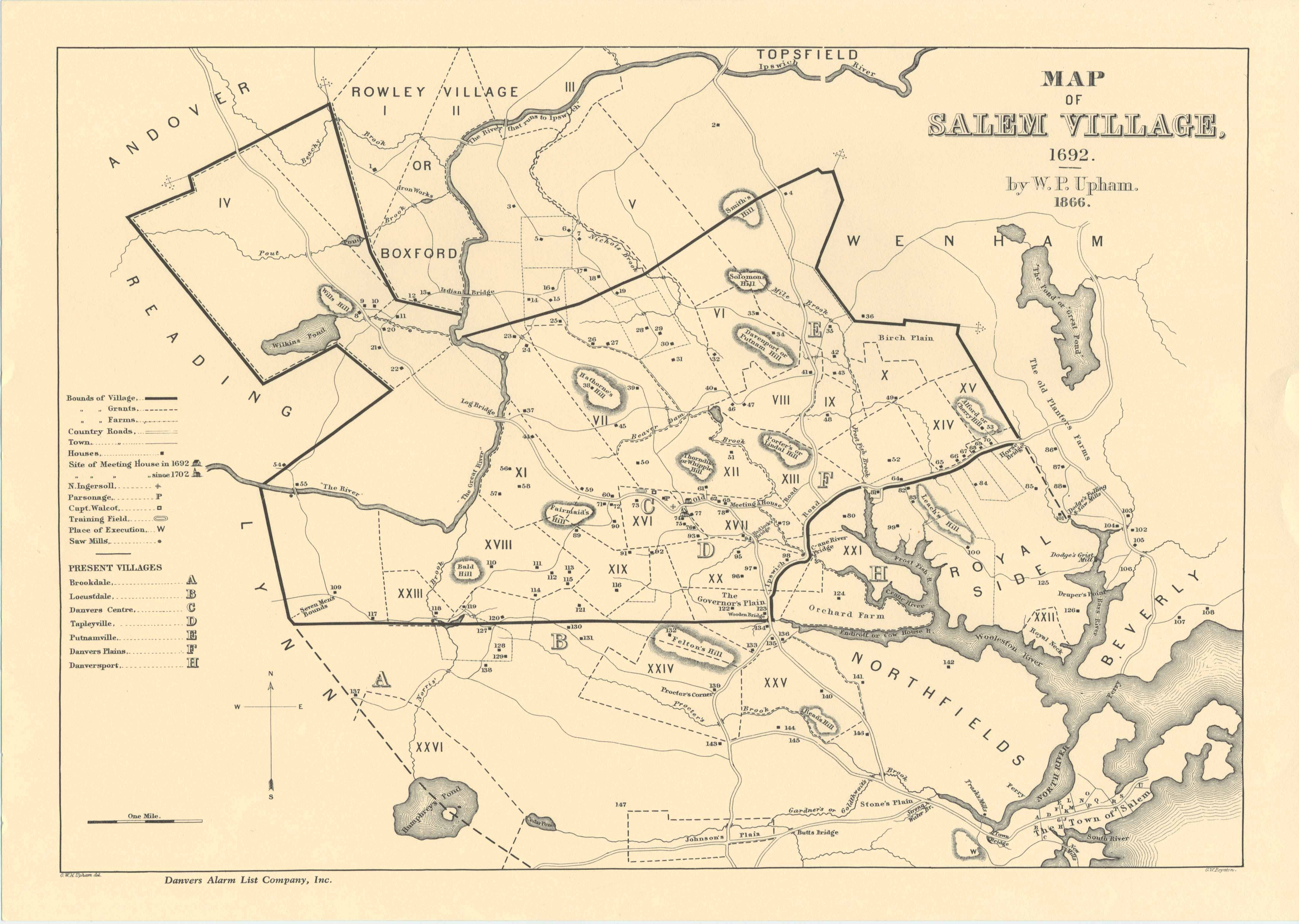
A map of Salem Village, 1692, with Salem Town at the lower-right

Salem Village (present-day Danvers, Massachusetts) was known for its fractious population, which not only suffered from many internal disputes, but also had a strained relationship with Salem Town (present-day Salem). Arguments about property lines, grazing rights, and church privileges were rife, and neighbors considered the population to be "quarrelsome". In 1672, the villagers had voted to hire a minister of their own, apart from Salem Town. The first two ministers, James Bayley, who served from 1673 to 1679, and George Burroughs, who served from 1680 to 1683, stayed only a few years each, departing after the congregation failed to pay their full rate. Burroughs was subsequently arrested at the height of the witchcraft hysteria and was hanged as a witch in August 1692.

Despite the ministers' rights being upheld by the General Court and the parish being admonished, each of the two ministers still chose to leave. The third minister, Deodat Lawson, who served from 1684 to 1688, stayed for a short time, leaving after the church in Salem refused to ordain him. The parish disagreed about Salem Village's choice of Samuel Parris as its first ordained minister. On June 18, 1689, the villagers agreed to hire Parris for £66 annually, "one third part in money and the other two third parts in provisions", and use of the parsonage.

On October 10, 1689, however, they raised Parris' benefits, voting to grant him the deed to the parsonage and two acres (0.8 hectares) of land. This conflicted with a 1681 village resolution which stated that "it shall not be lawful for the inhabitants of this village to convey the houses or lands or any other concerns belonging to the Ministry to any particular persons or person: not for any cause by vote or other ways".

Though the prior ministers' fates and the level of contention in Salem Village were valid reasons for caution in accepting the position, Rev. Parris increased the village's divisions by delaying his acceptance. He did not seem able to settle his new parishioners' disputes: by deliberately seeking out "iniquitous behavior" in his congregation and making church members in good standing suffer public penance for small infractions, he contributed significantly to the tension within the village. Its bickering increased unabated. Historian Marion Starkey suggests that, in this atmosphere, serious conflict may have been inevitable.

=== Religious context ===
Prior to the constitutional turmoil of the 1680s, the Massachusetts government had been dominated by conservative Puritan leaders. While Puritans and the Church of England both shared a common influence in Calvinism, Puritans had opposed many of the traditions of the Church of England, including use of the Book of Common Prayer, the use of clergy vestments during services, the use of the sign of the cross at baptism, and kneeling to receive communion, all of which they believed constituted popery. King Charles I was hostile to this viewpoint, and Anglican church officials tried to repress these dissenting views during the 1620s and 1630s. Some Puritans and other religious minorities had sought refuge in the Netherlands but ultimately many made a major migration to colonial North America to establish their own society.

These immigrants, who were mostly constituted of families, established several of the earliest colonies in New England, of which the Massachusetts Bay Colony was the largest and most economically important. They intended to build a society based on their religious beliefs. Colonial leaders were elected by the freemen of the colony, those individuals who had had their religious experiences formally examined and had been admitted to one of the colony's Puritan congregations. The colonial leadership were prominent members of their congregations and regularly consulted with the local ministers on issues facing the colony.

In the early 1640s, England erupted in civil war. The Puritan-dominated Parliamentarians emerged victorious, and the Crown was supplanted by the Protectorate of Oliver Cromwell in 1653. Its failure led to restoration of the old order under Charles II. Immigration of Puritans to New England slowed significantly in these years. In Massachusetts, a successful merchant class began to develop that was less religiously motivated than the colony's early settlers.

=== Gender context ===
A majority of people accused and convicted of witchcraft were women (about 78%). Overall, the Puritan belief and prevailing New England culture was that women were inherently sinful and more susceptible to damnation than men were. Throughout their daily lives, Puritans, especially Puritan women, actively attempted to thwart attempts by the Devil to overtake them and their souls. Indeed, Puritans held the belief that men and women were equal in the eyes of God, but not in the eyes of the Devil. Women's souls were seen as unprotected in their so-called "weak and vulnerable bodies". Several factors may explain why women were more likely to admit guilt of witchcraft than men. Historian Elizabeth Reis asserts that some likely believed they had truly given in to the Devil, and others might have believed they had done so temporarily. However, because those who confessed were reintegrated into society, some women might have confessed in order to spare their own lives.

Quarrels with neighbors often incited witchcraft allegations. One example of this is Abigail Faulkner, who was accused in 1692. Faulkner admitted she was "angry at what folk said", and the Devil may have temporarily overtaken her, causing harm to her neighbors. Women who did not conform to the norms of Puritan society were more likely to be the target of an accusation, especially those who were unmarried or did not have children.

=== Publicising witchcraft ===
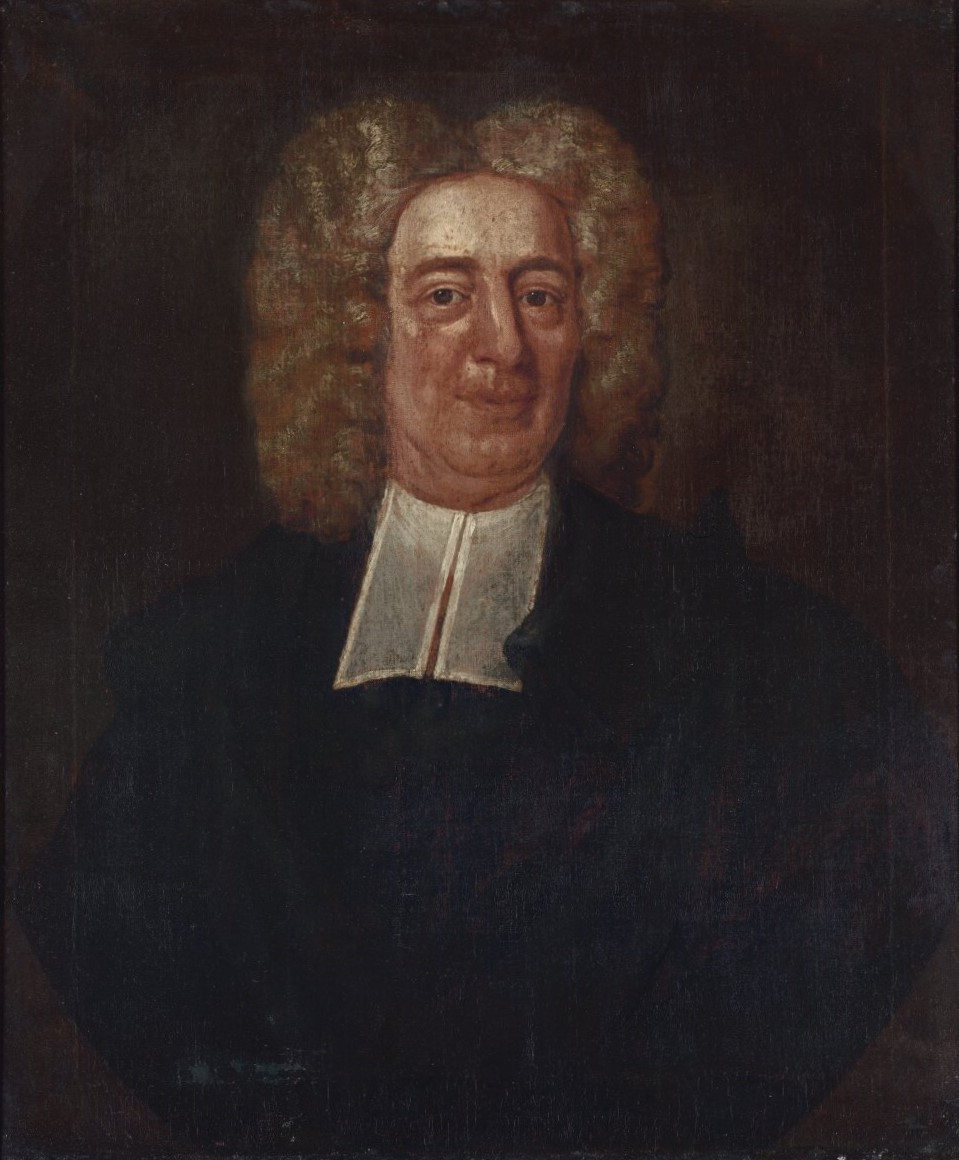
Reverend Cotton Mather

Cotton Mather, a minister of Boston's North Church, was a prolific publisher of pamphlets, including some that expressed his belief in witchcraft. In his book Memorable Providences Relating to Witchcrafts and Possessions (1689), Mather describes his "oracular observations" and how "stupendous witchcraft" had affected the children of Boston mason John Goodwin.

Mather illustrates how the Goodwins' eldest child had been tempted by the devil and had stolen linen from the washerwoman Goody Glover. Glover, of Irish Catholic descent, was characterized as a disagreeable old woman and described by her husband as a witch; this may have been why she was accused of casting spells on the Goodwin children. After the event, four out of six Goodwin children began to have strange fits, or what some people referred to as "the disease of astonishment". The manifestations attributed to the disease quickly became associated with witchcraft. Symptoms included neck and back pains, tongues being drawn from their throats, and loud random outcries; other symptoms included having no control over their bodies such as becoming limber, flapping their arms like birds, or trying to harm others as well as themselves. These symptoms fueled the craze of 1692.

== Timeline ==
=== Initial events ===
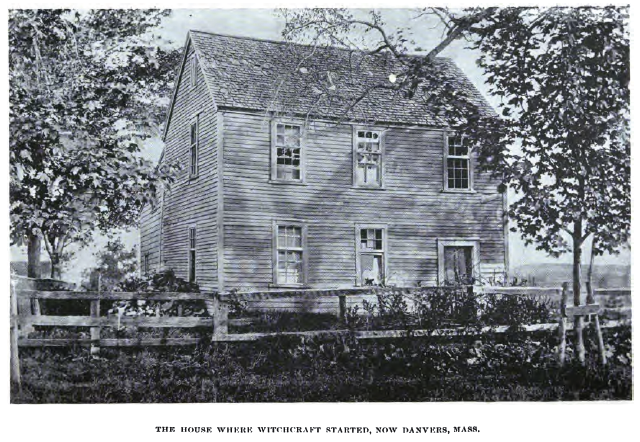
The parsonage in Salem Village, as photographed in the late 19th century

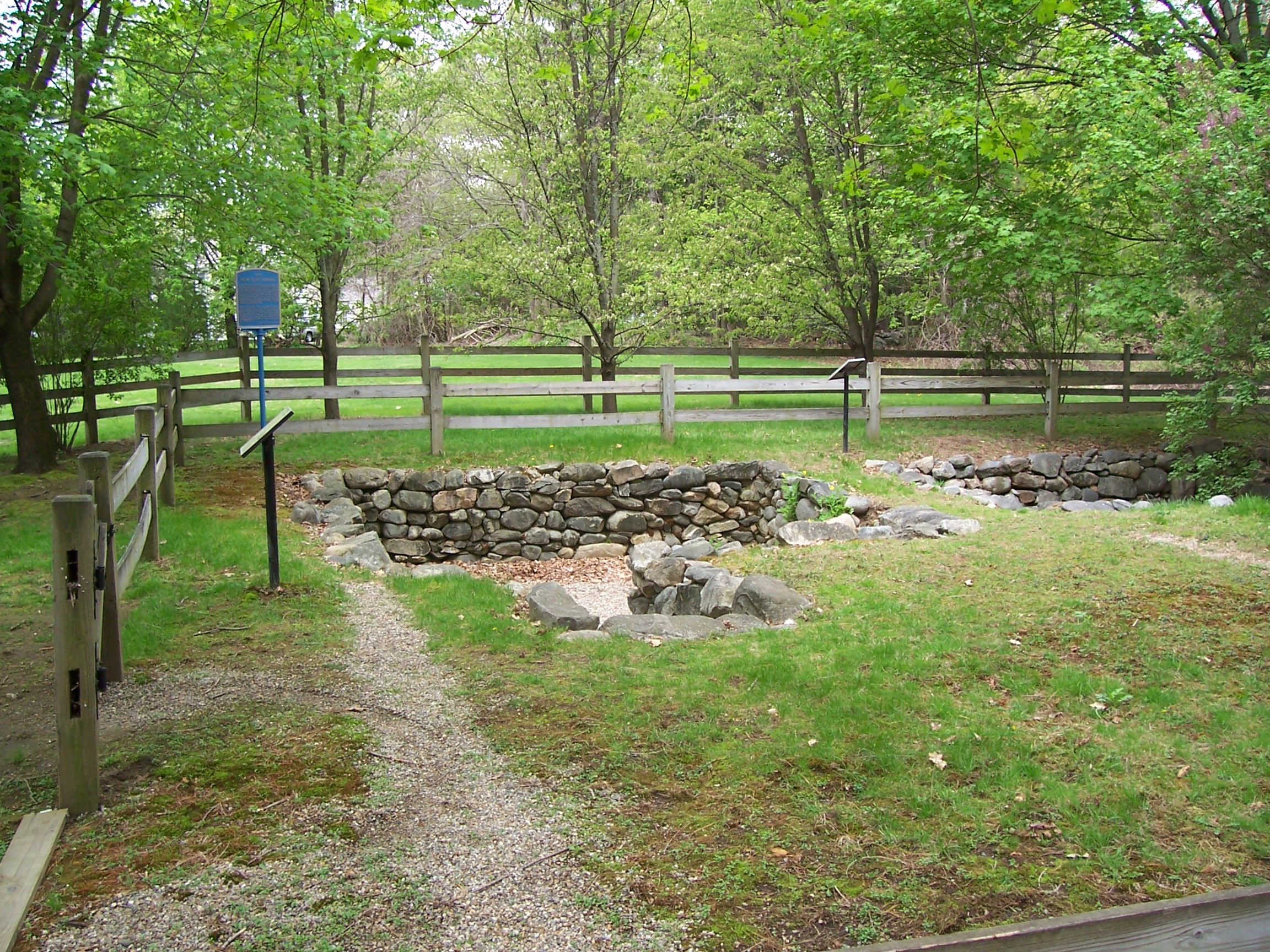
The present-day archaeological site of the Salem Village parsonage

In Salem Village in February 1692, Betty Parris (age 9) and her cousin Abigail Williams (age 11), the daughter and the niece, respectively, of Reverend Samuel Parris, began to have fits described as "beyond the power of epileptic fits or natural disease to effect" by John Hale, the minister of the nearby town of Beverly. The girls screamed, threw things about the room, uttered strange sounds, crawled under furniture, and contorted themselves into peculiar positions, according to the eyewitness account of Reverend Deodat Lawson, a former minister in Salem Village.

The girls complained of being pinched and pricked with pins. A doctor, historically assumed to be William Griggs, could find no physical evidence of any ailment. Other young women in the village began to exhibit similar behaviors. When Lawson preached as a guest in the Salem Village meetinghouse, he was interrupted several times by the outbursts of the afflicted.

The first three people accused and arrested for allegedly afflicting Betty Parris, Abigail Williams, 12-year-old Ann Putnam, Jr., and Elizabeth Hubbard, were Sarah Good, Sarah Osborne, and Tituba. Some historians believe that the accusation by Ann Putnam Jr. suggests that a family feud may have been a major cause of the witch trials. At the time, a vicious rivalry was underway between the Putnam and Porter families, one which deeply polarized the people of Salem. Citizens would often have heated debates, which escalated into full-fledged fighting, based solely on their opinion of the feud. Some of the physical symptoms resembled convulsive ergot poisoning, proposed 284 years later.

Sarah Good was a destitute woman accused of witchcraft because of her reputation. At her trial, she was accused of rejecting Puritan ideals of self-control and discipline when she chose to torment and "scorn [children] instead of leading them towards the path of salvation".

Sarah Osborne rarely attended church meetings. She was accused of witchcraft because the Puritans believed that Osborne had her own self-interests in mind following her remarriage to an indentured servant. The citizens of the town disapproved of her trying to control her son's inheritance from her previous marriage.

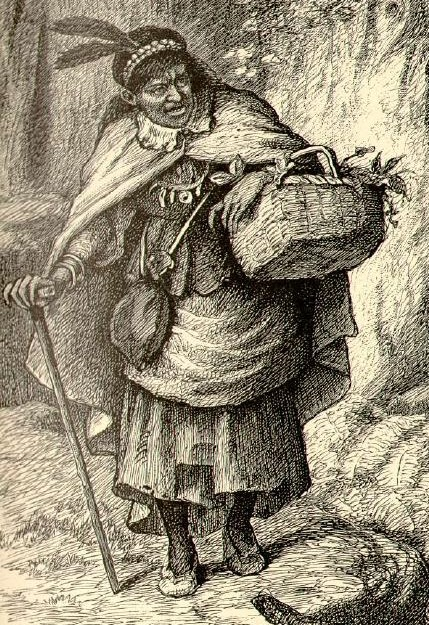
Illustration of Tituba by John W. Ehninger, 1902

Tituba, an enslaved Kalina woman from the West Indies, likely became a target because of her ethnic differences from most of the other villagers. She was accused of attracting girls like Abigail Williams and Betty Parris with stories of enchantment from the Malleus Maleficarum. These tales about sexual encounters with demons, swaying the minds of men, and fortune-telling were said to stimulate the imaginations of girls and made Tituba an obvious target of accusations.

Each of these women was a kind of outcast and exhibited many of the character traits typical of the "usual suspects" for witchcraft accusations, and they were left to defend themselves. Brought before the local magistrates on the complaint of witchcraft, they were interrogated for several days, starting on March 1, 1692, then sent to jail.

In March, others were accused of witchcraft: Martha Corey, child Dorothy Good, and Rebecca Nurse in Salem Village, and Rachel Clinton in nearby Ipswich. Martha Corey had expressed skepticism about the credibility of the girls' accusations and thus drawn attention. The charges against her and Rebecca Nurse deeply troubled the community because Martha Corey was a full covenanted member of the Church in Salem Village, as was Rebecca Nurse in the Church in Salem Town. If such upstanding people could be witches, the townspeople thought, then anybody could be a witch, and church membership was no protection from accusation. Dorothy Good, the daughter of Sarah Good, was only four years old but was not exempted from questioning by the magistrates; her answers were construed as a confession that implicated her mother. In Ipswich, Rachel Clinton was arrested for witchcraft at the end of March on independent charges unrelated to the afflictions of the girls in Salem Village.

The initial examinations included physical exams where the accused were examined for unique markings such as moles, birth marks that were commonly believed to be associated with the Devil's influence. It was thought that those markings represented the Devil drinking the accused women's blood.

=== Accusations and examinations before local magistrates ===
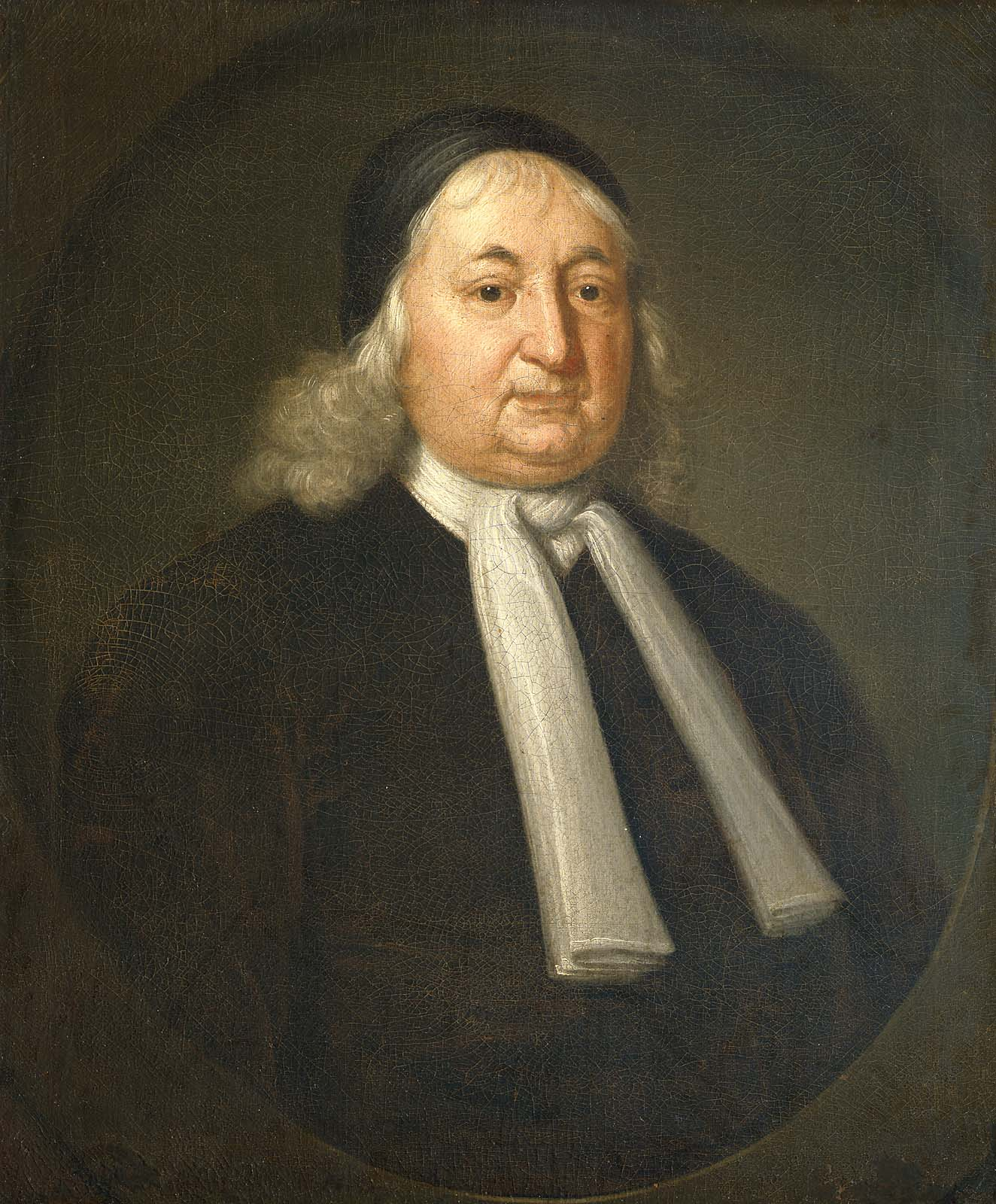
Magistrate Samuel Sewall

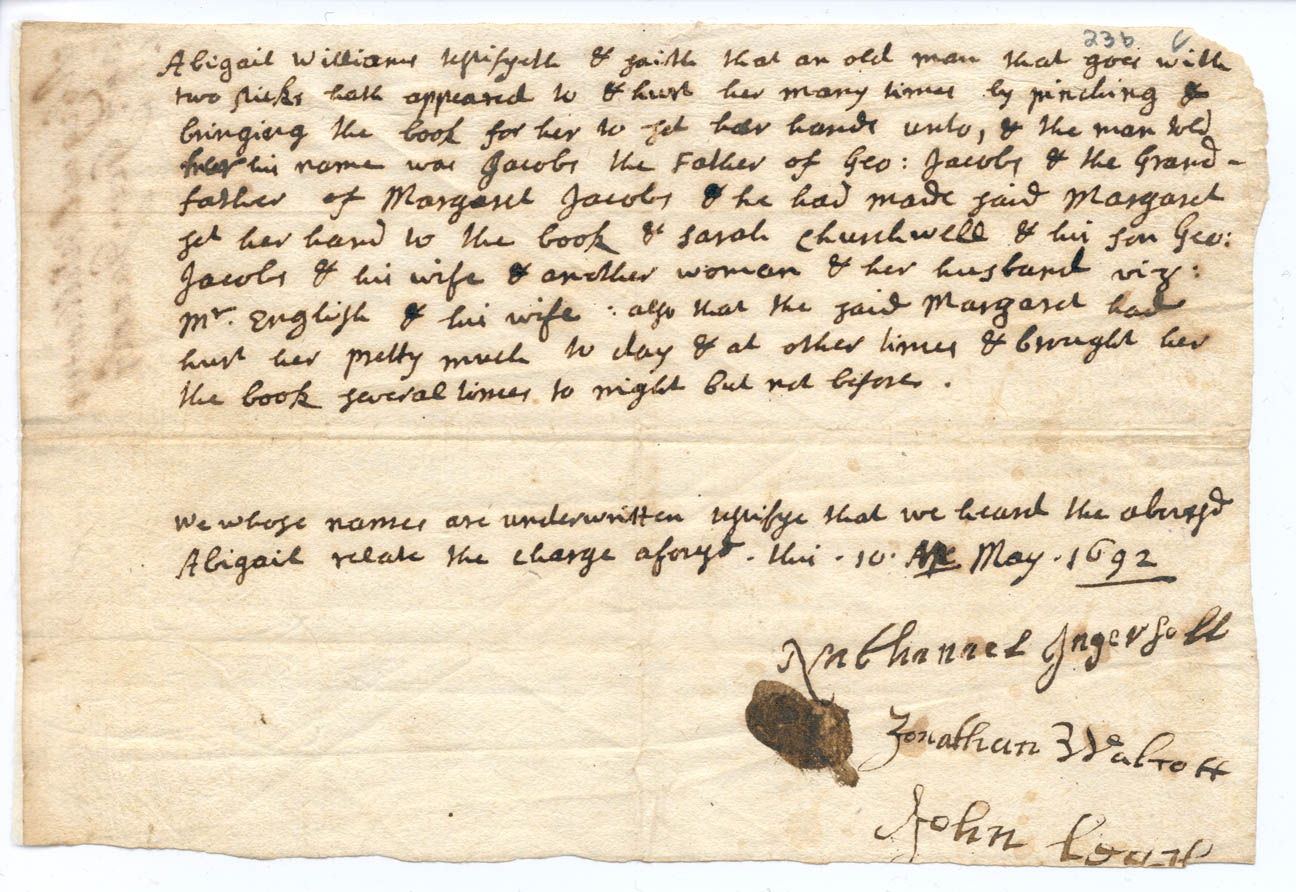
The deposition of Abigail Williams v. George Jacobs, Sr.

When Sarah Cloyce (Nurse's sister) and Elizabeth (Bassett) Proctor were arrested in April, they were brought before John Hathorne and Jonathan Corwin at a meeting in Salem Town. The men were both local magistrates and also members of the Governor's Council. Present for the examination were Deputy Governor Thomas Danforth, and Assistants Samuel Sewall, Samuel Appleton, James Russell and Isaac Addington. During the proceedings, objections by Elizabeth's husband, John Proctor, resulted in his arrest that day.

Within a week, Giles Corey (Martha's husband and a covenanted church member in Salem Town), Abigail Hobbs, Bridget Bishop, Mary Warren (a servant in the Proctor household and sometime accuser), and Deliverance Hobbs (stepmother of Abigail Hobbs), were arrested and examined. Abigail Hobbs, Mary Warren, and Deliverance Hobbs all confessed and began naming additional people as accomplices. More arrests followed: Sarah Wildes, William Hobbs (husband of Deliverance and father of Abigail), Nehemiah Abbott Jr., Mary Eastey (sister of Cloyce and Nurse), Edward Bishop Jr. and his wife Sarah Bishop, and Mary English.

On April 30, Reverend George Burroughs, Lydia Dustin, Susannah Martin, Dorcas Hoar, Sarah Morey, and Philip English (Mary's husband) were arrested. Nehemiah Abbott Jr. was released because the accusers agreed he was not the person whose specter had afflicted them. Mary Eastey was released for a few days after her initial arrest because the accusers failed to confirm that it was she who had afflicted them; she was arrested again when the accusers reconsidered. In May, accusations continued to pour in, but some of the suspects began to evade apprehension. Multiple warrants were issued before John Willard and Elizabeth Colson were apprehended; George Jacobs Jr. and Daniel Andrews were not caught. Until this point, all the proceedings were investigative, but on May 27, 1692, William Phips ordered the establishment of a Special Court of Oyer and Terminer for Suffolk, Essex and Middlesex counties to prosecute the cases of those in jail. Warrants were issued for more people. Sarah Osborne, one of the first three persons accused, died in jail on May 10, 1692.

Warrants were issued for 36 more people, with examinations continuing to take place in Salem Village: Sarah Dustin (daughter of Lydia Dustin), Ann Sears, Bethiah Carter Sr. and her daughter Bethiah Carter Jr., George Jacobs Sr. and his granddaughter Margaret Jacobs, John Willard, Alice Parker, Ann Pudeator, Abigail Soames, George Jacobs Jr. (son of George Jacobs Sr. and father of Margaret Jacobs), Daniel Andrew, Rebecca Jacobs (wife of George Jacobs Jr. and sister of Daniel Andrew), Sarah Buckley and her daughter Mary Witheridge.

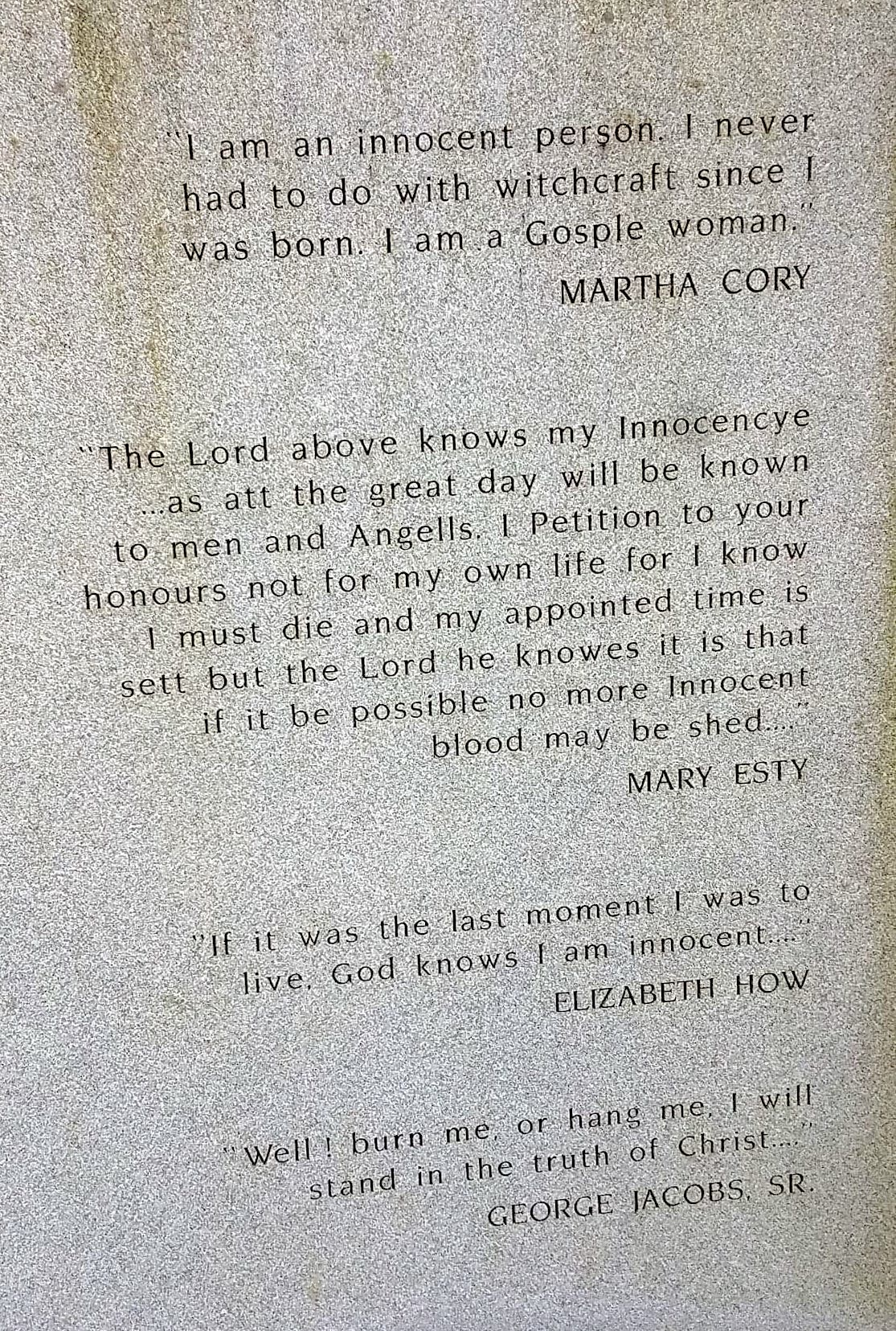
Statements of innocence, Part of the memorial for the victims of the 1692 witchcraft trials, Danvers, Massachusetts

Also included were Elizabeth Colson, Elizabeth Hart, Thomas Farrar Sr. Roger Toothaker, Sarah Proctor (daughter of John and Elizabeth Proctor), Sarah Bassett (sister-in-law of Elizabeth Proctor), Susannah Roots, Mary DeRich (another sister-in-law of Elizabeth Proctor), Sarah Pease, Elizabeth Cary, Martha Carrier, Elizabeth Fosdick, Wilmot Redd, Sarah Rice, Elizabeth Howe, Capt. John Alden (son of John Alden and Priscilla Mullins), William Proctor (son of John and Elizabeth Proctor), John Flood, Mary Toothaker (wife of Roger Toothaker and sister of Martha Carrier) and her daughter Margaret Toothaker, and Arthur Abbott. When the Court of Oyer and Terminer convened at the end of May, the total number of people in custody was 62.

Cotton Mather wrote to one of the judges, John Richards, a member of his congregation, on May 31, 1692, expressing his support of the prosecutions, but cautioning him:

[D]o not lay more stress on pure spectral evidence than it will bear [...] It is very certain that the Devils have sometimes represented the Shapes of persons not only innocent, but also very virtuous. Though I believe that the just God then ordinarily provides a way for the speedy vindication of the persons thus abused.

=== Formal prosecution: The Court of Oyer and Terminer ===
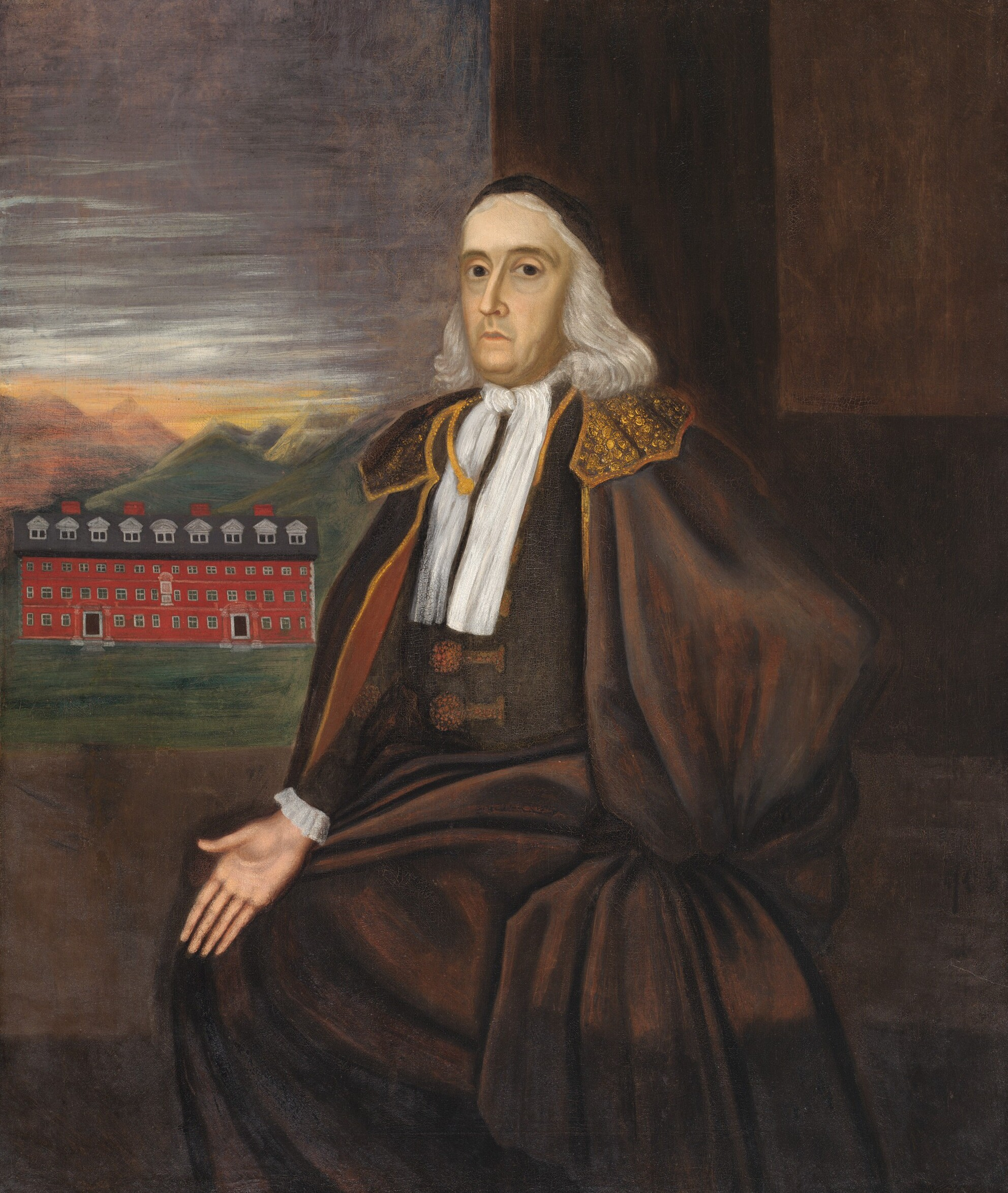
Chief Magistrate William Stoughton

The Court of Oyer and Terminer convened in Salem Town on June 2, 1692, with William Stoughton, the new Lieutenant Governor, as Chief Magistrate, Thomas Newton as the Crown's Attorney prosecuting the cases, and Stephen Sewall as clerk. Bridget Bishop's case was the first brought to the grand jury, who endorsed all the indictments against her. Bishop was described as not living a Puritan lifestyle, for she wore black clothing and odd costumes, which was against the Puritan code. When she was examined before her trial, Bishop was asked about her coat, which had been awkwardly "cut or torn in two ways".

This, along with her "immoral" lifestyle, affirmed to the jury that Bishop was a witch. She went to trial the same day and was convicted. On June 3, the grand jury endorsed indictments against Rebecca Nurse and John Willard, but they did not go to trial immediately, for reasons which are unclear. Bishop was executed by hanging on June 10, 1692.

Immediately following this execution, the court adjourned for 20 days (until June 30) while it sought advice from New England's most influential ministers "upon the state of things as they then stood." Their collective response came back dated June 15 and composed by Cotton Mather:

1. The afflicted state of our poor neighbours, that are now suffering by molestations from the invisible world, we apprehend so deplorable, that we think their condition calls for the utmost help of all persons in their several capacities.
2. We cannot but, with all thankfulness, acknowledge the success which the merciful God has given unto the sedulous and assiduous endeavours of our honourable rulers, to detect the abominable witchcrafts which have been committed in the country, humbly praying, that the discovery of those mysterious and mischievous wickednesses may be perfected.
3. We judge that, in the prosecution of these and all such witchcrafts, there is need of a very critical and exquisite caution, lest by too much credulity for things received only upon the Devil's authority, there be a door opened for a long train of miserable consequences, and Satan get an advantage over us; for we should not be ignorant of his devices.
4. As in complaints upon witchcrafts, there may be matters of inquiry which do not amount unto matters of presumption, and there may be matters of presumption which yet may not be matters of conviction, so it is necessary, that all proceedings thereabout be managed with an exceeding tenderness towards those that may be complained of, especially if they have been persons formerly of an unblemished reputation.
5. When the first inquiry is made into the circumstances of such as may lie under the just suspicion of witchcrafts, we could wish that there may be admitted as little as is possible of such noise, company and openness as may too hastily expose them that are examined, and that there may no thing be used as a test for the trial of the suspected, the lawfulness whereof may be doubted among the people of God; but that the directions given by such judicious writers as Perkins and Bernard [be consulted in such a case].
6. Presumptions whereupon persons may be committed, and, much more, convictions whereupon persons may be condemned as guilty of witchcrafts, ought certainly to be more considerable than barely the accused person's being represented by a specter unto the afflicted; inasmuch as it is an undoubted and notorious thing, that a demon may, by God's permission, appear, even to ill purposes, in the shape of an innocent, yea, and a virtuous man. Nor can we esteem alterations made in the sufferers, by a look or touch of the accused, to be an infallible evidence of guilt, but frequently liable to be abused by the Devil's legerdemains.
7. We know not whether some remarkable affronts given to the Devils by our disbelieving those testimonies whose whole force and strength is from them alone, may not put a period unto the progress of the dreadful calamity begun upon us, in the accusations of so many persons, whereof some, we hope, are yet clear from the great transgression laid unto their charge.
8. Nevertheless, we cannot but humbly recommend unto the government, the speedy and vigorous prosecution of such as have rendered themselves obnoxious, according to the direction given in the laws of God, and the wholesome statutes of the English nation, for the detection of witchcrafts.

Thomas Hutchinson sums the letter, "The two first and the last sections of this advice took away the force of all the others, and the prosecutions went on with more vigor than before." (Reprinting the letter years later in Magnalia, Cotton Mather left out these "two first and the last" sections.) Major Nathaniel Saltonstall, Esq., resigned from the court on or about June 16, presumably dissatisfied with the letter and that it had not outright barred the admission of spectral evidence. According to Upham, Saltonstall deserves the credit for "being the only public man of his day who had the sense or courage to condemn the proceedings, at the start." (chapt. VII) More people were accused, arrested and examined, but now in Salem Town, by former local magistrates John Hathorne, Jonathan Corwin, and Bartholomew Gedney, who had become judges of the Court of Oyer and Terminer. Suspect Roger Toothaker died in prison on June 16, 1692.

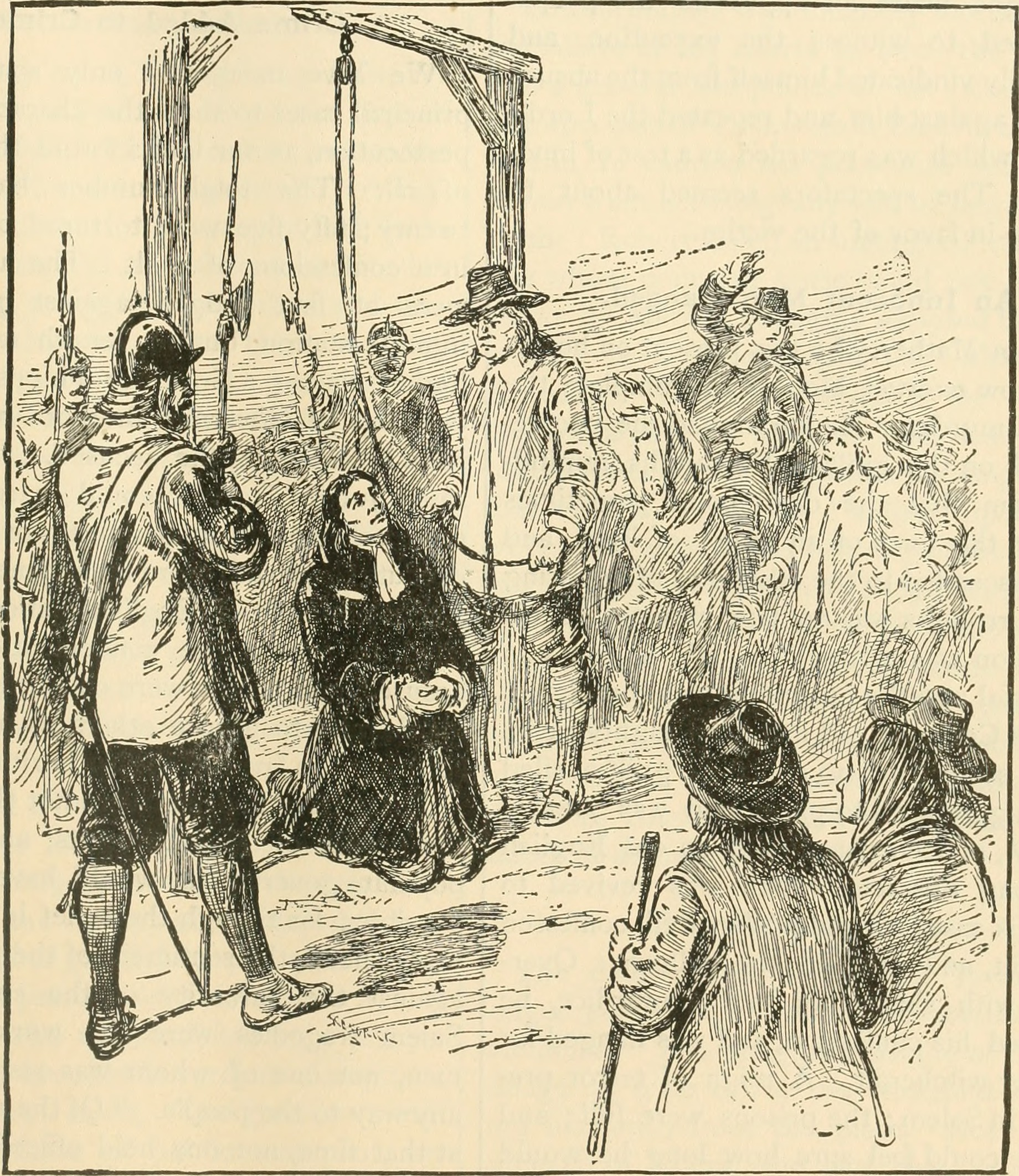
Illustration of the execution of George Burroughs by Henry Davenport Northrop, 1901

From June 30 through early July, grand juries endorsed indictments against Sarah Good, Elizabeth Howe, Susannah Martin, Elizabeth Proctor, John Proctor, Martha Carrier, Sarah Wildes and Dorcas Hoar. Sarah Good, Elizabeth Howe, Susannah Martin and Sarah Wildes, along with Rebecca Nurse, went to trial at this time, where they were found guilty. All five women were executed by hanging on July 19, 1692. In mid-July, the constable in Andover invited the afflicted girls from Salem Village to visit with his wife to try to determine who was causing her afflictions. Ann Foster, her daughter Mary Lacey Sr., and granddaughter Mary Lacey Jr. all confessed to being witches. Anthony Checkley was appointed by Governor Phips to replace Thomas Newton as the Crown's Attorney when Newton took an appointment in New Hampshire.

In August, grand juries indicted George Burroughs, Mary Eastey, Martha Corey and George Jacobs Sr. Trial juries convicted Martha Carrier, George Jacobs Sr., George Burroughs, John Willard, Elizabeth Proctor, and John Proctor. Elizabeth Proctor was given a temporary stay of execution because she was pregnant. On August 19, 1692, Martha Carrier, George Jacobs Sr., George Burroughs, John Willard, and John Proctor were executed:

Mr. Burroughs was carried in a Cart with others, through the streets of Salem, to Execution. When he was upon the Ladder, he made a speech for the clearing of his Innocency, with such Solemn and Serious Expressions as were to the Admiration of all present; his Prayer (which he concluded by repeating the Lord's Prayer) [as witches were not supposed to be able to recite] was so well worded, and uttered with such composedness as such fervency of spirit, as was very Affecting, and drew Tears from many, so that if seemed to some that the spectators would hinder the execution. The accusers said the black Man [Devil] stood and dictated to him. As soon as he was turned off [hanged], Mr. Cotton Mather, being mounted upon a Horse, addressed himself to the People, partly to declare that he [Mr. Burroughs] was no ordained Minister, partly to possess the People of his guilt, saying that the devil often had been transformed into the Angel of Light. And this did somewhat appease the People, and the Executions went on; when he [Mr. Burroughs] was cut down, he was dragged by a Halter to a Hole, or Grave, between the Rocks, about two feet deep; his Shirt and Breeches being pulled off, and an old pair of Trousers of one Executed put on his lower parts: he was so put in, together with Willard and Carrier, that one of his Hands, and his Chin, and a Foot of one of them, was left uncovered.

— Robert Calef, More Wonders of the Invisible World.

=== September 1692 ===
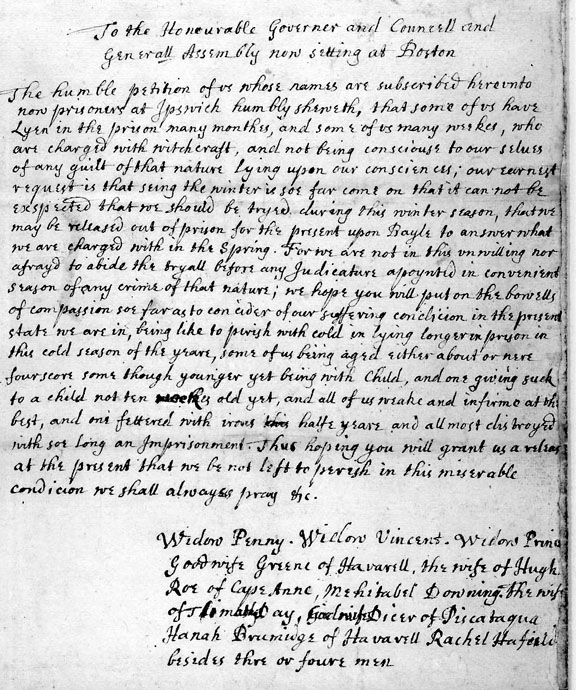
Petition for bail of eleven accused people from Ipswich, 1692

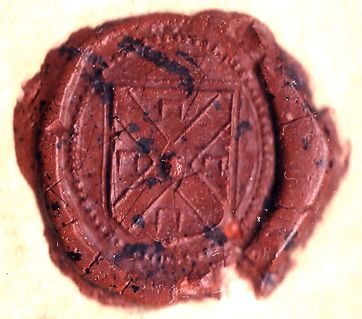
The personal seal of William Stoughton on the warrant for the execution of Bridget Bishop

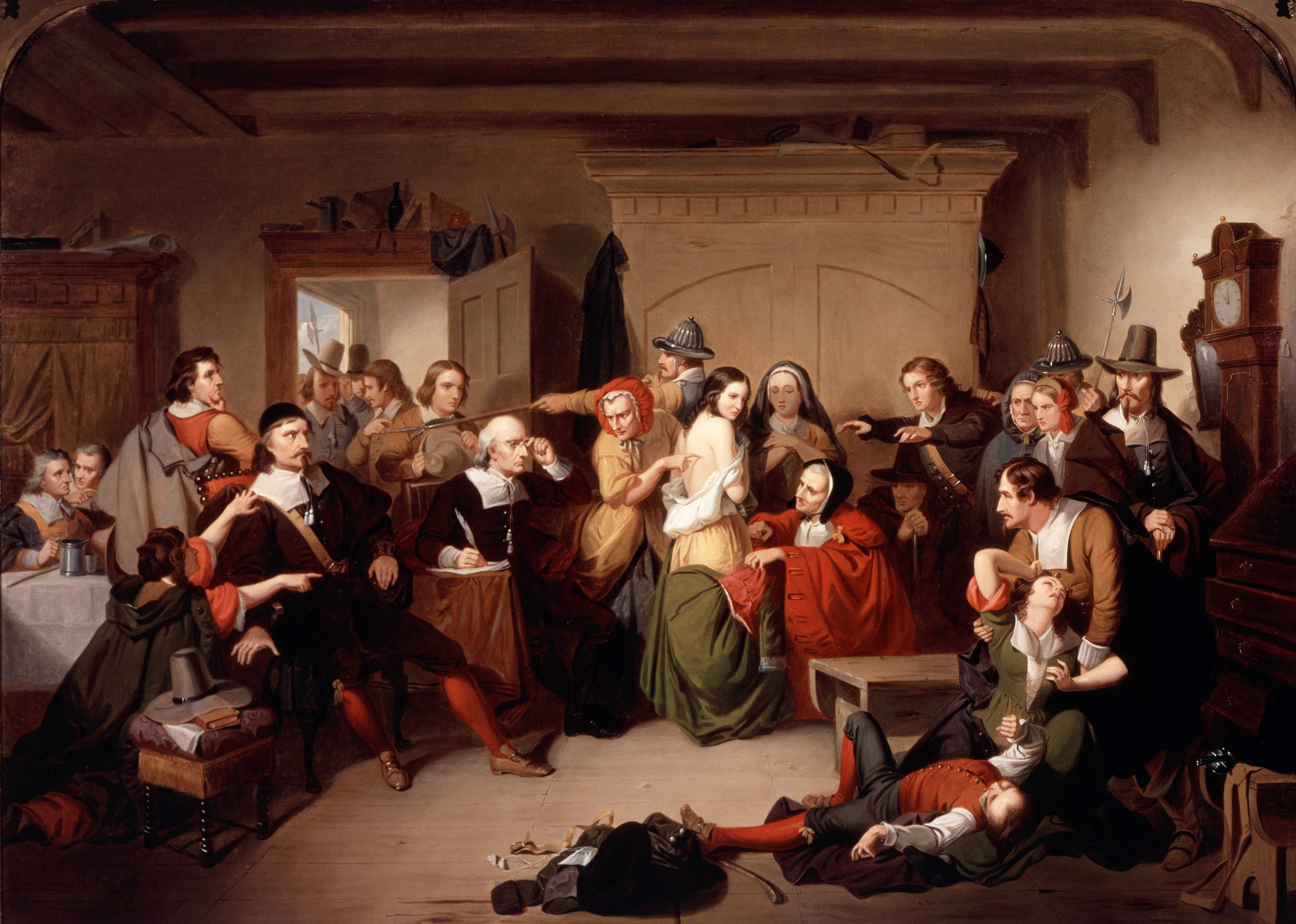
Examination of a Witch (1853) by T. H. Matteson, inspired by the Salem trials

In September, grand juries indicted 18 more people. The grand jury failed to indict William Proctor, who was re-arrested on new charges. On September 19, 1692, Giles Corey refused to plead at trial, and was killed by peine forte et dure, a form of torture in which the subject is pressed beneath an increasingly heavy load of stones, in an attempt to make him enter a plea. Four pleaded guilty and 11 others were tried and found guilty.

On September 20, Cotton Mather wrote to Stephen Sewall: "That I may be the more capable to assist in lifting up a standard against the infernal enemy", requesting "a narrative of the evidence given in at the trials of half a dozen, or if you please, a dozen, of the principal witches that have been condemned." On September 22, 1692, eight more persons were executed, "After Execution Mr. Noyes turning him to the Bodies, said, what a sad thing it is to see Eight Firebrands of Hell hanging there."

Dorcas Hoar was given a temporary reprieve, with the support of several ministers, to make a confession of being a witch. Mary Bradbury, aged 77, managed to escape with the help of family and friends. Abigail Faulkner Sr. was pregnant and given a temporary reprieve (some reports from that era say that Abigail's reprieve later became a stay of charges).

Mather quickly completed his account of the trials, Wonders of the Invisible World and it was given to Phips when he returned from the fighting in Maine in early October. Burr says both Phips' letter and Mather's manuscript "must have gone to London by the same ship" in mid-October:

I hereby declare that as soon as I came from fighting [...] and understood what danger some of their innocent subjects might be exposed to, if the evidence of the afflicted persons only did prevaile either to the committing or trying any of them, I did before any application was made unto me about it put a stop to the proceedings of the Court and they are now stopt till their Majesties pleasure be known.

— Governor Phips, Boston, October 12, 1692

On October 29, Judge Sewall wrote: "the Court of Oyer and Terminer count themselves thereby dismissed [...] asked whether the Court of Oyer and Terminer should sit, expressing some fear of Inconvenience by its fall, [the] Governour said it must fall". Perhaps by coincidence, Governor Phips' own wife, Lady Mary Phips, was among those who had been "called out upon" around this time. After Phips' order, there were no more executions.

=== Superior Court of Judicature, 1693 ===
In January 1693, the new Superior Court of Judicature, Court of Assize and General Gaol [Jail] Delivery convened in Salem, Essex County, again headed by William Stoughton as Chief Justice, with Anthony Checkley continuing as the Attorney General, and Jonathan Elatson as Clerk of the Court. Unlike its predecessor, this court "did not allow spectral evidence" to be used as evidence of guilt.

The first five cases tried in January 1693 were of the five people who had been indicted but not tried in September: Sarah Buckley, Margaret Jacobs, Rebecca Jacobs, Mary Whittredge (or Witheridge) and Job Tookey. All were found not guilty. Grand juries were held for many of those remaining in jail. Charges were dismissed against many, but 16 more people were indicted and tried, three of whom were found guilty: Elizabeth Johnson Jr., Sarah Wardwell, and Mary Post.

When Stoughton wrote the warrants for the execution of these three and others remaining from the previous court, Governor Phips issued pardons, sparing their lives. In late January/early February, the Court sat again in Charlestown, Middlesex County, and held grand juries and tried five people: Sarah Cole (of Lynn), Lydia Dustin and Sarah Dustin, Mary Taylor and Mary Toothaker. All were found not guilty but were not released until they paid their jail fees. Lydia Dustin died in jail on March 10, 1693.

At the end of April, the Court convened in Boston, Suffolk County, and cleared Capt. John Alden by proclamation. It heard charges against a servant girl, Mary Watkins, for falsely accusing her mistress of witchcraft. In May, the Court convened in Ipswich, Essex County, and held a variety of grand juries. They dismissed charges against all but five people. Susannah Post, Eunice Frye, Mary Bridges Jr., Mary Barker and William Barker Jr. were all found not guilty at trial, finally putting an end to the series of trials and executions.

== Legal procedures ==
=== Overview ===
After someone concluded that a loss, illness, or death had been caused by witchcraft, the accuser entered a complaint against the alleged witch with the local magistrates. If the complaint was deemed credible, the magistrates had the person arrested and brought in for a public examination—essentially an interrogation where the magistrates pressed the accused to confess.

If the magistrates at this local level were satisfied that the complaint was well-founded, the prisoner was handed over to be dealt with by a superior court. In 1692, the magistrates opted to wait for the arrival of the new charter and governor, who would establish a Court of Oyer and Terminer to handle these cases. The next step, at the superior court level, was to summon witnesses before a grand jury.

A person could be indicted on charges of afflicting with witchcraft, or for making an unlawful covenant with the Devil. Once indicted, the defendant went to trial, sometimes on the same day, as in the case of the first person indicted and tried on June 2, Bridget Bishop, who was executed eight days later, on June 10, 1692.

There were four execution dates, with one person executed on June 10, 1692, five executed on July 19, 1692 (Sarah Good, Rebecca Nurse, Susannah Martin, Elizabeth Howe and Sarah Wildes), another five executed on August 19, 1692 (Martha Carrier, John Willard, George Burroughs, George Jacobs Sr., and John Proctor), and eight on September 22, 1692 (Mary Eastey, Martha Corey, Ann Pudeator, Samuel Wardwell, Mary Parker, Alice Parker, Wilmot Redd and Margaret Scott).

Several others, including Elizabeth (Bassett) Proctor and Abigail Faulkner, were convicted but given temporary reprieves because they were pregnant. Five other women were convicted in 1692, but the death sentence was never carried out: Mary Bradbury (in absentia), Ann Foster (who later died in prison), Mary Lacey Sr. (Foster's daughter), Dorcas Hoar and Abigail Hobbs.

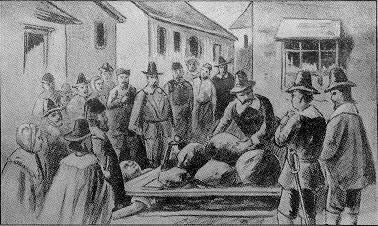
Giles Corey was pressed to death during the Salem witch trials in the 1690s in an unsuccessful attempt to force him to enter a plea

Giles Corey, an 81-year-old farmer from the southeast end of Salem (called Salem Farms), refused to enter a plea when he came to trial in September. The judges applied an archaic form of punishment called peine forte et dure, in which stones were piled on his chest until he could no longer breathe. After two days of peine fort et dure, Corey died without entering a plea. His refusal to plead is usually explained as a way of preventing his estate from being confiscated by the Crown, but, according to historian Chadwick Hansen, much of Corey's property had already been seized, and he had made a will in prison: "His death was a protest [...] against the methods of the court". A contemporary critic of the trials, Robert Calef, wrote, "Giles Corey pleaded not Guilty to his Indictment, but would not put himself upon Tryal by the Jury (they having cleared none upon Tryal) and knowing there would be the same Witnesses against him, rather chose to undergo what Death they would put him to."

As convicted witches, Rebecca Nurse and Martha Corey had been excommunicated from their churches and denied proper burials. As soon as the bodies of the accused were cut down from the trees, they were thrown into a shallow grave, and the crowd dispersed. Oral history claims that the families of the dead reclaimed their bodies after dark and buried them in unmarked graves on family property. The record books of the time do not note the deaths of any of those executed.

=== Spectral evidence ===
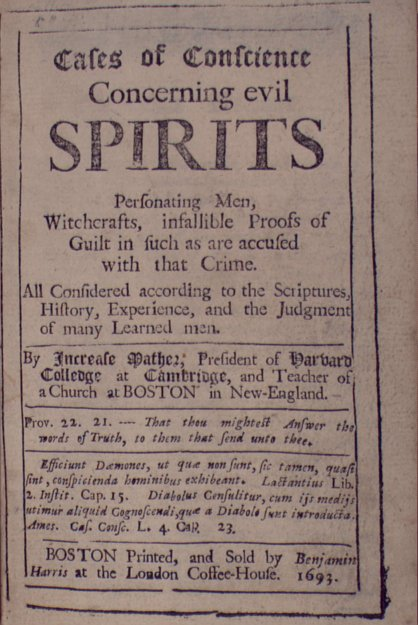
Title page of Cases of Conscience (Boston, 1693) by Increase Mather

Much, but not all, of the evidence used against the accused was spectral evidence, or the testimony of the afflicted who claimed to see the apparition or the shape of the person who was allegedly afflicting them. The theological dispute that ensued about the use of this evidence was based on whether a person had to give permission to the Devil for his or her shape to be used to afflict. Opponents claimed that the Devil was able to use anyone's shape to afflict people, but the Court contended that the Devil could not use a person's shape without that person's permission; therefore, when the afflicted claimed to see the apparition of a specific person, that was accepted as evidence that the accused had been complicit with the Devil.

Cotton Mather's The Wonders of the Invisible World was written with the purpose to show how careful the court was in managing the trials. Unfortunately the work did not get released until after the trials had already ended. In his book, Mather explained how he felt spectral evidence was presumptive and that it alone was not enough to warrant a conviction. Robert Calef, a strong critic of Cotton Mather, stated in his own book titled More Wonders of the Invisible World that by confessing, an accused would not be brought to trial, such as in the cases of Tituba and Dorcas Good.

Increase Mather and other ministers sent a letter to the Court, "The Return of Several Ministers Consulted", urging the magistrates not to convict on spectral evidence alone. The court later ruled that spectral evidence was inadmissible, which caused a dramatic reduction in the rate of convictions and may have hastened the end of the trials. A copy of this letter was printed in Increase Mather's Cases of Conscience, published in 1693. The publication A Tryal of Witches, related to the 1662 Bury St Edmunds witch trial, was used by the magistrates at Salem when looking for a precedent in allowing spectral evidence. Since the jurist Sir Matthew Hale had permitted this evidence, supported by the eminent philosopher, physician and author Thomas Browne, to be used in the Bury St Edmunds witch trial and the accusations against two Lowestoft women, the colonial magistrates also accepted its validity and their trials proceeded.

=== Witch cake ===
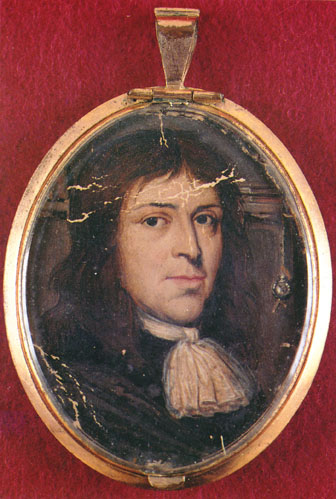
Reverend Samuel Parris

According to a March 27, 1692 entry by Parris in the Records of the Salem-Village Church, a church member and close neighbor of Rev. Parris, Mary Sibley (aunt of Mary Walcott), directed John Indian, a man enslaved by Parris, to make a witch cake. This may have been a superstitious attempt to ward off evil spirits. According to an account attributed to Deodat Lawson ("collected by Deodat Lawson") this happened around March 8, over a week after the first complaints had gone out and three women were arrested. Lawson's account describes this cake "a means to discover witchcraft" and provides other details such as that it was made from rye meal and urine from the afflicted girls and was fed to a dog.

In the Church Records, Parris describes speaking with Sibley privately on March 25, 1692, about her "grand error" and accepted her "sorrowful confession". After the main sermon on March 27, and the wider congregation was dismissed, Parris addressed covenanted church-members about it and admonished all the congregation against "going to the Devil for help against the Devil." He stated that while "calamities" had begun in his own household "it never brake forth to any considerable light, until diabolical means were used, by the making of a cake by my Indian man, who had his direction from this our sister, Mary Sibley." This doesn't seem to square with Lawson's account dating it around March 8. The first complaints were February 29 and the first arrests were March 1.

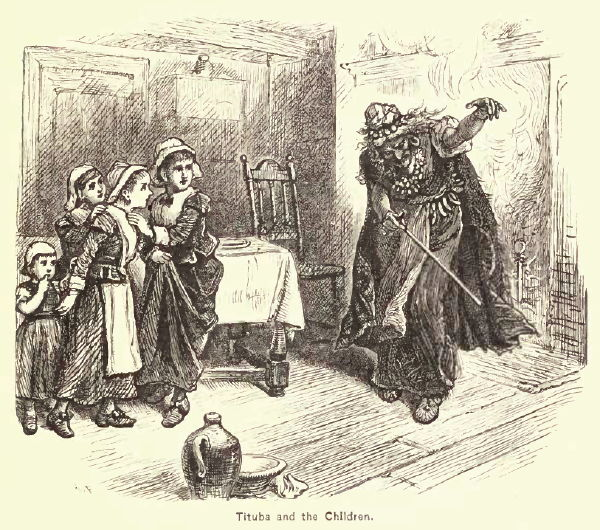
This 19th-century representation of "Tituba and the Children" by Alfred Fredericks, originally appeared in A Popular History of the United States, Vol. 2, by William Cullen Bryant (1878)

Traditionally, the allegedly afflicted girls are said to have been entertained by Parris' slave, Tituba. A variety of secondary sources, starting with Charles W. Upham in the 19th century, typically relate that a circle of the girls, with Tituba's help, tried their hands at fortune telling. They used the white of an egg and a mirror to create a primitive crystal ball to divine the professions of their future spouses and scared one another when one supposedly saw the shape of a coffin instead. The story is drawn from John Hale's book about the trials, but in his account, only one of the girls, not a group of them, had confessed to him afterward that she had once tried this. Hale did not mention Tituba as having any part of it, nor did he identify when the incident took place. But the record of Tituba's pre-trial examination holds her giving an energetic confession, speaking before the court of "creatures who inhabit the invisible world", and "the dark rituals which bind them together in service of Satan", implicating both Good and Osborne while asserting that "many other people in the colony were engaged in the devil's conspiracy against the Bay."

Tituba's race has often been described in later accounts as of Carib-Indian or African descent, but contemporary sources describe her only as an "Indian". Research by Elaine Breslaw has suggested that Tituba may have been captured in what is now Venezuela and brought to Barbados, and so may have been an Arawak Indian. Other slightly later descriptions of her, by Gov. Thomas Hutchinson writing his history of the Massachusetts Bay Colony in the 18th century, describe her as a "Spanish Indian". In that day, that typically meant a Native American from the Carolinas/Georgia/Florida.

=== Touch test ===
The most infamous application of the belief in effluvia was the touch test used in Andover during preliminary examinations in September 1692. Parris had explicitly warned his congregation against such examinations. If the accused witch touched the victim while the victim was having a fit, and the fit stopped, observers believed that meant the accused was the person who had afflicted the victim. As several of those accused later recounted:

...we were blindfolded, and our hands were laid upon the afflicted persons, they being in their fits and falling into their fits at our coming into their presence, as they said. Some led us and laid our hands upon them, and then they said they were well and that we were guilty of afflicting them; whereupon we were all seized, as prisoners, by a warrant from the justice of the peace and forthwith carried to Salem.

The Rev. John Hale explained how this supposedly worked: "the Witch by the cast of her eye sends forth a Malefick Venome into the Bewitched to cast him into a fit, and therefore the touch of the hand doth by sympathy cause that venome to return into the Body of the Witch again".

=== Other evidence ===
Other evidence included the confessions of the accused; testimony by a confessed witch who identified others as witches; the discovery of poppits (poppets), books of palmistry and horoscopes, or pots of ointments in the possession or home of the accused; and observation of what were called witch's teats on the body of the accused. A witch's teat was said to be a mole or blemish somewhere on the body that was insensitive to touch; discovery of such insensitive areas was considered de facto evidence of witchcraft.

== Primary sources and early discussion ==
Puritan ministers throughout the Massachusetts Bay Colony were exceedingly interested in the trial. Several traveled to Salem in order to gather information about the trial. After witnessing the trials first-hand and gathering accounts, these ministers presented various opinions about the trial starting in 1692.

Deodat Lawson, a former minister in Salem Village, visited Salem Village in March and April 1692. The resulting publication, entitled A Brief and True Narrative of Some Remarkable Passages Relating to Sundry Persons Afflicted by Witchcraft, at Salem Village: Which happened from the Nineteenth of March, to the Fifth of April 1692, was published while the trials were ongoing and relates evidence meant to convict the accused. Simultaneous with Lawson, William Milbourne, a Baptist minister in Boston, publicly petitioned the General Assembly in early June 1692, challenging the use of spectral evidence by the Court. Milbourne had to post £200 bond (equal to £37,159, or about US$42,000 today) or be arrested for "contriving, writing and publishing the said scandalous Papers".

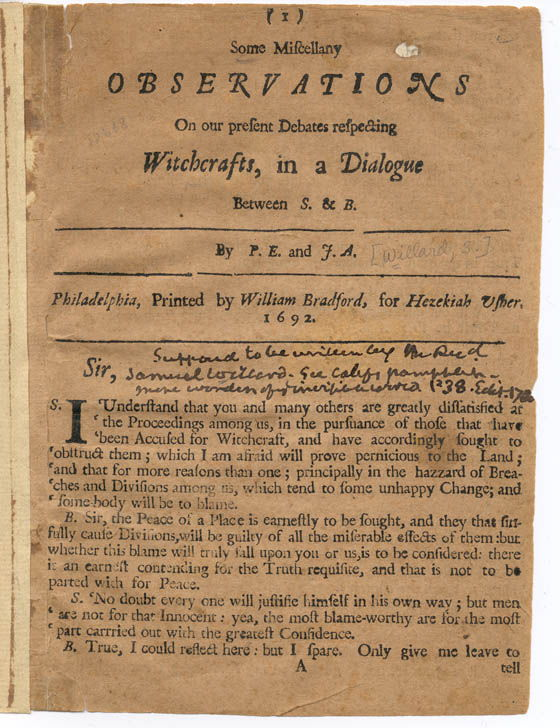
First page of "Some Miscellany Observations On our present Debates respecting Witchcrafts, in a Dialogue Between S. & B.", attributed to Samuel Willard

The most famous primary source about the trials is Cotton Mather's Wonders of the Invisible World: Being an Account of the Tryals of Several Witches, Lately Executed in New-England, printed in October 1692. This text had a tortured path to publication. Initially conceived as a promotion of the trials and a triumphant celebration of Mather's leadership, Mather had to rewrite the text and disclaim personal involvement as suspicion about spectral evidence started to build. Regardless, it was published in both Boston and London, with an introductory letter of endorsement by William Stoughton, the Chief Magistrate. The book included accounts of five trials, with much of the material copied directly from the court records, which were supplied to Mather by Stephen Sewall, a clerk in the court.

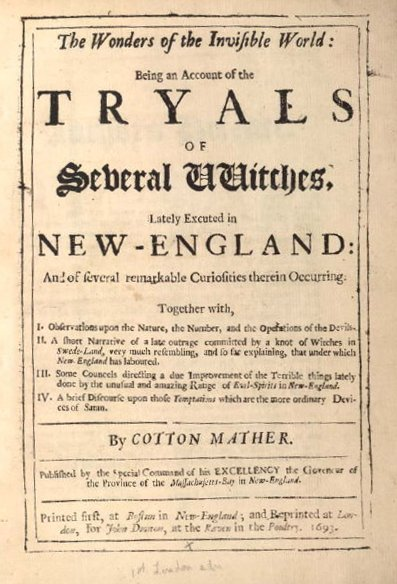
Title page of Wonders of the Invisible World (London, 1693) by Cotton Mather

Cotton Mather's father, Increase Mather, completed Cases of Conscience Concerning Evil Spirits at the same time as Wonders and published it in November 1692. This book was intended to judiciously acknowledge the growing doubts about spectral evidence, while still maintaining the accuracy of Cotton's rewritten, whitewashed text. Like his son, Increase minimized his personal involvement, although he included the full text of his August petition to the Salem court in support of spectral evidence. Judging from the apologetic tone of Cases of Conscience that the panic had subsided, Thomas Brattle directly ridiculed the "superstitions" of Salem and Increase's defense of his son in an open letter notable for its openly sarcastic tone.

Samuel Willard, minister of the Third Church in Boston was a onetime strong supporter of the trials and of spectral evidence but became increasingly concerned as the Mathers crushed dissent. Writing anonymously to conceal his dissent, he published a short tract entitled "Some Miscellany Observations On our present Debates respecting Witchcrafts, in a Dialogue Between S. & B." The authors were listed as "P. E. and J. A." (Philip English and John Alden), but the work is generally attributed to Willard. In it, two characters, S (Salem) and B (Boston), discuss the way the proceedings were being conducted, with "B" urging caution about the use of testimony from the afflicted and the confessors, stating, "whatever comes from them is to be suspected; and it is dangerous using or crediting them too far". This book lists its place of publication as Philadelphia, but it is believed to have been secretly printed in Boston.

== Aftermath and closure ==
Although the last trial was held in May 1693, public response to the events continued. In the decades following the trials, survivors and family members (and their supporters) sought to establish the innocence of the individuals who were convicted and to gain compensation. In the following centuries, the descendants of those unjustly accused and condemned have sought to honor their memories. Events in Salem and Danvers in 1992 were used to commemorate the trials. In November 2001, years after the celebration of the 300th anniversary of the trials, the Massachusetts legislature passed an act exonerating all who had been convicted and naming each of the innocent, with the exception of Elizabeth Johnson, who was cleared by the Massachusetts Senate on 26 May 2022, the last conviction to be reversed, after pressure from schoolchildren who discovered the anomaly. The trials have figured in American culture and been explored in numerous works of art, literature and film.

=== Reversals of attainder and compensation to the survivors ===
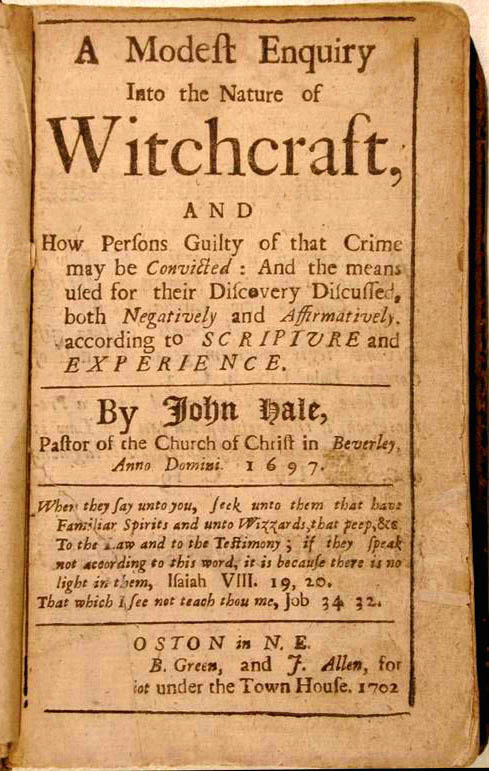
Title page of A Modest Enquiry Into the Nature of Witchcraft by John Hale (Boston, 1702)

The first indication that public calls for justice were not over occurred in 1695 when Thomas Maule, a noted Quaker, publicly criticized the handling of the trials by the Puritan leaders in Chapter 29 of his book Truth Held Forth and Maintained, expanding on Increase Mather by stating, "it were better that one hundred Witches should live, than that one person be put to death for a witch, which is not a Witch". For publishing this book, Maule was imprisoned twelve months before he was tried and found not guilty.

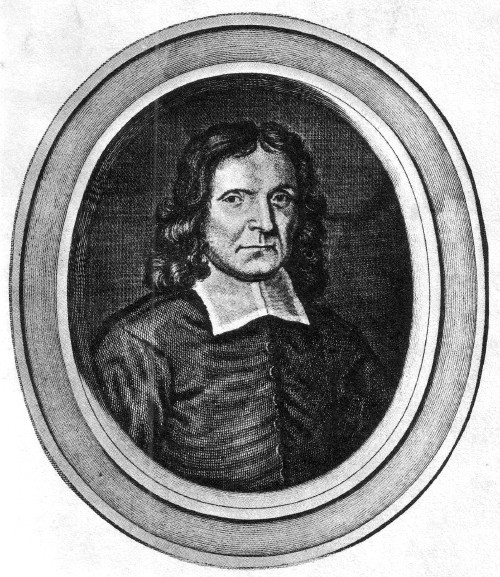
Reverend Samuel Willard

On December 17, 1696, the General Court ruled that there would be a fast day on January 14, 1697, "referring to the late Tragedy, raised among us by Satan and his Instruments." On that day, Samuel Sewall asked Rev. Samuel Willard to read aloud his apology to the congregation of Boston's South Church, "to take the Blame & Shame" of the "late Commission of Oyer & Terminer at Salem". Thomas Fiske and eleven other trial jurors also asked forgiveness.

From 1693 to 1697, Robert Calef, a "weaver" and a cloth merchant in Boston, collected correspondence, court records and petitions, and other accounts of the trials, and placed them, for contrast, alongside portions of Cotton Mather's Wonders of the Invisible World, under the title More Wonders of the Invisible World,

Calef could not get it published in Boston, and he had to take it to London, where it was published in 1700. Scholars of the trials—Hutchinson, Upham, Burr, and even Poole—have relied on Calef's compilation of documents. John Hale, a minister in Beverly who was present at many of the proceedings, had completed his book, A Modest Enquiry into the Nature of Witchcraft in 1697, which was not published until 1702, after his death, and perhaps in response to Calef's book. Expressing regret over the actions taken, Hale admitted, "Such was the darkness of that day, the tortures and lamentations of the afflicted, and the power of former presidents, that we walked in the clouds, and could not see our way."

Various petitions were filed between 1700 and 1703 with the Massachusetts government, demanding that the convictions be formally reversed. Those tried and found guilty were considered dead in the eyes of the law, and with convictions still on the books, those not executed were vulnerable to further accusations. The General Court initially reversed the attainder only for those who had filed petitions, only three people who had been convicted but not executed: Abigail Faulkner Sr., Elizabeth Proctor and Sarah Wardwell. In 1703, another petition was filed, requesting a more equitable settlement for those wrongly accused, but it was not until 1709, when the General Court received a further request, that it took action on this proposal. In May 1709, 22 people who had been convicted of witchcraft, or whose relatives had been convicted of witchcraft, presented the government with a petition in which they demanded both a reversal of attainder and compensation for financial losses.

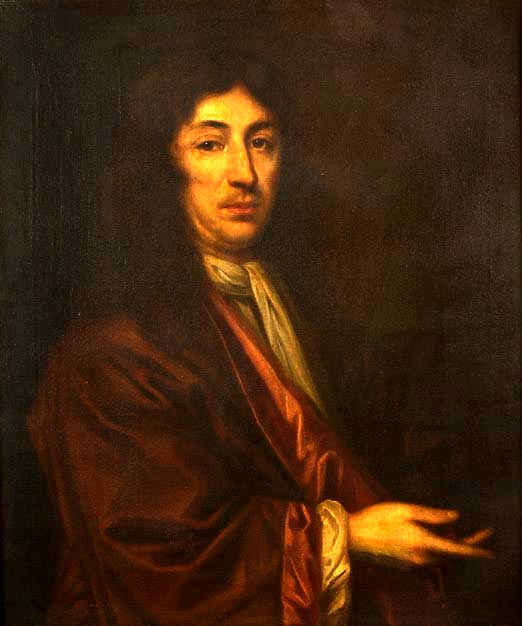
Governor of Massachusetts Joseph Dudley

Repentance was evident within the Salem Village church. Rev. Joseph Green and the members of the church voted on February 14, 1703, after nearly two months of consideration, to reverse the excommunication of Martha Corey. On August 25, 1706, when Ann Putnam Jr., one of the most active accusers, joined the Salem Village church, she publicly asked forgiveness. She claimed that she had not acted out of malice, but had been deluded by Satan into denouncing innocent people, mentioning Rebecca Nurse, in particular, and was accepted for full membership.

On October 17, 1711, the General Court passed a bill reversing the judgment against the twenty-two people listed in the 1709 petition (there were seven additional people who had been convicted but had not signed the petition, but there was no reversal of attainder for them). Two months later, on December 17, 1711, Governor Joseph Dudley authorized monetary compensation to the 22 people in the 1709 petition. The amount of £578 12s was authorized to be divided among the survivors and relatives of those accused, and most of the accounts were settled within a year, but Phillip English's extensive claims were not settled until 1718. Finally, on March 6, 1712, Rev. Nicholas Noyes and members of the Salem church reversed Noyes' earlier excommunications of Rebecca Nurse and Giles Corey.

=== Memorials ===
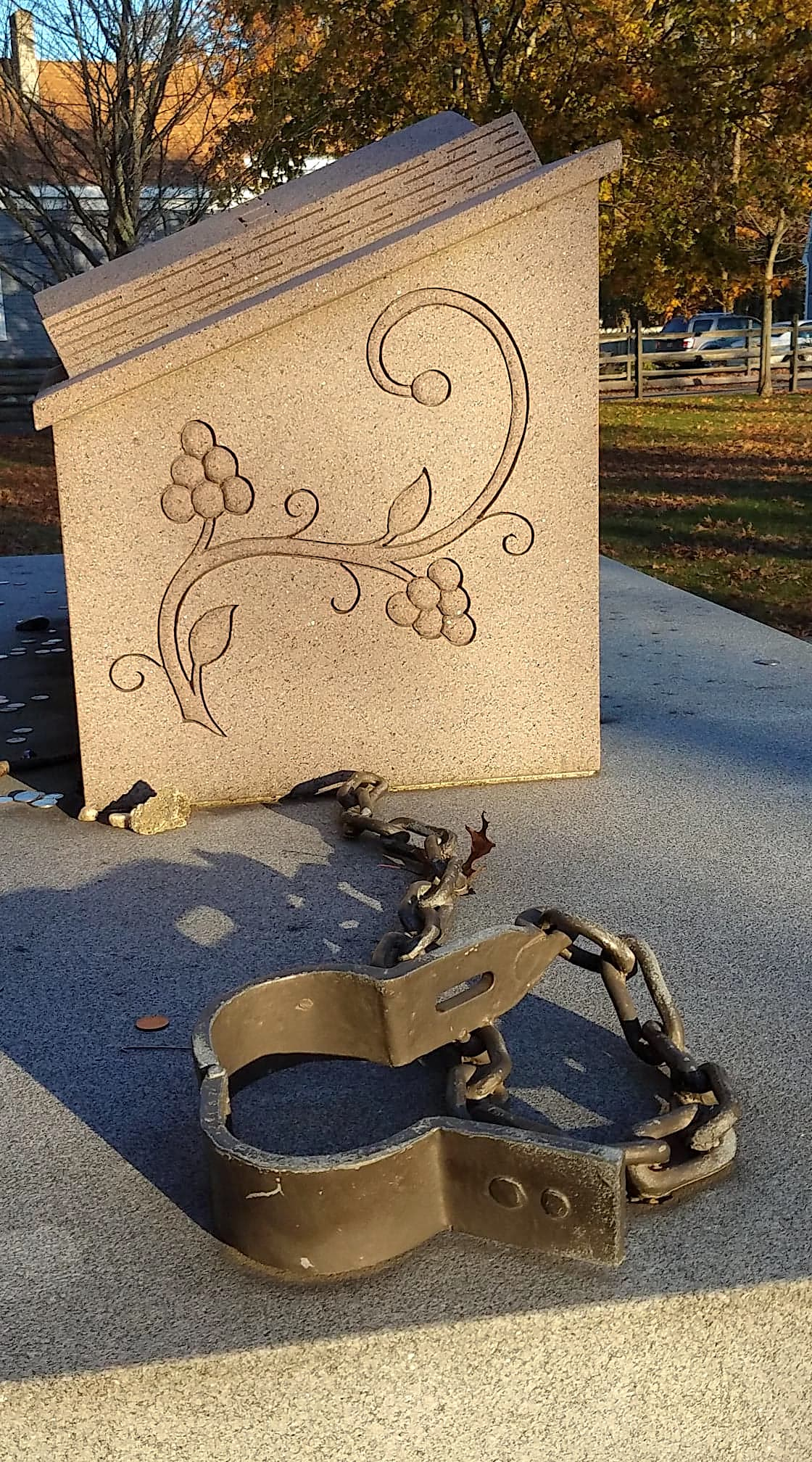
Part of the memorial for the victims of the 1692 withcraft trials, Danvers, Massachusetts (Salem Village)

Rebecca Nurse's descendants erected an obelisk-shaped granite memorial in her memory in 1885 on the grounds of the Nurse Homestead in Danvers, with an inscription from John Greenleaf Whittier. In 1892, an additional monument was erected in honor of forty neighbors who signed a petition in support of Nurse.

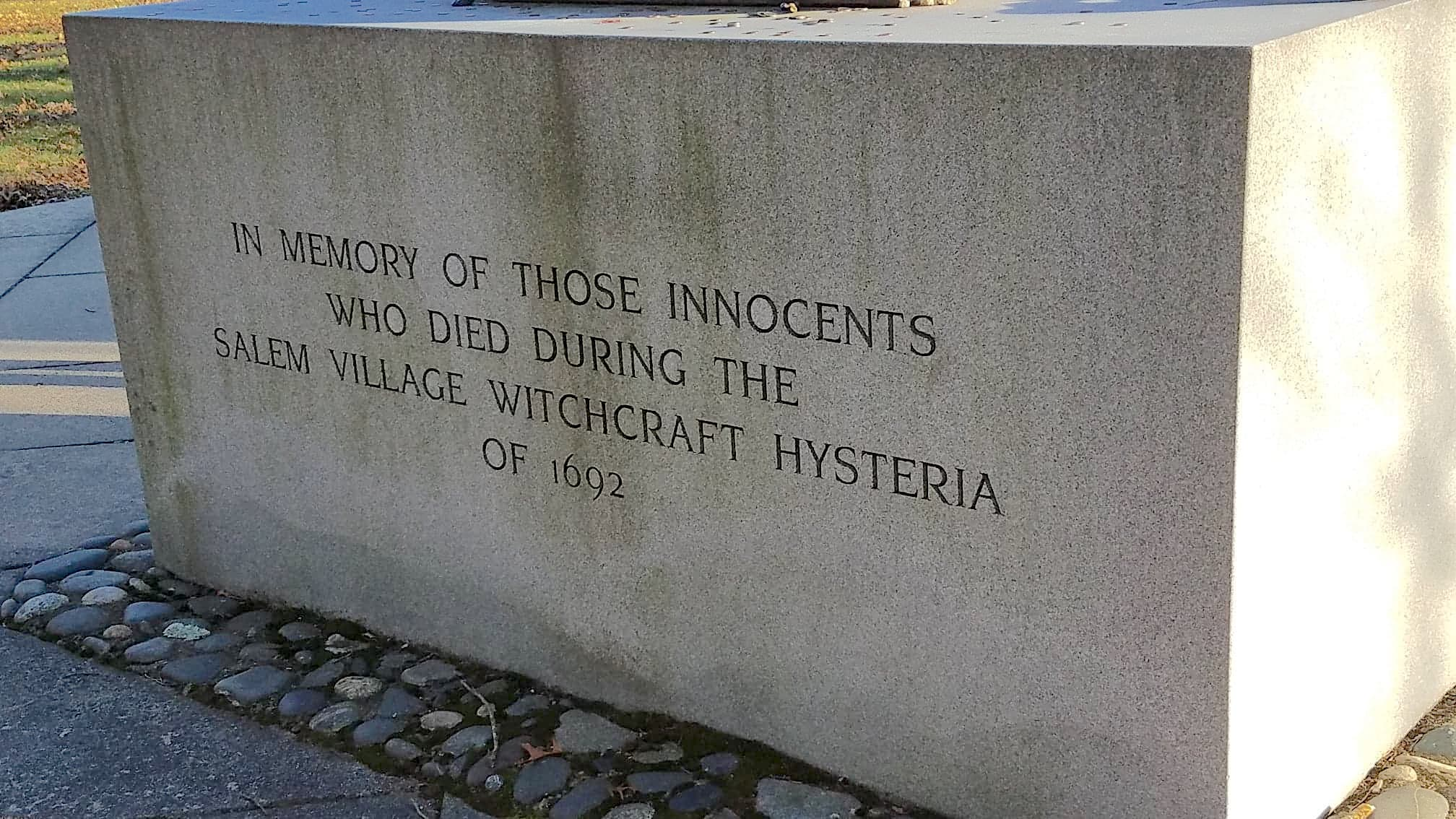
Memorial to the Victims of the Witch Trials, Principal Inscription, Danvers, Massachusetts (Salem Village)

Not all the condemned had been exonerated in the early 18th century. In 1957, descendants of the six people who had been wrongly convicted and executed but who had not been included in the bill for a reversal of attainder in 1711, or added to it in 1712, demanded that the General Court formally clear the names of their ancestral family members. An act was passed pronouncing the innocence of those accused, although it listed only Ann Pudeator by name. The others were listed only as "certain other persons", phrasing which failed specifically to name Bridget Bishop, Susannah Martin, Alice Parker, Wilmot Redd and Margaret Scott.

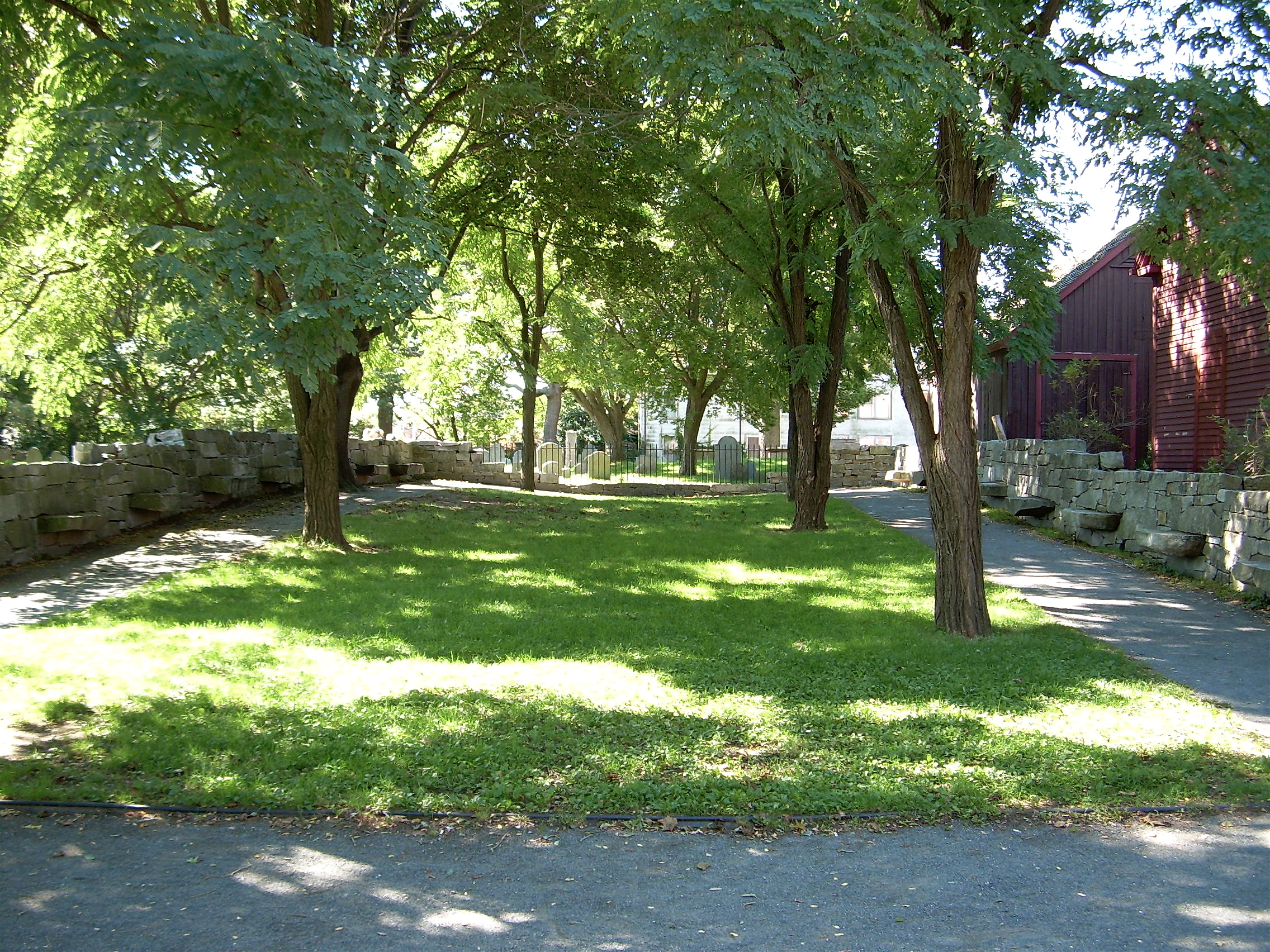
The Salem Witch Trials Memorial Park in Salem

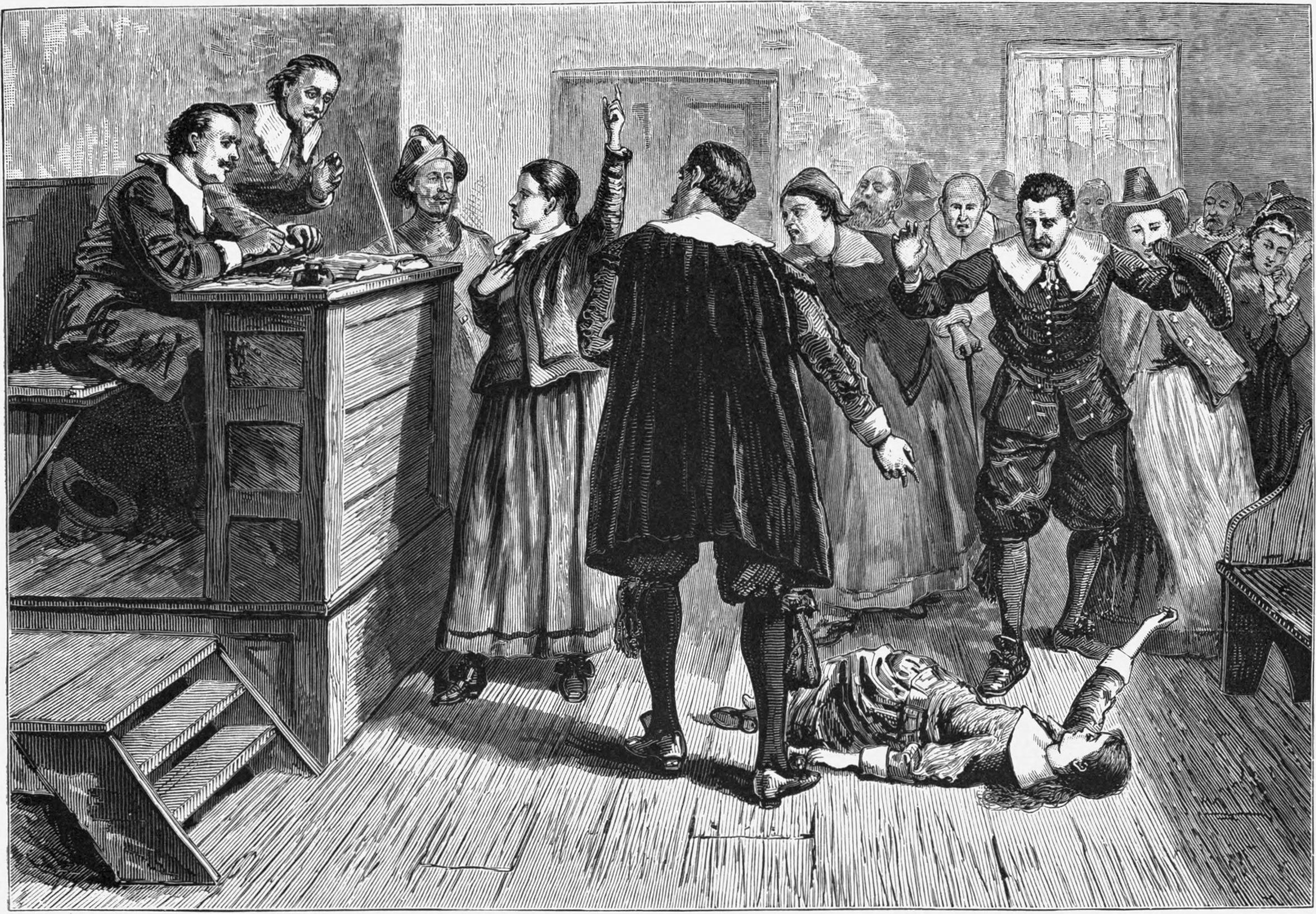
The central figure in this 1876 illustration of the courtroom is usually identified as Mary Walcott.

The 300th anniversary of the trials in 1992 was marked in Salem and Danvers by a variety of events. A memorial park was dedicated in Salem which included stone slab benches inserted in the stone wall of the park for each of those executed in 1692. Speakers at the ceremony in August included playwright Arthur Miller, whose 1953 play The Crucible had used the trials to comment on the contemporary phenomenon of McCarthyism, and Holocaust survivor and Nobel Peace Prize laureate Elie Wiesel. Danvers erected its own new memorial, and reinterred bones unearthed in the 1950s, assumed to be those of George Jacobs Sr., in a new resting place at the Rebecca Nurse Homestead.

In 1992, The Danvers Tercentennial Committee also persuaded the Massachusetts House of Representatives to issue a resolution honoring those who had died. After extensive efforts by Paula Keene, a Salem schoolteacher, state representatives J. Michael Ruane and Paul Tirone, along with others, issued a bill whereby the names of all those not previously listed were to be added to this resolution. When it was finally signed on October 31, 2001, by Governor Jane Swift, more than 300 years later, all were finally proclaimed innocent.

=== Gallows Hill and Proctor's Ledge ===
Land in the area was purchased by the city of Salem in 1936 and renamed "Witch Memorial Land" but no memorial was constructed on the site, and popular misconception persisted that the executions had occurred at the top of Gallows Hill. Rebecca Eames of Boxford, who was brought to Salem for questioning, stated that she was held at "the house below the hill" where she could see people attending executions. This helped researchers rule out the summit as the execution site. In January 2016, the University of Virginia announced its project team had determined the execution site on Gallows Hill in Salem, where nineteen "witches" had been hanged in public. Members of the Gallows Hill Project had worked with the city of Salem using old maps and documentation, as well as sophisticated GIS and ground-penetrating radar technology, to survey the area of what became known as Proctor's Ledge, located at the base of the hill, which they say was easier for spectators to reach than the top of Gallows Hill. The city owns the property and dedicated the Proctor's Ledge Memorial to the victims there in 2017. A documentary, Gallows Hill – Nineteen, is in production about these events.

== In literature, media and popular culture ==
The story of the witchcraft accusations, trials and executions has captured the imagination of writers and artists in the centuries since the event took place. Their earliest impactful use as the basis for an item of popular fiction is the 1828 novel Rachel Dyer by John Neal.

Many interpretations have taken liberties with the facts of the historical episode in the name of literary and/or artistic license—including the popular but false idea that witches in America were burned. As the trials took place at the intersection between a gradually disappearing medieval past and an emerging enlightenment, and dealt with torture and confession, some interpretations draw attention to the boundaries between the medieval and the post-medieval as cultural constructions.

== Medical theories about the reported afflictions ==
The cause of the symptoms of those who claimed affliction continues to be a subject of interest. Various medical and psychological explanations for the observed symptoms have been explored by researchers, including psychological hysteria in response to Indian attacks, convulsive ergotism caused by eating rye bread made from grain infected by the fungus Claviceps purpurea (from which LSD is derived), an epidemic of bird-borne encephalitis lethargica, and sleep paralysis to explain the nocturnal attacks alleged by some of the accusers. Some modern historians are less inclined to focus on biological explanations, preferring instead to explore motivations such as jealousy, spite, and a need for attention to explain the behavior.

== See also ==
- List of people executed for witchcraft
- List of people of the Salem witch trials
- Modern witch-hunts
- Salem witchcraft trial (1878)
- Witchcraft accusations against children
- Witch trials in England
- Witch trials in Scotland
- Colonial history of the United States
- Hanging in the United States
- List of wrongful convictions in the United States
- Moral panic

== Bibliography ==
- Adams, Gretchen A. (2008), The Specter of Salem: Remembering the Witch Trials in Nineteenth-Century America, University of Chicago Press, ISBN 978-0226005430
- Boyer, Paul S.; Nissenbaum, Stephen, eds. (1972), Salem-Village Witchcraft: A Documentary Record of Local Conflict in Colonial New England, Northeastern University Press, ISBN 978-1-55553-165-2
- Breslaw, Elaine G. (1996), Tituba, Reluctant Witch of Salem: Devilish Indians and Puritan Fantasies, NYU Press, ISBN 978-0-8147-1307-5
- Bunn, Ivan; Geiss, Gilbert (1997), Trial of Witches: A Seventeenth-Century Witchcraft Prosecution, Routledge, ISBN 978-0-415-17109-0
- Cooke, William H. (2009), Justice at Salem: Reexamining the Witch Trials, Undertaker Press, ISBN 978-1-59594-322-4, archived from the original on June 13, 2009
- Erikson, Kai T. (2005), Wayward Puritans: A Study in the Sociology of Deviance, Allyn & Bacon, ISBN 978-0-205-42403-0
- Francis, Richard (2005), Judge Sewall's Apology, Harper-Collins
- Glanvill, Joseph. "Essay IV Against modern Sadducism in the matter of Witches and Apparitions" in Essay on several important subjects in philosophy and religion, 2nd Ed, London; printed for John Baker and H. Mortlock, 1676, pp. 1–4 (in the history 201 course-pack compiled by S. McSheffrey & T. McCormick)
- Hansen, Chadwick (1969), Witchcraft at Salem, Brazillier, ISBN 978-0-8076-1137-1
- Mather, Cotton. Memorable Providence, Relating to Witchcraft and Possessions. law.umkc.edu (accessed June 5, 2010)
- Trans. Montague Summer. Questions VII & XI. "Maleus Maleficarum Part I". sacred-texts.com Archived February 23, 2011, at the Wayback Machine, June 9, 2010.
- Reis, Elizabeth (1997), Damned Women: Sinners and Witches in Puritan New England, Cornell University Press, ISBN 978-0-8014-8611-1
- Roach, Marilynne K. (2002), The Salem Witch Trials: A Day-To-Day Chronicle of a Community Under Siege, Cooper Square Press, ISBN 978-1-58979-132-9
- Robinson, Enders A. (2001) [1990], The Devil Discovered: Salem Witchcraft 1692, Hippocrene, ISBN 978-1-57766-176-4
- Sears, Donald A. (1978), John Neal, Twayne Publishers, ISBN 080-5-7723-08
- Silverman, Kenneth, ed. (1971), "Letter of Cotton Mather to Stephen Sewall, September 20, 1692", Selected Letters of Cotton Mather, University of Louisiana Press, ISBN 978-0-8071-0920-5
- Starkey, Marion L. (1949), The Devil in Massachusetts, Alfred A. Knopf, ISBN 978-0-385-03509-5
- Upham, Charles W. (2000) [1867], Salem Witchcraft, vol. 2, Dover Publications, ISBN 978-0-486-40899-6
- The Examination of Bridget Bishop, April 19, 1692. "Examination and Evidence of Some Accused Witches in Salem, 1692. law.umkc.edu (accessed June 5, 2010)
- The Examination of Sarah Good, March 1, 1692. "Examination and Evidence of Some the Accused Witches in Salem, 1692. law.umkc.edu Archived January 20, 2011, at the Wayback Machine (accessed June 6, 2010)
