= Piggen =

Piggen may refer to:

- Piggen, Virginia, United States, an unincorporated community
- Hannah Piggen (died 1785), last person executed in the United States for concealing the birth/death of an infant - see List of last executions in the United States by crime
