= Ronald Wolfe =

Ronald Wolfe may refer to:

- Ronald Wolfe (screenwriter) (1920–2011), British TV scriptwriter
- Ronald Wolfe (rapist) (died 1964), last person executed in the United States for non-homicidal rape

== See also ==
- Ron Wolf, American football general manager
- Ron DeWolfe, critic of Scientology
- Ronald de Wolf, computer scientist
