= List of people executed in the United States in 1964 =

Fifteen people, all male, were executed in the United States in 1964, eleven by electrocution, and four by gas chamber.

The last executions for the crimes of rape and robbery in the United States occurred this year, with the executions of Ronald Wolfe and James Cobern, respectively. Since Cobern, who was not tried for murder, had still killed his victim, Wolfe is the last person to be executed for a crime that did not result in the death of anyone.

James Andrew Echols became the last juvenile offender to be executed in the United States prior to Furman v. Georgia. No other juvenile offenders would be executed in the United States until Charles Rumbaugh in 1985.

== List of people executed in the United States in 1964 ==
No.	Date of execution	Name	Age of person			Gender	Ethnicity	State	Method	Ref.
No.	Date of execution	Name	At execution	At offense	Age difference	Gender	Ethnicity	State	Method	Ref.
1	January 14, 1964	Jasper Walter Pugh	34	33	1	Male	White	Georgia	Electrocution	
2	January 24, 1964	Charles Franklin Fields	32	30	2	Male	White	Arkansas	Electrocution	
3	February 12, 1964	Jesse Earl Parker	23	21	2	Male	Black	Texas	Electrocution	
4	March 6, 1964	Charles Harvey Odom	32	29	3	Male	White	Missouri	Gas chamber	
5	March 11, 1964	Bobby Clyde Bradford	32	31	1	Male	Black	Texas	Electrocution	
6	April 26, 1964	Lawrence O'Connor	26	24	2	Male	Black	Texas	Electrocution	
7	May 1, 1964	Tim Jackson	22	21	1	Male	Black	Mississippi	Gas chamber	
8	May 7, 1964	James Andrew Echols	19	17	2	Male	Black	Texas	Electrocution	
9	May 8, 1964	Ronald Lee Wolfe	33	29	4	Male	White	Missouri	Gas chamber	
10	May 12, 1964	Emmett Clark Blake	32	30	2	Male	White	Florida	Electrocution	
11	May 12, 1964	Sie Dawson	44	40	4	Male	Black	Florida	Electrocution	
12	July 30, 1964	Joseph Johnson Jr.	30	27	3	Male	Black	Texas	Electrocution	
13	August 14, 1964	John Bizup Jr.	30	26	4	Male	White	Colorado	Gas chamber	
14	September 4, 1964	James Willard Cobern	40	35	5	Male	White	Alabama	Electrocution	
15	October 16, 1964	Bernard N. Dye	34	30	4	Male	White	Georgia	Electrocution	

== Demographics ==
Gender
Male	15	100%
Female	0	0%
Ethnicity
White	8	53%
Black	7	47%
State
Texas	5	33%
Florida	2	13%
Georgia	2	13%
Missouri	2	13%
Alabama	1	7%
Arkansas	1	7%
Colorado	1	7%
Mississippi	1	7%
Method
Electrocution	11	73%
Gas chamber	4	27%
Month
January	2	13%
February	1	7%
March	2	13%
April	1	7%
May	5	33%
June	0	0%
July	1	7%
August	1	7%
September	1	7%
October	1	7%
November	0	0%
December	0	0%
Age
10–19	1	7%
20–29	3	20%
30–39	9	60%
40–49	2	13%
Total	15	100%

== Executions in recent years ==
Number of executions
1965–1967	10
1964	15
1963	21
Total	46

Preceded by 1963	List of people executed in the United States in 1964	Succeeded by 1965–1972
