= Afro-American Sentinel =

African-Nebraskan newspaper

The Afro-American Sentinel was a newspaper in Omaha, Nebraska. It was established in 1893, and ran issues until 1899. The newspaper published articles relevant to Nebraska's black community. It was strongly in favor of self-defense against lynching, and issued reports about the extent of discrimination within the city.

== Founding and end ==
The paper was established in 1893 in Omaha, Nebraska. It was primarily concerned with Nebraska's black community, and published their social and personal events, as well as church news.

Cyrus D. Bell was the editor and proprietor of the Afro-American Sentinel. Although he was reported at the time was the only person of color to publish a newspaper in the state, he was competing with The Progress owned by Ferdinand L. Barnett of Omaha. Bell used his paper to push an interstate congress and league on racial relations in 1898, where participants were to share their experiences and foster wealth.

The paper reported on a range of topics, especially during the Trans-Mississippi Exposition of 1898. They published the article "A Black Napoleon" that year, describing Dinuzulu, the king of the Zulu nation, as intelligent and leading a "great and war-like line"; this was despite the paper rarely making any comment about African affairs. They also investigated the extent to which businesses in Omaha would discriminate against African Americans, such as in hotels or lodging. The paper was a staunch critic of Booker T. Washington, particularly his message of racial reconciliation.

They also believed that the only way to stop lynching was to threaten would-be lynchers with violence: "to assure them that they will run a great risk of being compelled to bite the dust on every occasion of their entering upon such a devilish pastime". They believed that black people should take up arms, exercise self-defense, and glorified those who protected themselves through force. For example, they congratulated the 1897 group of black Floridians who took up arms to prevent a lynching in the Key West race riot: "Let colored men everywhere imitate the brave example of those in Key West, and lynching will soon become rare".

The paper closed in 1899.
