= Ronald Wolfe (rapist) =

American criminal executed for non-homicidal rape

- Wolfe on March 2, 1960
- Born: Ronald Lee Wolfe; September 3, 1930; Clarendon, New York, U.S.
- Died: May 8, 1964 (aged 33); Missouri State Penitentiary, Missouri, U.S.
- Other names: Ward Jewel Hopkins; Albert John Strouse; Jewel Karvey Hopkins
- Status: Executed by gas chamber
- Convictions: Rape; Breaking and entering Interstate transportation of a stolen vehicle Auto theft
- Penalty: Death

Ronald Lee Wolfe (September 3, 1930 – May 8, 1964) was an American habitual criminal and sex offender who became the last person executed in the United States for non-homicidal rape, and the last person to be executed for a crime where nobody died. James Cobern, who was electrocuted in Alabama the same year for robbery, had sexually mutilated and murdered his ex-girlfriend whom he robbed, but was only tried for robbery. Wolfe was also the second-to-last person executed in Missouri before the U.S. moratorium on capital punishment.

== Early life ==
Wolfe was born in Clarendon, New York. His mother left when he was two weeks old and his father left when he was 6 years old. He lived with his grandparents in his earlier years.

Wolfe had 11 prior felony convictions. His first conviction came when he was arrested for auto theft in New York at age 14 in August 1945. In 1946, he was sentenced to the New York State Vocational Institution as a juvenile delinquent. In 1951, he received a prison term at Central Prison in Raleigh, North Carolina for breaking and entering. In 1956, he was sentenced to a term at the United States Penitentiary in Atlanta, Georgia for interstate transportation of a stolen vehicle. This was his last conviction prior to his death sentence.

== Crime, trial, and execution ==
Wolfe was put to death by gas chamber on May 8, 1964. He was convicted of brutal attack of an 8-year-old girl on October 18, 1959, near Troy, Missouri, just three days after his release from federal prison. At the time of his arrest, Wolfe was also wanted for raping an 8-year-old girl in New York.

Wolfe lured the girl away from a carnival with a candy bar:

"The evidence was such as to have warranted the jury in finding the salient facts to be that about 7:30 p. m., on the evening in question, defendant, by using a candy bar, lured the child into the car he was driving, and away from the Sacred Heart Church's Fall Festival in Troy which she was attending with her parents and three sisters and a brother; he drove her some three miles into the country where he parked the car, and admittedly made repeated *12 unsuccessful attempts to ravish the child, and otherwise had shocking relations (short of penetration) with her; the car was thereafter parked within about a hundred feet of a farm house, one of the occupants of which, at about 8:30 p. m., heard the car's motor idling, and looked out the window where in the darkness she discerned an object moving away from the automobile and toward the house; upon investigation this was found to be the prosecutrix, who was taken into the home, and forthwith returned to her family at the church picnic in Troy. She was taken to a hospital at once and examined, and her condition as described by the examining physician was such as to dispel any doubt of the fact that there had been penetration and extensive damage to the affected part by tearing."

Wolfe was quickly arrested. The car he was using was determined to have been stolen. On October 26, 1959. Wolfe and a fellow inmate, William Buffington, who was awaiting trial for forging checks, escaped from prison. They stole a car, then a truck, and fled south. Wolfe was eventually recaptured in North Carolina. In 1960, he pleaded guilty to rape and was sentenced to death. After losing several rounds of appeals, the U.S. Supreme Court declined to review his case. In rejecting his appeal, the Supreme Court of Missouri quoted excerpts from his trial, including the reasoning of the judge when he sentenced him to death in spite of his guilty plea.

"The Court has considered, as dispassionately as human frailty permits, its obligation to the defendant, the prosecutrix, and more importantly, to the public. The Court has considered the element of reformation of the defendant. The record is void of any indication of basic strength of character upon which reformation could be base. The Court has considered the question of the necessary protection to be afforded the public from further depredations by the defendant. Clearly, the record here warrants a permanent separation of this defendant from all law-abiding citizens."

"The Court believes that one of the purposes of punishment is the effect it will have upon others who are inclined to commit similar offenses. By the punishment assessed in this case, the Court is speaking to them, telling them what they may expect from the law if they commit the crime of raping a child of tender years. The Court has searched the record for mitigating circumstances. The defendant sought feebly to show the use of narcotics as an excuse, but the law will not countenance one crime as an excuse for another. Instead of the record showing mitigation, it is replete with aggravation: (1) The defendant is not a youth, but is a man of maturity, both in body and mind. (2) He is not new to crime, but has a criminal record stretching back to his boyhood. He is a confirmed criminal. (3) His offense was not committed in passion but deliberately and with malice long aforethought, in a manner known by him to result in grievous injury to his victim. It was cowardly and brutal."

"The law of Missouri is the law of its people, and through their Legislature they have expressed their will that the crime of rape is punishable by imprisonment or by death. The penalty should fit the crime and should fit the defendant. Here, the crime of rape was committed in its most hideous form, upon a helpless child. Nor can the Court find anything in the character of the defendant that is deserving of the Court's mercy. So, we have here a case where both the nature of the crime and the criminality of the defendant are extreme. A review of cases in Missouri and other states shows the propriety of the extreme penalty. So, the Court feels it would be derelict in its duty in assessing anything less than the maximum penalty; and the finding of the Court as to the punishment to be assessed upon the defendant will be death in the gas chamber."

Wolfe's lawyers requested that Lieutenant Governor Hilary A. Bush, acting as governor during an absence by Governor John M. Dalton, appoint a board of inquiry to examine Wolfe's mental state. They claimed he was mentally ill and had a "psychopathic personality which impels him personality which impels him toward acts beyond his power to control." They also said he was under the influence of narcotics when he kidnapped and raped the girl. He refused, saying all of these points had already been dealt with in Wolfe's appeals. Likewise, Governor Dalton declined to grant a stay of execution, saying: "I believe he has had his day in court."

Wolfe was executed in the state's gas chamber at the Missouri State Penitentiary on May 8, 1964. He was pronounced dead at 12:12 AM. Since he had no close relatives, Wolfe was buried in a potter's field in Jefferson City.

== Aftermath ==
Wolfe's case drew nationwide attention once again in 2008 when the United States Supreme Court ruled in Kennedy v. Louisiana to ban capital punishment for child rape. The court directly cited Wolfe in court opinions.

Only one other convicted rapist would face execution for rape after Wolfe. In 1965, Clayton Dawson came within one day of execution in Tennessee. The executions of Dawson and two convicted murderers were scheduled to take place at dawn on March 21, 1965. The day before their scheduled executions, however, Governor Frank G. Clement commuted the death sentences of all five men on death row in Tennessee to 99 years imprisonment after a bill to abolish capital punishment in the state failed by a single vote in the Tennessee House of Representatives. Dawson, a black man, was a serial rapist who had been dubbed by the press as the "Foul Smelling Rapist". He was accused of robbing and raping three white women, as well as a black woman and her 16-year-old daughter, in Memphis. Dawson was sentenced to death for the rapes of his two black victims, albeit his white victims testified against him at his trial. In 1976, Dawson was released on parole after having his sentence commuted to time served by Governor Ray Blanton.

In January 1977, Dawson was arrested for raping a 19-year-old Belmont College student. On July 21, 1977, Dawson pleaded guilty to rape and was sentenced to 10 years in prison.

== See also ==
- List of people executed in Missouri
- List of people executed in the United States in 1964
- List of last executions in the United States by crime
- Robert David Bennett, an Australian habitual criminal and sex offender who became the last person to be executed for rape in Australia
