= Sie Dawson =

American day laborer

- Born: June 8, 1914; Gadsden County, Florida, US
- Died: May 18, 1964 (aged 49); Florida State Prison, Florida, US
- Occupations: Day laborer Well digger Sawmill worker
- Criminal charges: First-degree murder (2); Attempted murder
- Criminal penalty: Death
- Criminal status: Executed by electrocution
- Spouse: Marguerite Lewis (1943–1943, divorced)

Sie Dawson (June 8, 1914 (Note: Birth date also given as 1908 and 1913.) – May 12, 1964) was an American day laborer who was convicted of the April 1960 murder of 2-year-old Roger Glenn Clayton near Chattahoochee, Florida. Dawson had confessed to the crime, but repudiated his confession claiming he had been threatened into making it. He was sentenced to death, appealing his conviction unsuccessfully. Dawson, alongside Emmett C. Blake, was one of the last two individuals executed by the state of Florida before the Furman v. Georgia ruling of 1972.

== Background and crime ==
Sie Dawson was a lifelong resident of the Chattahoochee, Florida area. Dawson performed various jobs, including day labor and well digging. His right leg had been amputated above the knee and he had been diagnosed with syphilis. His primary residence was a three-room house in the Bonnie Hill area southeast of Chattahoochee. Apart from a brief marriage to Marguerite Lewis in 1943, Dawson had no known immediate family or children and was "thought of ... as a sort of harmless, aimless, amiable stray, moonshining probably, getting along somehow." Nothing much was generally known of his private life despite being "a fixture of the town." Dawson was illiterate, never learning to write even his own name.

On the morning of April 13, 1960, 36-year-old Maggie Mae Clayton left the Clayton family home with her two sons, 4-year-old Alva Donnie Clayton and 2-year-old Roger Glenn Clayton, in the Clayton family's station wagon. The trio had left to pick up Dawson, whom the Clayton family had hired to perform some work at their home and a nearby sawmill, the Wood Cellulose Production Company at River Junction. Maggie's 50-year-old husband, Alva Clayton Sr., had left the house earlier to go to the sawmill where he worked as a boiler operator before his wife and sons left to get Dawson, who lived alone. (Note: Alva Sr. also resold scrap wood from the mill to the black residents of the Happy Town neighborhood as well as moonshine to support his family.) Dawson's home was a half mile or 900 feet from the Clayton residence, on opposing sides of the same road. The Clayton family and Dawson had a close relationship which many of the town's other white residents did not approve of, with Dawson being frequently seen in the Clayton home. The group failed to return and were subsequently reported missing that same day by Alva Senior. Dawson, whose arrival at the Clayton residence by himself claiming to have not seen the trio led to the alarm being raised, took part in the search for the missing trio which continued into the night, and watched the Clayton family' three other children at their home. He also ate breakfast at the Clayton home the following morning before the search resumed.

At 6:30 AM the next day, the station wagon was discovered on a dirt road in a remote wooded area five miles south of Chattahoochee. Those present at the discovery were Alva Sr. himself, his brother-in-law Roscoe Warren, and Warren's son-in-law Obie Lee Brown. All three were found in the front seat row of the vehicle and had been noticeably beaten with gasoline on their bodies. Maggie and Roger were already deceased, and Alva was unconscious. Alva regained consciousness for a brief time not long after the trio were found, and when asked "Who hurt your mother?" by his father, he replied "Sie did it." (Note: Quote also given as "Sie did" or "Sie beat me and mama," the latter reported by deputy sheriff Robert Martin.) Furthermore, peg leg and crutch marks were observed around the abandoned vehicle; Dawson, due to having lost his lower right leg, regularly used both to transport himself. It was later determined that Maggie, who was dressed in pajamas and a housecoat, had likely also been raped. Maggie and Roger were both buried two days afterwards on April 16.

Gadsden County authorities, fearing mob violence due to racial differences as the Clayton family were white and Dawson was black, had Dawson quickly moved out of the county. Over a six-day period, Dawson was moved four times: first to the Leon County Jail in Tallahassee, further east to the former death row at the Union Correctional Institution, back west to the Taylor County Jail in Perry, northwest to the Sheriff's Bureau office back in Tallahassee, and finally back to the Leon County Jail. Dawson's whereabouts were kept undisclosed at the time. On the early morning hours of April 15, Dawson's home was destroyed by a fire suspected to be arson. During this initial phase of the investigation, Dawson denied any knowledge of the crime. On April 19, Dawson was formally charged with two counts of first-degree murder for the deaths of Maggie and Roger. The following day, Dawson made a confession to Gadsden County sheriff Otho Edwards, claiming the fatal injuries were accidental. He claimed that Maggie had begun attacking him a hammer present in the vehicle and he forcibly took from her and struck back, then striking both Roger and Alva before spilling gasoline from a can also in the vehicle onto all three; he denied any intent to strike the two sons and deliberately pouring the gasoline. At no point during these several days was he formally charged or arraigned, placed under a warrant, or permitted access to an attorney or any outside communication.

== Trial ==
On May 5, 1960, a grand jury in Quincy indicted Sie Dawson on two counts of first-degree murder for the deaths of Maggie Mae and Roger Glenn Clayton and for assault with intent to murder for the injuries inflicted on Alva Donnie Clayton.

Dawson's trial – solely for the murder of Roger – began the following month. State prosecutors presented evidence that placed Dawson at both the Clayton residence and in the vehicle with the three victims on the morning of April 13, and constable Dan Sheppard described the crutch marks found near the vehicle reportedly going "in the direction of Dawson's home." Sheppard, however, also revealed that a man and woman's footprints, with signs of a scuffle, were observed around 300 meters from the vehicle with no crutch marks there.

Dawson repudiated his confession, claiming to have forced to make it under pressure, reporting that "he would be turned over to a lynch mob" which would emasculate him by deputy sheriff Robert Martin if he did not do so. Dawson testified on his own behalf on June 24, now claiming that Alva Clayton Sr. was the actual murderer. He claimed that Alva Sr. had actually been in the vehicle as well and all five drove into the woods to retrieve several jugs of whiskey. Alva Sr. supposedly found one jug opened and having been drunk from, causing him to become enraged at his wife and begin attacking her with the hammer. Dawson claimed that he fled upon seeing the scene, explaining both the crutch marks leading away from the car and the footprints found 300 meters away; this account was also repeated by his court-appointed defense attorney, Paul Gregory. Dawson also insinuated that he and Maggie had been having an affair and that the two had drank together with Maggie "(getting) mad when she 'came looking for me and couldn't find me'." Martin acknowledged the risk of Dawson being lynched but denied making any threats to him and claimed he had advised him of his rights. State attorney William D. Hopkins did not question Dawson on the series of events he had provided, instead rereading the confession he had given while in jail at Tallahassee as well as playing a tape recording of Dawson giving the confession. Several witnesses also placed Alva Sr. at the sawmill from 6 AM to 6 PM on the day of the crime.

Later that same day the all-white jury, after deliberating for 50 or 52 minutes, found Dawson guilty with no recommendation of mercy. Such a verdict carried a mandatory death sentence. Dawson "was visibly shaken" at the verdict. Paul Gregory detested the verdict, stating "that the whole case was shot through with 'duress, fear, and compulsion' against (Dawson)" and contending that Alva Sr. was the actual perpetrator as well as no actual signs of rape having been present. Despite the conviction, many in Gadsden County (both black and white) had doubts surrounding the prosecution's narrative, including believing he had been present but not the perpetrator, that he was not sole perpetrator, or "they doubted all that he was there or had any part of it."

== Appeals and execution ==
Although Dawson's conviction did not carry a recommendation of mercy, judge Hugh Taylor postponed sentencing until a new motion of trial could be set for Dawson. Sie Dawson was ultimately sentenced to death for the murder of Roger Glenn Clayton. Dawson appealed his conviction on the grounds that his confession, since he claimed it was forced under threat of violence, was not legally valid. In March 1962, the Florida Supreme Court rejected his claims, ruling 4–3 that the confession was likely not forced. The court ruled that his interrogation "was not so long or protracted as to exhaust his resistance or destroy his will," with the majority opinion by justice Stephen O'Connell noting that he had repeated said confession when taken to the scene of the crime and again 12 days later during a lie detector test. O'Connell's opinion did not acknowledge lack of formal charges prior to the confession; another justice in the majority, Campbell Thornal, wrote a separate opinion acknowledging this, but also that "the highest court in the country has consistently declined to apply the rule as an essential of due process in state criminal proceedings." E. Harris Drew was in the minority, "(finding) ample pressures to disturb him" and writing that "the right of a free man to be presented to a sworn judicial officer promptly upon his arrest is not a technical or trivial right," even suggesting that brainwashing techniques may have been used during his interrogation. In November that same year, Dawson made a commutation request to the State Board of Pardons to be heard on December 5 which was also ultimately rejected.

From July 1963 onward, Sie Dawson and Emmett C. Blake were the only prisoners on Florida's death row. The two rarely, if ever, spoke to each other. Dawson had no visitors in prison and also avoided speaking the death row guards as well. He was described as being "tense, preoccupied, vacant, sometimes a little crazed," often covering himself with his bed sheets. Dawson was reported to have started "playing crazy," hiding under his bed while yelling that the Coast Guard was attacking him. Blake, unlike Dawson, had chosen to stop appealing his death sentence and asked governor C. Farris Bryant to sign his death warrant.

Sie Dawson was executed by electrocution at the Florida State Prison near Raiford on May 12, 1964. Dawson told death row guard Sgt. J. C. Fletcher the night before that he had a stomach ache for the past eight years, to which Fletcher replied "Well, they'll cure it in the morning, Sie." He was the second of two condemned men executed that day, following Emmett C. Blake by 29 minutes; Blake had asked to be executed first and Dawson did not object. Dawson made no final statement and was pronounced dead at 9:18 AM.

== Aftermath ==
Emmett C. Blake and Sie Dawson became the last two individuals to be executed by the state of Florida before the Furman v. Georgia ruling of 1972, in which the Supreme Court declared capital punishment unconstitutional under the cruel and unusual punishment clause of the eighth amendment. As a result, discussion surrounding their respective cases regained attention in 1977 after the Gregg v. Georgia ruling the year prior overturned Furman and restored capital punishment. Many publications discussed the questions surrounding Dawson's guilt as an illiterate black man tried and convicted by an all-white jury. Alva Donnie Clayton was interviewed by St. Petersburg Times reporter Dudley Clendinen in September 1977. Donnie, then living in Apalachicola and working in the local fishing industry, claimed that Dawson had instructed Maggie to drive into the woods before forcibly pulling her into the backseat of the vehicle and murdering her, after which he forced Donnie and Roger to pick flowers nearby for her and drove the station wagon to a nearby black-owned store before attacking him and his younger brother back in the woods. He did not specifically recall if Dawson had raped Maggie or not but did not rule out the possibility.

== See also ==
- List of people executed in Florida (pre-1972)
- List of people executed in the United States in 1964
- Race and capital punishment in the United States

== Sources ==
Caregory:African-American people in Florida
