= List of people executed in Florida (pre-1972) =

The following is a list of people executed by the U.S. state of Florida (or in Florida prior to statehood) before 1972, when capital punishment was briefly abolished by the Supreme Court's ruling in Furman v. Georgia. For people executed by Florida after capital punishment was restored by the Supreme Court's ruling in Gregg v. Georgia (1976), see List of people executed in Florida.

== Hanging ==
=== Before 1822 ===
Executions by firing squad

Name	Race	Age	Date of execution	County	Crime	Victim(s)	Governor
Hannon	White		1769	St. Johns	Murder	His wife and child, white	James Grant
Unknown	White		January 16, 1769	St. Johns (Note: Crime committed at an unspecified location on the St. Johns River.)	Murder-Robbery	Male, Native American	James Grant
Charles Holmes	White		May 1774	Escambia (Note: Crime committed at an unspecified location on the Mississippi River.)	Murder-Robbery	Five people, white and black (Note: Three French men and two black men.)	Peter Chester
Innis Hooper	White		May 1774	Escambia	Murder-Robbery	Five people, white and black	Peter Chester
Alexander Arbuthnot	White		April 1818	Wakulla (Military)	Sabotage	N/A	José María Callava
Robert Ambrister	White	21	April 1818	Wakulla (Military)	Sabotage	N/A	José María Callava

=== 1822–1845 ===
In 1822, the Legislative Council declared murder, rape, and arson to be capital crimes. During this period, executions were carried out by hanging locally in the county where the defendants were convicted. From 1847 to 1872, executions were required to be public, but were mostly moved to jail facilities afterwards. County sheriffs were also required to act as executioners.

Slave executions

Name	Race	Age	Date of execution	County	Crime	Victim(s)	Governor
John Carral	White		January 27, 1826	Jackson	Murder	Elvira Northrop, white	William Pope Duval
Benjamin Donica	White		June 20, 1827	Escambia	Murder	Saunders Donoho, white	William Pope Duval
Edward Sinclair	White		August 28, 1828	St. Johns	Murder	John Stafford, white	William Pope Duval
Andrew Crail	White		March 30, 1829	Escambia	Murder	Anne Walker, white	William Pope Duval
Norman Sherwood	White		December 10, 1830	Monroe	Murder	John Wilson, white	William Pope Duval
Robert Breen	White		December 20, 1833	Escambia	Murder	Peter Alba, white (mayor)	William Pope Duval
Waters	White		December 19, 1835	Duval	Murder	No information	John Eaton
Samuel Right	White	39	June 12, 1837	St. Johns	Murder	No information	Richard K. Call
Henry	Black		December 28, 1838	Escambia	Murder	Dr. John Parker, white (owner)	Richard K. Call
Lewis	Black		December 28, 1838	Escambia	Murder	Dr. John Parker, white (owner)	Richard K. Call
Unknown	White		April 10, 1840	Escambia	Mutiny	N/A	Robert R. Reid
James Grier	White		June 1, 1842	Alachua	Murder	No information	Richard K. Call
Chandler Hastings	White		June 1, 1842	Alachua	Murder	No information	Richard K. Call
Thomas Horan	White		March 1842	Leon	Murder	No information	Richard K. Call
George Everhart	White		June 16, 1843	Wakulla	Murder	Female, white (wife)	Richard K. Call

=== 1845–1861 ===
Name	Race	Age	Date of execution	County	Crime	Victim(s)	Governor
Alvin Flowers	White		October 2, 1846	Gadsden	Murder-Mail Robbery	Male, white (mail driver)	William Dunn Moseley
John Black	White		October 2, 1846	Gadsden	Murder-Mail Robbery	Male, white (mail driver)	William Dunn Moseley
Thomas Smith	White		October 2, 1846	Gadsden	Murder-Mail Robbery	Male, white (mail driver)	William Dunn Moseley
Unknown	White		October 2, 1846	Gadsden	Murder-Mail Robbery	Male, white (mail driver)	William Dunn Moseley
Unknown	White		October 2, 1846	Gadsden	Murder-Mail Robbery	Male, white (mail driver)	William Dunn Moseley
Charles Holeman	White		October 2, 1846	Gadsden	Murder-Mail Robbery	Male, white (mail driver)	William Dunn Moseley
Multiple unknowns	White		1848	Leon	Slave Stealing	No information	William Dunn Moseley
Celia (Note: Only woman executed in Florida before Furman.)	Black		September 22, 1848	Duval	Murder (Note: Jury found her guilty only of manslaughter and recommended clemency; judge ignored. Prominent citizens in Jacksonville also supported this and Moseley ordered a sentence suspension to study case, but ultimately chose not to act.)	Jacob Bryan, white (owner)	William Dunn Moseley
Thomas Holten	White	18	December 1848	Jefferson	Murder	Mr. Stafford, white	William Dunn Moseley
Simon	Black		December 1848	Jefferson	Murder	No information	William Dunn Moseley
Green	Black		December 1, 1848	Gadsden	Murder	Andrew, black	William Dunn Moseley
Arnold	Black		1850	Calhoun	Murder	Widow Burgess, white (owner)	Thomas Brown
Redding Evans	White	32	December 2, 1850	Jefferson	Slave Stealing	Rose, black (girlfriend)	Thomas Brown
Abram	Black		June 11, 1852	Columbia	Murder	No information	Thomas Brown
Joe	Black		December 16, 1853	Calhoun	Murder	No information	James E. Broome
Simon	Black		October 1856	Alachua	Attempted murder	No information	James E. Broome
Jack	Black		December 12, 1856	Santa Rosa	Rape	No information	James E. Broome
George Buckley	White		December 16, 1859	Hillsborough	Murder	George Goodwin, white (father-in-law)	Madison S. Perry
Allen	Black		1860	Marion	Murder	Dr. William Keitt, white	Madison S. Perry
Lewis	Black		February 1860	Marion	Murder	Dr. William Keitt, white	Madison S. Perry
Ferdinand McGaskill	White		October 12, 1860	Escambia	Murder	George Young, white	Madison S. Perry

=== Civil War ===
The following executions took place from January 10, 1861, to June 25, 1868, when Florida seceded to the Confederacy during the Civil War.

Name	Race	Age	Date of execution	County	Crime	Victim(s)	Governor
John Ammons	White	26	1861 or 1862	Holmes	Murder	Samuel McQuage, white	John Milton
George Andrews	White		February 13, 1861	Sumter	Murder	Mr. McHenry and Mr. Condray, white	John Milton
Two unknowns	Black		May 15, 1861	Duval	Murder	Richard Plumber, white	John Milton
James Thompson	White	28	February 7, 1864	Nassau (Military)	Desertion	N/A	John Milton
James Wilson	White	25	February 7, 1864	Nassau (Military)	Desertion	N/A	John Milton
John W. Cook	Black	23	February 18, 1864	Duval (Military)	Rape	Sarah Hammond, white (Note: A fourth soldier, Wallace Baker, participated in the gang rape of Sarah Hammond, but was not executed for the crime. However, he was shot for mutiny on June 18, 1864.)	John Milton
John M. Smith	Black	21	February 18, 1864	Duval (Military)	Rape	Sarah Hammond, white	John Milton
Spencer Lloyd	Black	21	February 18, 1864	Duval (Military)	Rape	Sarah Hammond, white	John Milton
Peter Goodrich	White	23	February 27, 1864	Nassau (Military)	Desertion	N/A	John Milton
William Walker	Black	23	March 1, 1864	Duval (Military)	Mutiny	N/A	John Milton
Henry Miller	White	26	April 17, 1864	Duval (Military)	Desertion	N/A	John Milton
Henry Hamilton	Black	23	November 4, 1864	Monroe (Military)	Mutiny	N/A	John Milton
John Rouxey	White		September 3, 1864	? (Military)	Murder	Jerome Supay, white	John Milton
Darius Stokes	Black	23	December 16, 1864	Monroe (Military)	Murder	John Waugh, white	John Milton
J. R. Brannon	White		March 25, 1865	Leon (Military)	Desertion-Sabotage	N/A	John Milton
William Strickland	White		March 25, 1865	Leon (Military)	Desertion-Sabotage	N/A	John Milton
David Craig	Black	21	December 1, 1865	Nassau (Military)	Mutiny	N/A	Abraham K. Allison
Joseph Green	Black		December 1, 1865	Nassau (Military)	Mutiny	N/A	Abraham K. Allison
Thomas Plowder	Black	44	December 1, 1865	Nassau (Military)	Mutiny	N/A	Abraham K. Allison
James Allen	Black	23	December 1, 1865	Nassau (Military)	Mutiny	N/A	Abraham K. Allison
Howard Thomas	Black	19	December 1, 1865	Nassau (Military)	Mutiny	N/A	Abraham K. Allison
Nathaniel Joseph	Black	20	December 1, 1865	Nassau (Military)	Mutiny	N/A	Abraham K. Allison
Gabe Ziegler	Black	20	November 2, 1866	Gadsden	Murder	Jesse Dickson, white (Quincy city marshal)	David S. Walker
Lewis Ziegler	Black		November 2, 1866	Gadsden	Murder	Jesse Dickson, white (Quincy city marshal)	David S. Walker
Sam Ziegler	Black		November 2, 1866	Gadsden	Murder	Jesse Dickson, white (Quincy city marshal)	David S. Walker
Old Booker	Black		November 2, 1866	Gadsden	Murder	Jesse Dickson, white (Quincy city marshal)	David S. Walker
Guilford Register	White	18	April 19, 1867	Putnam	Murder	William Stevens, white (sheriff)	David S. Walker

=== 1868–1879 ===
Name	Race	Age	Date of execution	County	Crime	Victim(s)	Governor
Abraham King	Black		June 11, 1869 (Note: Presumed execution; no appeals noted and other defendant later executed.)	Madison	Murder	Jacob Davis, white	Harrison Reed
Turner Woods	Black		July 3, 1869	Madison	Murder	Jacob Davis, white	Harrison Reed
John Freeman	White		November 19, 1869	Santa Rosa	Murder	Andrew Miller, white	Harrison Reed
William Scott	White		October 27, 1871	Duval	Murder-Robbery	Three people, white (Note: Rosa Carlin and two young daughters of Mr. and Mrs. Fagan.)	Harrison Reed
Robert Brown	Black		May 17, 1872	Marion	Murder	Mr. and Mrs. Neil Ferguson, white	Harrison Reed
Moses Greene	Black		May 17, 1872	Marion	Murder	Mr. and Mrs. Neil Ferguson, white	Harrison Reed
Andrew Spright	Black		May 17, 1872	Marion	Murder	Mr. and Mrs. Neil Ferguson, white	Harrison Reed
Jason Jackson	Black		December 27, 1872	Nassau	Murder	Male, white	Harrison Reed
Marshall Morris	Black		February 21, 1873	Jefferson	Murder	John Jones, race unknown	Ossian B. Hart
Lemuel Hughes	?		December 26, 1873	Hernando	Murder	Dennis Mayo, race unknown	Ossian B. Hart
William Keen	White		February 27, 1874	Duval	Murder-Robbery	William Valentine, white	Ossian B. Hart
Jack Johnson	Black		March 26, 1875	Duval	Murder	William Moses, white	Marcellus Stearns
James Munroe	Black		May 14, 1875	Alachua	Murder	Mrs. Smith, white	Marcellus Stearns
Lloyd Brown	Black		February 4, 1876	Duval	Murder	Elsie Brown, black (wife)	Marcellus Stearns
James Rawls	White		March 1, 1878	Levy	Murder	Thomas McNair, white	George Franklin Drew
Samuel Johnson	Black		May 24, 1878	Escambia	Murder-Rape	Louisa Lorrey, <10, race unknown	George Franklin Drew
Samuel Godwin	Black		September 17, 1878	Suwannee (Note: Change of venue from Lafayette County.)	Murder	Mathew Boseman, black	George Franklin Drew
Morgan Patrick	Black		September 17, 1878	Suwannee	Murder	Mathew Boseman, black	George Franklin Drew

=== 1880s ===
Name	Race	Age	Date of execution	County	Crime	Victim(s)	Governor
Wiley Smith	Black		January 9, 1880	Hamilton	Murder	Washington Jenkins, black	George Franklin Drew
Mack Hendricks	Black		May 28, 1880	Madison	Murder	Solomon Woodfield, white	George Franklin Drew
Henry Stokes	White		July 23, 1880	Orange	Murder	Lovely Glisson, white (fiancee)	George Franklin Drew
Andrew Fell	Black	40	April 22, 1881	Jefferson	Murder	Mr. J. Whitaker, white	William D. Bloxham
Benjamin Bird	Black		August 12, 1881	Duval	Murder	Joe Nelson, black (police officer)	William D. Bloxham
Morris Metzger	White		September 26, 1881	Brevard	Murder-Robbery	Samuel Moore, elderly, white (Note: Possible serial killer; claimed to have killed at least seven men (unknown if including this murder or not), however the veracity of this claim is disputed.)	William D. Bloxham
Merrick Jackson	Black		August 4, 1882	Nassau	Murder	John Thomas, black	William D. Bloxham
Harrison Carter	Black		August 4, 1882	Duval	Murder	Lewis Adams, black	William D. Bloxham
John Lee	Black		May 4, 1883	Alachua	Murder	C. P. Crockett, white	William D. Bloxham
Jose Recio	Hispanic		June 13, 1884	Monroe	Murder	Valentine Urria, Hispanic (Note: Serial killer, denied committing this murder but admitted to killing three Spaniards in Cuba.)	William D. Bloxham
Joe Williams	Black		December 19, 1884	Holmes	Murder	T. W. Cannon, white	William D. Bloxham
Noah Taylor	Black	24	January 2, 1885	Marion	Murder	Jake Grambling, white (deputy sheriff)	William D. Bloxham
James Walker	Black		April 30, 1886	St. Johns	Murder	Charles Harper, black	Edward A. Perry
Joseph Drayton	Black		June 5, 1886	Orange (Note: Drayton's crime was committed in present-day Osceola County.)	Murder	Mr. Gibson, white (Kissimmee city marshal)	Edward A. Perry
Arthur Williams	Black		June 5, 1886	Orange	Murder-Rape	Amanda Reynolds, 29, white	Edward A. Perry
John Hardy	Black	70	July 15, 1886	Alachua	Murder	Ned Brown, black	Edward A. Perry
Major Robinson	Black	37	July 31, 1886	Duval	Rape	Mary Gadsden, black	Edward A. Perry
Sherman Davis	Black	18	August 12, 1886	Hernando	Murder	Solomon Taylor, black	Edward A. Perry
Enoch Carter	Black		March 12, 1887	Orange	Murder	L. D. Beasley, white (police officer)	Edward A. Perry
Levy Peterson	Black		July 9, 1887	Marion	Murder-Robbery	Reuben Stark, white	Edward A. Perry
Henry Wiggins	Black	20	July 23, 1887	Putnam	Murder	W. P. Porter, white	Edward A. Perry
William Cooper	Black		July 30, 1887	Monroe	Murder	Liverpool Bain and George Hudson, black	Edward A. Perry
Jeff Lowe	Black	23	February 28, 1888	Escambia	Murder	Henry Smith, white	Edward A. Perry
Alexander Jones Jr.	Black		April 28, 1888	Leon	Murder	George Cuthbert, black (Note: Was also indicted for a second murder which he denied committing.)	Edward A. Perry
George Pritchett	Black		June 23, 1888	Nassau	Murder-Robbery	Henry Fusher, 60, black	Edward A. Perry
Unknown	?		1889	Hernando	?	No information	Perry or Fleming
William Gaskins	Black	51	August 1, 1889	Volusia	Murder	Tena Gaskins, black (wife)	Francis P. Fleming
Bill Westmoreland	Black	25	August 15, 1889	Duval	Murder	Annie Westmoreland, black (wife)	Francis P. Fleming

=== 1890s ===
Name	Race	Age	Date of execution	County	Crime	Victim(s)	Governor
Rivers Love	White		April 2, 1890	Madison	Murder	Thomas Braswell, elderly, white	Francis P. Fleming
Kelly Stewart	Black		July 31, 1890	Suwannee	Murder	John Hawkins, white	Francis P. Fleming
Napoleon White	Black		September 23, 1890	Leon	Murder	Martha Ann White, black (wife) (Note: Had just been released from the state penitentiary after serving a term for the previous murder of young black boy.)	Francis P. Fleming
Monroe Clark	Black		December 31, 1890	Putnam	Murder	Pierce Carroll, white	Francis P. Fleming
Richard White	Black		March 12, 1891	Leon	Murder	George Hudson, black (Note: Also convicted of murdering a woman known only as "Rabbit".)	Francis P. Fleming
Matt Armstead	Black	19	May 5, 1891	Gadsden	Murder	Charles Armstead, black (father)	Francis P. Fleming
Daniel Killens	Black		January 21, 1892	Orange	Murder	Margaret Welton, black	Francis P. Fleming
Preston Nighton	Black		November 8, 1893	Santa Rosa	Murder	Alice Blake, black (mistress)	Henry L. Mitchell
John Tharp	White		December 20, 1893	Franklin	Murder	George Knight, white	Henry L. Mitchell
Ed Dalsy	Black		January 11, 1894	Marion	Murder	J. George Binnocker, white (deputy sheriff)	Henry L. Mitchell
Johnnie Williams	Black		January 25, 1894	Marion	Murder	N. A. Chandler, white	Henry L. Mitchell
Jerry Olive	Black		September 19, 1894	Jackson	Murder	Molly Olive, black (wife)	Henry L. Mitchell
Alexander Simms	Black		July 9, 1895	Duval	Murder	Edward F. Minor, white (police officer) (Note: Murdered Minor while resisting arrest for the previous murder of another black man in a barroom.)	Henry L. Mitchell
Henry Brown	Black		July 17, 1895	Suwannee	Murder	Henry Ryberg, white	Henry L. Mitchell
George Mitchell	Black		August 2, 1895	Suwannee	Murder	Henry Ryberg, white	Henry L. Mitchell
Grant Griffin	Black	41	April 10, 1895	Alachua	Murder	William Tibbs, black	Henry L. Mitchell
Joseph Norton	White	33	September 3, 1895	Hamilton	Murder	James Denmark, white	Henry L. Mitchell
Mike Stevens	Black		September 18, 1895	Suwannee	Murder	Henry Ryberg, white	Henry L. Mitchell
William Lattimer	Mixed (Note: Mulatto.)	20	January 13, 1897	Marion	Murder	J. T. Greenlee, white	William D. Bloxham
Albert Gunn	Black		September 2, 1897	Citrus	Murder	Jeff Scott, black (Note: Serial killer, had killed seven other persons prior to this.)	William D. Bloxham
Robert Henry	Black		September 2, 1897	Duval	Murder	Mary Henry, black (wife)	William D. Bloxham
Sylvanus Johnson	Black	19	September 13, 1897	Monroe	Rape	Maggie Atwell, white	William D. Bloxham
Enoch Doyle	Black		September 16, 1897	Duval	Rape	Priscilla Youmans, black	William D. Bloxham
General Hollens	Black		December 10, 1897	Clay	Murder	Mary Hollens, black (wife)	William D. Bloxham
Harry Singleton	Black		January 8, 1898	Hillsborough	Murder	Jack McCormick, white (Tampa police officer)	William D. Bloxham
Richard James	Black		February 18, 1898	Alachua	Murder	Sallie James, black (wife)	William D. Bloxham
Edward Heinson	Black		July 6, 1898	Duval	Rape	Ida Bailey, 14, white	William D. Bloxham
Babe Redford	Mixed (Note: Mulatto.)	30	July 10, 1898	Levy	Murder	Henry Hayes, black	William D. Bloxham
Jonah Green	Black		January 11, 1899	Santa Rosa	Murder	Sally Brown, black	William D. Bloxham
George Canty	White		March 17, 1899	Leon	Murder	Jack Holloway, white	William D. Bloxham
Sherman Copeland	Black	35	November 9, 1899	Orange	Murder	Mary Cook, 22, black	William D. Bloxham

=== 1900s ===
Name	Race	Age	Date of execution	County	Crime	Victim(s)	Governor
Wayman King	Black	38	March 9, 1900	Escambia	Murder	Victoria Watkins, black (girlfriend)	William D. Bloxham
Frank Williams	Black		July 13, 1900	Franklin	Murder	Bryant Denham, black	William D. Bloxham
Will Wright	Black		August 10, 1900	Leon	Murder	John Smith, black	William D. Bloxham
William McIver	Black		August 17, 1900	Wakulla	Murder	Randolph Connors, black	William D. Bloxham
Pressley Callahan	Black		October 12, 1900	Citrus	Murder	William J. Everett, white	William D. Bloxham
Joseph Henderson	Black	17	March 29, 1901	Brevard	Murder	C. Burke, white	William Sherman Jennings
John Simmons	Black		July 5, 1901	Washington	Murder	Mr. Thomas, black	William Sherman Jennings
Belton Hamilton	Black		July 5, 1901	Washington	Murder	Jeff Davis, black	William Sherman Jennings
Jim Harrison	Black		July 5, 1901	Washington	Murder	Jeff Davis, black	William Sherman Jennings
William Williams	Black		July 5, 1901	Washington	Murder	Jeff Davis, black	William Sherman Jennings
James Faison	Black		July 5, 1901	Dade (Note: Crime committed at Stuart, now part of Martin County.)	Murder	John Saddlers, black	William Sherman Jennings
James Kirby	Black	30	August 2, 1901	St. Johns	Murder	Julius Eskew, white	William Sherman Jennings
Robert Lee	Black		August 2, 1901	St. Johns	Accessory to Murder	Julius Eskew, white	William Sherman Jennings
James M. Mercer	White	40	August 23, 1901	Hillsborough	Rape	Jessie Taylor, 9, white	William Sherman Jennings
Will Jones	Black		November 8, 1901	Madison	Murder	Three persons, one white and two black (Note: A black woman, a black man, and a white man named Anderson.)	William Sherman Jennings
Thomas J. Hampton	Black		December 6, 1901	Columbia	Murder	Sessom Calhoun and John Bell, white (Note: Serial killer, also confessed to the murder of a train conductor in South Carolina in 1887 and two other murders.)	William Sherman Jennings
Hampton Wynn	Black		January 24, 1902	Jackson	Murder-Robbery	Eugene Gaston, black	William Sherman Jennings
Henry Wilson	Black		April 4, 1902	Sumter	Murder	Lee Graham, 21, white	William Sherman Jennings
Moses Roberson	Black		April 4, 1902	Duval	Murder	Dennis Jenkins, black (deputy sheriff) (Note: Same crime as his brother Frank (see 1903).)	William Sherman Jennings
Frank Richardson	Black		July 18, 1902	Clay	Rape	Hester Lawrence, 11, black	William Sherman Jennings
Walter Lanier	Black		August 1, 1902	Gadsden	Murder	Lizzie Bell, black	William Sherman Jennings
Thomas Faircloth	White		September 30, 1902	Levy	Murder	Mr. and Mrs. L. B. Lewis, white	William Sherman Jennings
Theodore Smith	White		September 30, 1902	Levy	Murder	Mr. and Mrs. L. B. Lewis, white	William Sherman Jennings
Richard Dedwilly	Black		March 13, 1903	Dade	Rape	Sarah C. Gould, white	William Sherman Jennings
David Gamble	Black		April 3, 1903	Dade	Murder	David C. Burr, race unknown	William Sherman Jennings
John Bright	Black		April 10, 1903	Dade (Note: Kelly's crime was committed in present-day Palm Beach County.)	Murder	Lottie Hardeman, black	William Sherman Jennings
William Kelly	Black		April 10, 1903	Dade	Murder	Richard Hone, white	William Sherman Jennings
John Brown	Black		April 23, 1903	Nassau	Murder	Mr. and Mrs. Thomas Johnson, white	William Sherman Jennings
John Burns	Black		April 24, 1903	Suwannee	Murder	Alice Johnson, black (stepmother-in-law)	William Sherman Jennings
Frank Roberson	Black		August 7, 1903	Duval	Murder	Charles M. Sadler, white (deputy sheriff) (Note: Same crime as his brother Moses (see 1902).)	William Sherman Jennings
Robert Outley	?		September 4, 1903	Citrus	Murder	Barbery Outley, race unknown (wife)	William Sherman Jennings
Jim Polight	Black		September 11, 1903	Marion	Murder	D. J. Beasley, white	William Sherman Jennings
Charlie Miller	Black	28	March 4, 1904	Jefferson	Murder	Jerry Poppell, 28, white (constable)	William Sherman Jennings
Hampton Lee	Black		May 21, 1904	Columbia	Murder	Rosa Lee, black (wife)	William Sherman Jennings
Fred Ewert	White	22	December 2, 1904	Monroe	Murder-Robbery	Frank Whitaker, white	William Sherman Jennings
Fred Cook	Black		July 21, 1905	Marion	Murder	Isaiah Pitts, white	Napoleon B. Broward
Reuben Reed	Black		July 21, 1905	Clay	Murder	Ed George, black (Note: Confessed to also killing W. P. Davis (white), but was not tried for this.)	Napoleon B. Broward
Edward Lamb	White		October 27, 1905	Manatee	Murder	Christopher D. Kennedy, white	Napoleon B. Broward
Tom Spires	Black		October 27, 1905	Jackson	Rape	Florence Pope, white	Napoleon B. Broward
Isham Edwards	Black		November 3, 1905	Leon	Murder	N. W. Eppes, white (county superintendent of public instruction) (Note: Also murdered a woman, Anna Paine, during the same crime.)	Napoleon B. Broward
Andrew Jackson	Black		February 9, 1906	St. Johns	Murder	Alice Jackson, black (wife)	Napoleon B. Broward
Howard Sanford	White		February 9, 1906	Wakulla	Murder	Allen J. Geoghogan, white	Napoleon B. Broward
Edward Brown	Black		June 5, 1906	Dade	Murder	Dora Suggs, 29, white	Napoleon B. Broward
John Faison	?		June 5, 1906	Liberty	Murder	Herbert Johnson, race unknown	Napoleon B. Broward
Charles Walker	Black		June 5, 1906	Nassau	Murder	Alex Eubanks, black (Note: Also killed another man during the same incident.)	Napoleon B. Broward
Albert Simmons	Black	19	June 26, 1906	DeSoto	Murder	Three people, black (Note: His aunt Sally Simmons and her two sons, 4 and 2 years old respectively.)	Napoleon B. Broward
Tom Thomas	Black	35	February 19, 1907	Orange	Murder	Elijah Sargent, black	Napoleon B. Broward
Jasper Edwards	White	47	February 27, 1907	Lee	Murder	Robert Carson, 24, white	Napoleon B. Broward
Ed Suber	Black	28	June 14, 1907	Manatee	Murder	A. Corey, black (uncle)	Napoleon B. Broward
Nathan Woodall	Black	21	June 14, 1907	Santa Rosa	Murder	Walter Nowelling, white	Napoleon B. Broward
Alfred Sargent	Black		June 15, 1907	Duval	Murder-Robbery	John Skeels, elderly, white	Napoleon B. Broward
Walter Tyson	Black		August 30, 1907	Hernando	Murder	Robert Ellison, white	Napoleon B. Broward
George Mitchell	Black		August 30, 1907	Hernando	Murder	J. B. Garrison, white	Napoleon B. Broward
Ben Cooper	Black		August 30, 1907	Hernando	Murder	J. B. Garrison, white	Napoleon B. Broward
Will Collier	Black		August 30, 1907	Hernando	Murder	J. B. Garrison, white	Napoleon B. Broward
Kett Holt	Black		September 27, 1907	Santa Rosa	Murder	No information	Napoleon B. Broward
Dock Mack	Black		November 8, 1907	Duval	Rape	Female, white	Napoleon B. Broward
Joe Brown	Black		December 13, 1907	Nassau	Murder	Mr. and Mrs. Thomas Johnson, white	Napoleon B. Broward
Charles Powell	Black		February 28, 1908	St. Johns (Note: Crime committed at Bunnell, now part of Flagler County.)	Murder	John Rogers, black	Napoleon B. Broward
W. N. Smith	?		February 28, 1908	Clay	Murder	Julia Dunson, race unknown	Napoleon B. Broward
George Washington	Black	20	April 3, 1908	Hillsborough	Murder	Eugene Gurley, black	Napoleon B. Broward
Charley Robinson	?		July 31, 1908	Gadsden	Murder	Martha Robinson, race unknown	Napoleon B. Broward
Jesse Willis	Black		April 16, 1909	Orange	Murder	William H. Hammond, white	Albert W. Gilchrist
Mose Daniels	White		May 14, 1909	Walton	Murder	Jesse Jones, white	Albert W. Gilchrist
Will McFadden	Black		May 21, 1909	Brevard	Rape	Mrs. D. M. Walters, white	Albert W. Gilchrist
John Amonds	?		May 28, 1909	Citrus	Murder	Lilla Nattiel, race unknown	Albert W. Gilchrist
Walter Ledbetter	Black		June 4, 1909	Duval	Murder-Robbery	Eliza and Emily Norman, white	Albert W. Gilchrist
Otis Smith	White	32	June 11, 1909	Duval	Murder	Cora Bell Smith, 25, white (sister)	Albert W. Gilchrist
George Hawkins	Mixed (Note: Mulatto.)		July 2, 1909	St. Johns	Murder	Charles Joseph, Syrian	Albert W. Gilchrist
Aaron Williams	Black		July 9, 1909	St. Lucie	Murder	James Patterson, black	Albert W. Gilchrist
M. L. Thomas	?		July 31, 1909	Jefferson	Murder	Henry Hobbs, race unknown	Albert W. Gilchrist
Albert Smith	Black		August 10, 1909	Marion	Murder	Rev. Parson Draft, black	Albert W. Gilchrist

=== 1910s ===
Name	Race	Age	Date of execution	County	Crime	Victim(s)	Governor
Luke Thomas	Black		January 14, 1910	Nassau	Murder	Mack Austin, black	Albert W. Gilchrist
R. H. Owens	White		January 14, 1910	Alachua	Murder	R. L. Smith, white (Note: Confessed to the killing of a 17-year-old girl in Louisiana before execution but did not give any details.)	Albert W. Gilchrist
Roland Flowers	Black		March 4, 1910	Hillsborough	Rape	Jane Ellerbee, 50-60, white	Albert W. Gilchrist
Duke Thomas	Black		March 11, 1910	Jackson	Murder	C. W. Wilson, black (Note: Victim's identity possibly unconfirmed. Serial killer, also confessed to four other murders.)	Albert W. Gilchrist
Robert Dekle	Black		March 18, 1910	Polk	Murder	Archie Warren, black (Note: Also murdered a woman who was with Warren at the time.)	Albert W. Gilchrist
Irving Hanchett	White	14	May 6, 1910	Volusia	Murder	Cleavie Elizabeth Tedder, 15, white	Albert W. Gilchrist
George Fields	Black		June 25, 1910	Palm Beach	Murder	A. L. Savage, white	Albert W. Gilchrist
Edward Sims	Black		June 30, 1910	Polk	Murder	Martin S. Redd, 29, race unknown	Albert W. Gilchrist
Ernest Bryant	Black		July 1, 1910	Duval	Murder	Luke and Lula Foster, black	Albert W. Gilchrist
Brooks Foley	Black	36	July 29, 1910	Alachua	Rape	Mary Brown, black	Albert W. Gilchrist
Lawrence Dargan	Mixed (Note: Mulatto.)		August 19, 1910	Putnam	Murder	Mary Dargan, black (wife)	Albert W. Gilchrist
Derry Taft	Black	27	October 18, 1910	Hillsborough	Murder	Female, black (wife)	Albert W. Gilchrist
James Green	Black		January 27, 1911	Duval	Murder	Edward Scriven, black	Albert W. Gilchrist
Joe Curry	?		January 31, 1911	Jefferson	Murder	Jim Horton, race unknown	Albert W. Gilchrist
Letten Parker	Black		April 30, 1911	St. Johns	Murder	No information	Albert W. Gilchrist
William Walker	Black		July 14, 1911	Duval	Murder	Solomon Osterman, white	Albert W. Gilchrist
Edgar Youmans	Black		December 1, 1911	Putnam	Murder	Walter Polite and Arnita Faison, black	Albert W. Gilchrist
Will McCoy	Black		December 1, 1911	Putnam	Murder	Walter Polite and Arnita Faison, black	Albert W. Gilchrist
Ed Broome	Black		January 19, 1912	Osceola	Murder	Sam Boatwright, black	Albert W. Gilchrist
Dave Turner	Mixed (Note: Half Native and half black, reported to be a "Crotan".)	30	February 16, 1912	Marion	Murder	Alberta Nix, black (mistress)	Albert W. Gilchrist
Henry Richards	Black		February 16, 1912	Volusia	Murder	William P. Edwards, white (deputy sheriff)	Albert W. Gilchrist
James Knight	Black		February 16, 1912	Sumter	Murder	Willie Knight, black (wife)	Albert W. Gilchrist
Silas Burney	Black		April 26, 1912	Taylor	Murder	J. J. Rouse, white	Albert W. Gilchrist
Will Alexander	White	24	May 3, 1912	Duval	Murder	Jack Sumner, white	Albert W. Gilchrist
Henry Horee	White		May 10, 1912	Taylor	Murder	Sanky Cooper, white	Albert W. Gilchrist
Tom White	Black		May 31, 1912	St. Johns (Note: White and Baxter received a change of venue from Duval County. Johnson's crime was committed at Dinner Island, now part of Flagler County.)	Murder	Simon Silverstein, white (Note: Possible serial killers, both suspected of several other robberies and murders.)	Albert W. Gilchrist
Eugene Baxter	Black		May 31, 1912	St. Johns	Murder	Simon Silverstein, white	Albert W. Gilchrist
Steve Johnson	Black		May 31, 1912	St. Johns	Murder	George Williams, black	Albert W. Gilchrist
Abe Middleton	Black		June 7, 1912	Clay	Murder	Robert West, white	Albert W. Gilchrist
Obe Mathis	White		July 19, 1912	Jackson	Murder	Rufus T. Wester, white (relative)	Albert W. Gilchrist
George Watkins	Black		September 6, 1912	St. Lucie	Rape	No information	Albert W. Gilchrist
Fortune Perry	Black		September 27, 1912	Alachua	Murder	Charles Slaughter, white (Deputy sheriff) (Note: F. V. White also killed, but they do not appear to have been tried for this.)	Albert W. Gilchrist
Caine Perry	Black		September 27, 1912	Alachua	Murder	Charles Slaughter, white (Deputy sheriff)	Albert W. Gilchrist
Robert Anderson	Black	29	November 23, 1912	Hillsborough	Murder	Maria Rodriquez, white (Note: Serial killer, also killed Viola Danford (white) and Stephen Candoa (Spanish); shot at Alphonso Martinez (white, wounded), Ada Lewis (mulatto, wounded), and Susie Fox (black, missed); committed several arsons prior to shootings.)	Albert W. Gilchrist
Jim J. Johnson	Black		January 15, 1913	Marion	Rape	Lena Hewett, white	Park Trammell
Walter Kirby	Black		January 22, 1913	Polk	Rape	Llewella Ellen Tuner, white (Note: Also murdered a black woman on the night of November 29, 1912, the day before in Plant City, but was not tried for this.)	Park Trammell
Jake Williams	Black		April 4, 1913	Lake	Murder	C. C. Line, white	Park Trammell
George Whitehead	Black		April 18, 1913	Duval	Murder-Robbery	George M. Osborn, elderly, white	Park Trammell
Tom Bush	Black		May 21, 1913	Pasco	Murder	Hoyt Houston, black (Note: Also killed Houston's wife, Annie Johnson.)	Park Trammell
Tom Smith	Black	28	June 28, 1913	Alachua	Murder-Robbery	Dr. H. C. Spencer, white	Park Trammell
Hersey Mitchell	Black	26	July 23, 1913	Bradford	Murder	Arnold Brymer, black	Park Trammell
Sam Hurd	Black		January 30, 1914	Alachua	Murder	W. H. Mahaffey, elderly, black	Park Trammell
Tom Williams	Black		February 6, 1914	Putnam	Murder-Rape	Vallie Moore, 14, black (stepdaughter)	Park Trammell
Bennie Henson	White		March 13, 1914	Hillsborough	Murder	Ethel Henson, white (wife)	Park Trammell
Clarence Daly	White		April 10, 1914	Dade (Note: Crime committed in the Progresso area of Fort Lauderdale, now part of Broward County.)	Rape	Margaret Berry, 80, white	Park Trammell
Joseph Brown	Black		July 3, 1914	Dade	Murder	Charles Standford, black	Park Trammell
Will Moore	Black		November 27, 1914	Bradford	Murder	W. T. Andrews, white (deputy sheriff)	Park Trammell
Lonnie Rowland	Black	26	January 22, 1915	Duval	Murder	Napoleon Hagan, white (police officer)	Park Trammell
Wilson Reeves	Black		February 5, 1915	Brevard	Murder	Estella Lapine James, black (wife)	Park Trammell
Jesse Hill	Black		February 12, 1915	Brevard	Rape	Alice Naydo, 59, white	Park Trammell
Clyde Stover	Black		June 12, 1915	Putnam	Murder	Horace and Alonso Gardner, white	Park Trammell
Shelby Wise	Black		July 2, 1915	Palm Beach	Murder	Claude Brown, 26, white	Park Trammell
John Wade	Black		August 13, 1915	Hillsborough	Rape	Female, white	Park Trammell
Ed Maddox	Black		August 20, 1915	Escambia	Murder	Charles Crooks, white	Park Trammell
Emmett Thomas	Black	30+ (Note: Thomas (birth name Thompson) did not know his exact age, but knew he was older than 30.)	August 20, 1915	Escambia	Murder	Ruby Barnes, black (wife)	Park Trammell
Ebenezer Tobin	Black	44	October 22, 1915	Pinellas	Murder	Edward Sherman, 55, white	Park Trammell
Dock McDonald	Black		December 3, 1915	Gadsden	Murder	James B. Bush, white (deputy sheriff)	Park Trammell
Pearl White	Black		December 31, 1915	Bradford	Murder	Clara Simmons, black	Park Trammell
Zack Colson	Black		May 19, 1916	Taylor	Murder-Robbery	J. H. Sheppard, white	Park Trammell
Arthur Jones	Black		May 19, 1916	Taylor	Murder-Robbery	J. H. Sheppard, white	Park Trammell
Charles Haynes	Black	60	September 1, 1916	Hillsborough	Murder	Joseph Walker, white (Port Tampa police marshal)	Park Trammell
Walter Durham	Black		September 8, 1916	Hamilton	Murder	W. Raiford Royals, 42, white (deputy sheriff)	Park Trammell
Will Turner	Black		October 20, 1916	Alachua	Murder	C. F. Avery, elderly, white	Park Trammell
Boisey Long	Black	35	October 27, 1916	Alachua	Murder	Samuel George Wynne, 47, white (deputy sheriff)	Park Trammell
William Miles	Black		July 11, 1917	Manatee	Murder	Mrs. W. S. and Annie Edith Palmer, 6 months (Annie), white	Sidney Johnston Catts
Clarence McKinney	Black		December 7, 1917	Dade	Murder	Rev. James Bolton, 76, white	Sidney Johnston Catts
Edgar London	White		January 4, 1918	Pasco	Murder	Alberta London, white (wife)	Sidney Johnston Catts
Ed Mimbs	White		May 31, 1918	Polk	Murder-Robbery	Allen D. Bouie, white	Sidney Johnston Catts
George Barrington	Black		June 14, 1918	Gadsden	Murder	J. M. Freeman, white (deputy sheriff) (Note: Serial killer, denied murdering Freeman but confessed to five other murders shortly before his execution.)	Sidney Johnston Catts
Dave Miller	Black		August 16, 1918	DeSoto	Murder	Isam Smith, black (Note: Also killed deputy sheriff Henry Higgins (white) while fugitive after crime, but was only tried for Smith's murder.)	Sidney Johnston Catts
James Rice	Black	25	August 9, 1919	Marion	Murder	Joe Loy, Asian	Sidney Johnston Catts
Charlie Davis	Black		September 19, 1919	Gadsden	Murder	J. L. Forehand, white (sheriff)	Sidney Johnston Catts
Claude Howell	Black	39	October 17, 1919	Duval	Murder	Charles F. Turknetton, white (police officer)	Sidney Johnston Catts
Henry Bradley	Black		October 17, 1919	Duval	Murder	Charles P. Carroll, white	Sidney Johnston Catts
John Smallwood	Black		December 5, 1919	Gadsden	Murder	Bessie Smallwood, black (wife)	Sidney Johnston Catts

=== 1920s ===
Name	Race	Age	Date of execution	County	Crime	Victim(s)	Governor
John Cason	Black		January 2, 1920	Levy	Murder	Isabelle Cason, black (wife)	Sidney Johnston Catts
Robert Blackwell	White		July 23, 1920	Okaloosa	Murder-Robbery	Bud and Nancy Davis, white	Sidney Johnston Catts
Hosie Poole	Black		July 30, 1920	Escambia	Murder	Albert Poole, black (brother)	Sidney Johnston Catts
Tom Brown	Black		May 20, 1921	Hillsborough	Murder-Robbery	Albert Chambers, 28, white	Cary A. Hardee
John Wilson	White	52	June 17, 1921	Orange	Murder	Emma Dyal, white (sister-in-law)	Cary A. Hardee
Putnam Ponsell	White	30	September 23, 1921	Okaloosa	Murder-Robbery	John Tuggle, white	Cary A. Hardee
Jake Martin	White	35	September 23, 1921	Okaloosa	Murder-Robbery	John Tuggle, white	Cary A. Hardee
John Bowyer	Black	23	February 24, 1922	Alachua	Murder	Robert E. Arnow, white (deputy sheriff)	Cary A. Hardee
Eugene Payne	Black		January 12, 1923	Calhoun	Murder	Primus Blakely, black	Cary A. Hardee
Percy Bayliss	Black	24	March 30, 1923	Seminole	Murder	James Cleveland Jacobs, 28, white (deputy)	Cary A. Hardee
Nealey Augusta	Black		April 27, 1923	Volusia	Murder	Alberta Augusta, black (wife) (Note: Also killed wife's aunt, but was not executed for this.)	Cary A. Hardee
Arthur Johnson	Black		July 27, 1923	Alachua	Murder	H. C. Cross, white	Cary A. Hardee
Lawrence Revels	White		November 23, 1923	Lake	Murder	Charlotte I. and William Arthur Revels, white (wife and relative) (Note: Male relative variously identified as a half-brother, brother-in-law, or brother.)	Cary A. Hardee

== Electrocution ==
In 1923, the state legislature passed a new law, written by Fred H. Davis, changing the official execution method from local hangings to centralized electrocution at the state prison on January 1, 1924. Despite an early challenge to the new law in July 1929 by the circuit court of Union County over the prison superintendent being named a secondary executioner (as he was not elected or appointed), the electrocution law was held up by the state supreme court in November 1930. Sheriffs were still required to perform as primary executioners during this period until 1941, when a new law designated the state prison's first assistant engineer as the executioner. Two further hangings would also take place by exception, as noted below.

Executions by hanging

Name	Race	Age	Date of execution	County	Crime	Victim(s)	Governor
Frank Johnson	Black		October 7, 1924	Duval	Murder-Burglary	Atley Terrell, white	Cary A. Hardee
J. C. Coachman	Black		May 6, 1925	Manatee	Rape (Note: The victim was also murdered during the crime, but Coachman was only executed for rape.)	Irene Fostick, 7, black	John W. Martin
Will Champion	Black		January 28, 1926	Duval	Murder	Ethel Champion, black (wife)	John W. Martin
Roy Dunwood	Black		May 12, 1926	Duval	Murder-Robbery	William Meade, white	John W. Martin
John Simmons	Black		May 18, 1926	Duval	Rape	Annie Belle Cronkite, white	John W. Martin
Harry Scrimm	White	48	May 25, 1926	Dade	Rape	Harriett Melton, 3, white	John W. Martin
Phillip Taylor	Black		October 28, 1926	Dade	Murder	Mildred Taylor, black (wife)	John W. Martin
Willie Green	Black	20	November 23, 1926	Dade	Murder-Robbery	George Attam, Syrian (Note: Serial killers, two members of a three-man gang ("The Twentieth Street Killers") who committed four fatal robberies in November and December 1925. Their other three victims were Howard Hill (white), Vincente Nievla (Cuban), and Isaiah English (black). Williams had also previously murdered another black man, Lee Counts, in 1920.)	John W. Martin
Arthur Williams	Black	36	December 11, 1926	Dade	Murder-Robbery	George Attam, Syrian	John W. Martin
Lloyd Odell Salter	Black	28	March 1, 1927	Duval	Murder-Robbery	Altafar Rahman, Turkish	John W. Martin
Raymond Stone	Black	26	March 8, 1927	Duval	Murder-Robbery	Altafar Rahman, Turkish	John W. Martin
Rufus Chesser	White	20	March 23, 1927	Clay	Murder	Lawrence Dilaberry and Sally Boyles, white (brother-in-law and love interest)	John W. Martin
Earl London	Black		April 7, 1927	Polk	Murder	John Edward Harrelson, white (deputy sheriff)	John W. Martin
Charlie Browne	White		April 18, 1927	Volusia (Note: Hanged in DeLand under state jurisdiction. Browne had been convicted in 1922, and the state supreme court ruled he would be hanged after a plea was made over the change to electrocution.)	Murder	Howard D. Usher, white	John W. Martin
Fortune Ferguson	Black	22	April 27, 1927	Alachua	Rape	Louise Patterson, 8 or 9, white	John W. Martin
Benjamin F. Levins	White	38	November 22, 1927	Hillsborough	Murder	Merrell family, white (Note: Serial killer, also confessed to the murders of the Rowell family and their rooming tenant. Also suspected in the killing of his ex-wife Emma Hilliard, but does not appear to have been investigated for this.)	John W. Martin
Louis Thomas	White		November 29, 1927	Pinellas	Murder	Everett E. Blewfield, white (Tarpon Springs police officer)	John W. Martin
Thomas Costello	White	31	December 13, 1927	Hillsborough	Murder-Robbery	Antonio Regueria, 52, white	John W. Martin
William B. Henderson	White		December 21, 1927	Hillsborough	Murder-Robbery	Antonio Regueria, 52, white	John W. Martin
Robert C. Pittman	Black	26	June 13, 1928	Seminole	Murder	L. P. Hilton, white	John W. Martin
William Vaughn	Black		August 28, 1928	Duval	Murder	Bell Chapman, white	John W. Martin
Melvin Johnson	Black	26	September 4, 1928	Dade	Rape	Lillian Mickler, white	John W. Martin
Paul Crumpler	Black	29	September 18, 1928	Hillsborough	Rape	Female, white	John W. Martin
James Turner	Black	27	September 25, 1928	Calhoun	Murder	Kid Terrell, black	John W. Martin
George Davis	Black	25	October 9, 1928	Putnam	Murder-Robbery	Theo George, white	John W. Martin
Herbert Harvey	Black	21	October 23, 1928	Baker	Murder	Erasmus and Emma Reich, white	John W. Martin
Roosevelt Kirkland	Black		October 30, 1928	Baker	Murder	Erasmus and Emma Reich, white	John W. Martin
James Alderman	White	50	August 17, 1929	Broward (Federal) (Note: Hanged under the authoritity of the U.S. Coast Guard in a seaplane hangar in Fort Lauderdale. Only execution ever carried out by the U.S. Coast Guard.)	Murder	Sydney Sanderlin and Victor Lamby, white (Coast Guard officers) (Note: Also murdered Secret Service operative Robert Webster during the same incident.)	Doyle E. Carlton
Boss Funderburk	Black		March 19, 1930	Franklin	Murder	D. H. Scott, white (Apalachicola police officer)	Doyle E. Carlton
Clayton Bell	Black	26	January 27, 1931	Volusia	Murder	P. D. Edmunds, white	Doyle E. Carlton
T. Southworth	White	27	February 12, 1931	Palm Beach	Murder-Robbery	Horace Wells, white	Doyle E. Carlton
Nathan Burton	White	24	February 24, 1931	Alachua	Murder	Ellen Burton, 19, white (wife)	Doyle E. Carlton
Robert McQuagge	White	27	May 27, 1931	Jackson	Murder	Sennie Tayton, 45, white (mother-in-law)	Doyle E. Carlton
John Graham	Black		June 18, 1931	Marion	Rape	Rebecca Stokes, 14, white	Doyle E. Carlton
Henry Johnson	Black		June 24, 1931	Lake	Murder-Robbery	Anna Lawrence, white (Cassia postmaster)	Doyle E. Carlton
Jim Collins	Black		November 12, 1931	Dade	Rape-Robbery	Vida Tabler, white	Doyle E. Carlton
Lee Jacobs	Black	22	March 26, 1932	Marion	Rape	Belsar Jordan, 19, white	Doyle E. Carlton
Giuseppe Zangara	White	33	March 20, 1933	Dade	Murder	Anton Cermak, 59, white	David Sholtz
Elvin E. Jeffcoat	White	40	March 24, 1933	Pinellas	Murder	Fannie Jeffcoat, white (wife)	David Sholtz
Norman Heidt	White	26	July 10, 1933	Hillsborough	Murder-Robbery	Joe Johnson, white	David Sholtz
Louis Leavine	White	33	July 10, 1933	Hillsborough	Murder-Robbery	Joe Johnson, white	David Sholtz
Victor Palmer	White	26	July 10, 1933	Hillsborough	Murder-Robbery	Joe Johnson, white	David Sholtz
Walter Williams	Black	31	October 8, 1934	Dade	Rape	Laura Brawn, 54, white (Note: Serial rapist, also confessed to raping Ada Easterlin (60, white), a deaf-mute female (white), an 11-year-old girl (white), and an 8-year-old girl (white), attempted rape of a 15-year-old girl, and the attempted homicide of Frank Keeler.)	David Sholtz
Fred Anderson	Black	24	January 22, 1935	Duval	Murder-Robbery	Carl Schuman, 23, white	David Sholtz
Thomas Jefferson	Black	23	January 22, 1935	Duval	Murder-Robbery	Carl Schuman, 23, white	David Sholtz
George Robinson	Black	46	February 25, 1935	Seminole	Rape	Lillie Evans, black	David Sholtz
Herman Smith	White	36	April 5, 1935	Orange	Murder	Jeneral Casteel, 54, white (girlfriend's husband)	David Sholtz
Martin Jarvis	White	36	April 11, 1935	Sarasota	Murder	Bertie Clements and Lacy Dyal, white	David Sholtz
Monroe Hasty	Black	17	September 16, 1935	Volusia	Murder	Helena Loucakis, white	David Sholtz
Lonnie Green	Black	32	January 7, 1936	Bradford	Murder	Eveline Frazier, 8, black	David Sholtz
Ed Bradley	White	57	June 29, 1936	Santa Rosa	Murder-Robbery	Andrew Nall, white	David Sholtz
George Dixon	Black	27	August 24, 1936	Seminole	Murder-Robbery	Charlie Farmer, black	David Sholtz
Lee Clark	Black	30	October 19, 1936	Escambia	Murder	Female, black (wife)	David Sholtz
L. D. Padgett	White	28	October 19, 1936	Santa Rosa	Murder	Daisy Padgett, white (wife)	David Sholtz
James Milligan	White	24	October 19, 1936	Dade	Murder-Robbery	Frank Palmer, white	David Sholtz
Clarence D. Casey	White	23	October 19, 1936	Dade	Murder-Robbery	Frank Palmer, white	David Sholtz
Rufus Johnson	Black	20	October 26, 1936	Seminole	Murder	Sydney Lanier, black	David Sholtz
George W. Scroggins	Black	41	October 26, 1936	Dade	Murder	Male, black	David Sholtz
James W. Walker	Black	30	December 14, 1936	Pinellas	Murder-Robbery	Joseph Yasmin, Syrian	David Sholtz
Richard Williams	Black	32	December 14, 1936	Pinellas	Murder-Robbery	Joseph Yasmin, Syrian	David Sholtz
Willie Walker	Black	33	April 23, 1937	Nassau (Note: Change of venue from Duval County.)	Rape	Grace Hunt, 37, white	Fred P. Cone
Simee Lee Fields	Black	21	May 10, 1937	Hillsborough	Murder	Willie Mae Spann, black (common-law wife)	Fred P. Cone
Marcus C. Powell	White	50	July 12, 1937	Duval	Murder	Katharine Speer, white (wife) (Note: Serial killer; also killed Louise Speer, Katharine's mother, but was only indicted for this. Had previously been convicted of murdering George Fay in Alabama in 1908 and was acquitted of murdering William Cowles in 1931.)	Fred P. Cone
Walter Williams	Black	38	July 19, 1937	Duval	Murder-Robbery	Joe Johnson, black (Note: Williams confessed posthoumously through a written note to the murder of a Chinese person in Savannah, Georgia in 1921 but did not give any details.)	Fred P. Cone
Preston McDonald	Black	28	July 19, 1937	Duval	Murder-Robbery	Joe Johnson, black	Fred P. Cone
Robert Hinds	Black	17	July 23, 1937	Leon (Note: Change of venue from Franklin County.)	Rape	Female, white	Fred P. Cone
Orson Williams	Black	28	June 20, 1938	Hillsborough	Murder	LeRoy Horton, black	Fred P. Cone
Willie Randolph	Black	34	July 5, 1938	Duval	Murder-Robbery	James Riddle, 52, white	Fred P. Cone
Paul Bunge	White	53	February 2, 1939	Hillsborough	Murder	Three people, white (Note: His wife Marie (47) and their daughters Edith (9) and Nina (6).)	Fred P. Cone
Franklin Pierce McCall	White	21	February 24, 1939	Dade	Kidnapping (Note: Also murdered the victim.)	James Bailey Cash Jr., 5, white	Fred P. Cone
Johnny Smith	Black	30	May 12, 1939	Indian River	Murder-Robbery	Sam Jones, black	Fred P. Cone
Harvey McGraw	White	20	September 4, 1939	Santa Rosa	Murder-Robbery-Kidnap	Clifford Mann and Charles Wilkinson, white	Fred P. Cone
Clarence Parker	Black	29	June 5, 1940	Gilchrist	Murder	J. T. Owens, white	Fred P. Cone
Herbert Goddard	White	29	July 29, 1940	Palm Beach	Murder-Rape	Frances Dunn, 17, white	Fred P. Cone
Ivory Lee Williams	Black	19	November 11, 1940	Alachua	Murder-Rape	Georgia Hodge, 17, white	Fred P. Cone
Richard Smith	Black	48	April 15, 1941	Brevard	Murder	Willie Frazier, black	Spessard Holland
Frizell McLaren	Black	34	October 6, 1941	Dade	Murder	Homer C. Barton, 38, white (Coral Gables police sergeant)	Spessard Holland
Charles Henderson	Black	34	October 6, 1941	Orange	Murder-Robbery	W. Ray Smith, white	Spessard Holland
Wilburn R. Crews	White	37	October 6, 1941	Duval	Murder	Ollie Mae Crews, 26, white (wife)	Spessard Holland
Dan J. Ormond	White	51	October 6, 1941	Jackson	Murder	Henry Bradley, 60, white	Spessard Holland
Mack Ranson	Black	38	October 27, 1941	Duval	Murder	John Henry Ranson, 9, black (son) (Note: Also killed his daughter and sister-in-law, but was not tried for their murders.)	Spessard Holland
Paul Mardorff	White	50	October 27, 1941	Dade	Murder	Ethel Mardorff, white (wife)	Spessard Holland
Willie B. Clay	Black	19	December 29, 1941	Duval	Murder-Robbery	Mary Curtis, 59, white	Spessard Holland
Edward Powell	Black	18	December 29, 1941	Duval	Murder-Robbery	Mary Curtis, 59, white	Spessard Holland
Nathaniel Walker	Black	18	December 29, 1941	Duval	Murder-Robbery	Mary Curtis, 59, white	Spessard Holland
George Newsome	Black	29	March 2, 1942	Leon	Murder-Robbery	Marie Lummus, 41, white	Spessard Holland
Walter Roberson	Black	42	March 23, 1942	Dixie	Murder	Dorthea Roberson, black (wife)	Spessard Holland
Jicy Crawford	Black	28	March 23, 1942	Duval	Murder	Bronson Sweatt, 32, black	Spessard Holland
Angie Michael Ciangetti	White	50	March 23, 1942	Volusia	Murder	Anna Henson, white	Spessard Holland
Worth Roberson	White	27	March 23, 1942	Gilchrist	Murder-Robbery	Annice Jemima Roberts, 46, white	Spessard Holland
John A. Stanton	White	44	May 18, 1942	Dade	Murder-Robbery	Fred Knust, 64, white	Spessard Holland
James Baker	Black	32	June 15, 1942	Duval	Murder-Robbery	Mayme Surrency, white	Spessard Holland
Clyde Hysler	White	23	June 15, 1942	Duval	Murder-Robbery	Mayme Surrency, white	Spessard Holland
Byrdl Hudgins	White	23	July 20, 1942	Dade	Murder	L. P. Daniel, white (State Highway patrolman)	Spessard Holland
Willie M. Williams	Black	27	July 20, 1942	Taylor	Murder	Lonnie Fowler, white	Spessard Holland
Ernest James Robinson	Black	20	August 17, 1942	Duval	Murder-Robbery	Angus Wakefield, 58, white	Spessard Holland
Forrest Saylor	Black	35	January 18, 1943	Pinellas	Murder	Marie Saylor, black (wife)	Spessard Holland
Vincent J. Christy	White	38	March 1, 1943	Dade	Murder	Four people, white (Note: Irving Leopold (37), his wife Esther (32), Esther's son Stephen Singer (6), and Ralph Morin (19). The first three victims were killed in their home and Morin was killed on the same day in a separate carjacking.)	Spessard Holland
Cornelius E. Parker	Black	24	October 4, 1943	Hillsborough	Murder-Robbery	Vernon Long, white	Spessard Holland
James A. Young	Black	32	October 25, 1943	Hillsborough	Rape	Monica Fisher, white	Spessard Holland
Ruffie Lundon	Black	44	October 25, 1943	Alachua	Murder	James Robinson, black	Spessard Holland
George W. James	Black	54	October 29, 1943	Polk	Murder	Wilmon Green, black	Spessard Holland
Perry Acree	White	43	November 22, 1943	Levy	Murder-Robbery	K. D. Shores, white	Spessard Holland
Edgar Flowers	Black	21	June 26, 1944	Hillsborough	Rape	Catherine Oakes, white	Spessard Holland
Earl Thompson	White	33	August 19, 1944	Duval	Murder-Robbery	Joe Henry, 43, white (mother's fiancé)	Spessard Holland
Edward Thompson	White	25	August 19, 1944	Duval	Murder-Robbery	Joe Henry, 43, white (mother's fiancé)	Spessard Holland
James Davis	Black	16	October 9, 1944	Alachua (Note: Change of venue from Gadsden County.)	Rape	Kathleen Mawhinney, 22, white	Spessard Holland
Freddie Lee Lane	Black	18	October 9, 1944	Alachua	Rape	Kathleen Mawhinney, 22, white	Spessard Holland
James C. Williams	Black	25	October 9, 1944	Alachua	Rape	Kathleen Mawhinney, 22, white	Spessard Holland
Tom Mix	Black	37	December 28, 1944	Citrus	Murder	Marguerite Mix, black (wife)	Spessard Holland
Henry Sparks	Black	33	January 15, 1945	Palm Beach	Rape	Pauline Robinson, white	Millard Caldwell
Albert Green	Black	28	February 12, 1945	Lake	Murder	Jesse Beerbower, white (police officer)	Millard Caldwell
William H. Anderson	Black	23	July 25, 1945	Broward	Rape	Allmoin Snyder, white	Millard Caldwell
Pleas Dixon	Black	31	October 29, 1945	Holmes	Murder	Stevie Pennington, 51, white	Millard Caldwell
Ernest Warren	Black	29	October 29, 1945	Dade	Rape	Jean Lane, 16, white	Millard Caldwell
George L. Sullivan	White	37	January 14, 1946	Marion	Murder	Francis Newman, white	Millard Caldwell
Charlie Holloway	Black	30	January 14, 1946	Pinellas	Murder	Jennie Lee Holloway, black (wife)	Millard Caldwell
James Reed	Black	28	January 14, 1946	Dade	Rape	Marie B. Montell, white	Millard Caldwell
Eddie Lewis	Black	52	April 22, 1946	Brevard	Murder	Ed Roundtree, black (girlfriend's lover)	Millard Caldwell
Jacob Sugg Webb	Black	26	September 30, 1946	Broward	Rape	Alice Godridge, white	Millard Caldwell
Wilbur Paul Patterson	White	24	March 17, 1947	Volusia	Murder	Harry Raines, white (undercover officer)	Millard Caldwell
Lewis Green	Black	19	April 21, 1947	Dade	Rape	Myrna Whiten, 9, white	Millard Caldwell
Leroy Henderson	Black	36	June 16, 1947	Palm Beach	Murder	Fletcher Smith, black	Millard Caldwell
Tom Melton	Black	32	August 4, 1947	Duval	Rape	Mary Edith Miller, 16, white	Millard Caldwell
Joe Ferguson	Black	42	August 4, 1947	Broward	Rape	Eunice James, white	Millard Caldwell
James Andrew Maxwell	Black	31	August 4, 1947	Broward	Rape	Eunice James, white	Millard Caldwell
Reuben Harper	Black	30	January 5, 1948	Columbia	Rape	Mrs. Effie Grady, white	Millard Caldwell
Alexander H. Wiles	White	41	June 14, 1948	Duval	Murder	Ellis Van Dyal, white (Jacksonville police officer)	Millard Caldwell
Alonzo Washington Jr.	Black	25	August 23, 1948	Duval	Murder	Mrs. Fred W. Lewis, white	Millard Caldwell
Alphonso Edmond	Black	35	September 6, 1948	Dade	Rape	Sylvia Dean Woodall, <10, white	Millard Caldwell
Ernest Eugene Harper	Black	30	September 6, 1948	Polk	Murder	Thomas Smith, white	Millard Caldwell
David J. Watson	Black	23	September 15, 1948	N/A (Federal)	Murder	Benjamin Hobbs, 19, white	Millard Caldwell
Lonnie Lee Talley	Black	25	October 5, 1948	Duval	Rape	Sadie Loise Pipkin, white	Fuller Warren
Lacy Stewart	Black	19	October 25, 1948	St. Lucie	Murder-Robbery	Erich Spiller, 64, white	Fuller Warren
Felix Combs	Black	23	January 24, 1949	Pinellas	Rape-Robbery	Dolores Young and another woman, white	Fuller Warren
Aaron Quince	Black	22	February 7, 1949	Volusia	Murder-Rape	Lena Carter Sparkman, white	Fuller Warren
Arthur Edward Berry	White	23	April 4, 1949	Pasco	Murder-Rape	Willie Mae Benton, 14, white	Fuller Warren
Flem Griffis	White	30	August 8, 1949	Nassau	Murder	John Calvin Graham, white (ex-wife's brother) (Note: Also killed Samuel Null and Curtis Floyd Graham (John's brother), but was convicted of John's murder first.)	Fuller Warren
Henry V. Tillman	White	51	June 5, 1950	Duval	Murder	Frank Wood, white	Fuller Warren
George Wolfork Jr.	Black	28	January 8, 1951	Bradford	Murder-Robbery	Dave Silcox, white	Fuller Warren
L. D. Robinson	Black	46	January 8, 1951	Bradford	Murder-Robbery	Dave Silcox, white	Fuller Warren
Walter McDonald	Black	21	January 8, 1951	Bradford	Murder-Robbery	Dave Silcox, white	Fuller Warren
R. Charles Gifford	White	72	February 21, 1951	Pinellas	Murder	Charles Schuh, white (State house leader)	Fuller Warren
Jessie Hilton	Black	33	June 4, 1951	Volusia	Murder-Rape	Bertha Turner, white	Fuller Warren
John Washington Jr.	Black	25	June 4, 1951	Volusia	Murder-Robbery	William Bostic, 65, black	Fuller Warren
James Edward Felton	Black	25	August 6, 1951	Lake	Murder	Lee Cossett, black	Fuller Warren
Willie London	Black	42	August 6, 1951	Lake	Murder	Lee Cossett, black	Fuller Warren
Coy McCann	Black	48	April 7, 1952	Manatee	Murder	Katie Pompey, black (common-law wife)	Fuller Warren
Saul James	Black	28	April 21, 1952	Hillsborough	Rape	Edith D. Milliken, white	Fuller Warren
Merlin James Leiby	White	25	June 30, 1952	Collier	Murder-Robbery	Leonard Applebaum, 26, white	Fuller Warren
George W. Story	White	52	September 8, 1952	Duval	Murder	Thomas St. John, white (ex-wife's husband) (Note: Also killed his ex-wife Lucille, but was only tried for Thomas's murder.)	Fuller Warren
Jimmie Lee Brown	Black	30	July 6, 1953	Duval	Murder-Robbery	John Rogers, white	Daniel T. McCarty
Ed Brooks	Black	61	September 7, 1953	Franklin	Murder	J. M. Hicks, white	Daniel T. McCarty
Orion Nath Johnson	Black	19	September 28, 1954	Alachua	Murder	Edward Porter, white (Marion County sheriff)	Charley Eugene Johns
Tanner Brock	White	57	September 28, 1954	Columbia	Murder	Tommy Brock, 5, white (son)	Charley Eugene Johns
George Bailey	Black	36	October 4, 1954	Leon	Murder-Robbery	D. B. Pert, white	Charley Eugene Johns
James Henderson	Black	47	October 4, 1954	Leon	Murder-Robbery	D. B. Pert, white	Charley Eugene Johns
Avon Ellwood North	White	37	October 4, 1954	Polk	Murder	Betty Albritton, white	Charley Eugene Johns
Abraham Beard	Black	18	November 8, 1954	Leon	Rape	Mrs. John Kelly, 52, white	Charley Eugene Johns
Leroy Williams	Black	37	November 8, 1954	Palm Beach	Murder	Charles Summerlin, white	Charley Eugene Johns
John H. McVeigh	White	34	April 18, 1955	Duval	Murder	Robert Quincy Tucker, 27, white (Jacksonville traffic officer)	LeRoy Collins
Louis Gillard	Black	54	August 29, 1955	Hillsborough	Murder	Turney McCromley, black	LeRoy Collins
Chester F. Dyer	White	20	October 31, 1955	Sarasota	Murder-Robbery	R. H. Jones, 68, white	LeRoy Collins
Samuel J. Hornbeck	White	38	December 12, 1955	Duval	Murder	Thomas Robinson, white (Jacksonville police officer)	LeRoy Collins
Herman Barwicks	Black	28	February 20, 1956	Polk	Murder	Beatrice McNeal, black (common-law wife)	LeRoy Collins
Percy Armbrister	Black	25	February 20, 1956	Dade	Murder	Edward Fritz Jr., 23, white (Miami police officer)	LeRoy Collins
George Anderson	Black	32	February 20, 1956	Dade	Murder	Edward Fritz Jr., 23, white (Miami police officer)	LeRoy Collins
Charlie Copeland Jr.	Black	24	April 28, 1956	Duval	Rape	Sharon Janet McLain, 13, white	LeRoy Collins
Edgar J. LaVoie	White	55	August 20, 1956	Putnam	Murder	Sandra Brennan, 14, white (step-daughter) (Note: Also killed his ex-wife Marjorie, 45, but was not tried for her murder. Sandra was later found to have been pregnant when murdered.)	LeRoy Collins
Moses Lee Dunmore	Black	21	October 1, 1956	Alachua	Rape	Clara Sauls, white	LeRoy Collins
Robert Lee Colson	Black	25	October 1, 1956	Alachua	Rape	Clara Sauls, white	LeRoy Collins
Joseph L. Ezzell	White	42	January 21, 1957	Duval	Murder-Robbery	Margaret Baynard, white	LeRoy Collins
William O. Raulerson	White	49	July 15, 1957	Columbia	Murder	John O'Neal, white	LeRoy Collins
Roosevelt Rhone	Black	33	September 30, 1957	Marion	Murder	Starreatha Rhone, 20, black (wife)	LeRoy Collins
Bozzie Nelson	Black	45	May 26, 1958	Palm Beach	Murder	Sara Campbell, black	LeRoy Collins
George L. Everett	White	23	June 13, 1958	Bay	Murder-Rape	Lou Ellen Jones, 21, white	LeRoy Collins
Harry Frank Long	White	35	September 29, 1958	Duval	Murder-Robbery	Thomas Coleman Sr., white	LeRoy Collins
Willie Horne	Black	25	January 12, 1959	Duval	Rape	Marie Marvin Sharpe, 48, white	LeRoy Collins
Jimmie Lee Thomas	Black	35	January 19, 1959	Duval	Rape	Leona Lassiter, 36, white	LeRoy Collins
Dallas E. Withers	White	38	February 2, 1959	Bay	Murder (Note: Both victims sexually abused before being murdered.)	David and Douglas Wilson, 7 and 4, both white (Note: Serial rapist, confessed to "molesting children for years" without being caught.)	LeRoy Collins
Frank Peterson	Black	33	June 1, 1959	Holmes	Murder-Rape	Carnley family, white (Note: Ira Gene Carnley, his wife (21), and their daughter Earnestine (2). Ira and Earnestine were murdered, and then Mrs. Carnley was raped.)	LeRoy Collins
John Frazier	Black	44	June 1, 1959	Union	Murder-Rape	Lacie Pearman, black (cousin)	LeRoy Collins
Harley A. Conner	White	59	June 1, 1959	Gilchrist	Murder	Frank Read, white (sheriff)	LeRoy Collins
E. C. Daniels	Black	49	August 28, 1959	Columbia	Murder	Clara Mae Ward, black (girlfriend)	LeRoy Collins
Sam Wiley Odom	Black	20	August 28, 1959	Lake	Rape	Kate Coker, 63, white	LeRoy Collins
Willie George City	Black	22	November 13, 1959	Pinellas	Rape	Myrtle Furst, white (Note: Serial rapist, confessed to raping three white women and three black women and to attempting to rape a seventh woman.)	LeRoy Collins
John Edward Paul	Black	24	November 13, 1959	Pinellas	Rape	Gladys Cothreel, 47, white	LeRoy Collins
Ralph Williams	Black	26	February 1, 1960	Pinellas	Rape-Kidnap	Patricia Morrison, 17, white	LeRoy Collins
James E. Brooks	Black	29	June 20, 1960	Palm Beach	Murder-Robbery	Helen Baier, white	LeRoy Collins
Robert Wesley Davis	White	26	August 7, 1961 (Note: Last executions at the present-day Union Correctional Institution.)	Leon	Rape	Female, 11, white	C. Farris Bryant
Norman D. Mackiewicz	White	32	August 7, 1961	Dade	Murder	Robert Staab, white (Bal Harbour police lieutenant)	C. Farris Bryant
Johnnie Hill	Black	28	May 12, 1962 (Note: First executions at the current Florida State Prison.)	Escambia	Murder	John Brightwell, white	C. Farris Bryant
Robert Lee Jefferson	Black	22	May 12, 1962	Bay	Murder-Robbery	Lawrence Digsby, 31, white	C. Farris Bryant
Samuel Johnson	Black	42	September 6, 1962	Putnam	Murder	Glenn Faulk, white (Palatka police officer)	C. Farris Bryant
Joe Smith	White	21	September 24, 1962	Union	Murder	Duke Olsen, 22, white (cellmate) (Note: Murdered at the old Florida State Prison while serving time for a narcotics charge. Smith and Leach were serving time for theft and breaking & entering respectively.)	C. Farris Bryant
William E. Leach	White	22	September 24, 1962	Union	Murder	Duke Olsen, 22, white (cellmate)	C. Farris Bryant
Charles H. Lee	White	35	July 18, 1963	Levy	Murder	Leroy Collins and Louvada Lee, 57 and 22, white (father-in-law and wife)	C. Farris Bryant
Emmett C. Blake	White	32	May 12, 1964	Bay	Murder-Robbery	John Beverly, white (Note: Also charged with second-degree murder for the murder of John T. Holt during the same crime.)	C. Farris Bryant
Sie Dawson	Black	49	May 12, 1964	Gadsden	Murder	Roger Glenn Clayton, 2, white (Note: Also confessed to murdering Roger's mother, 36-year-old Maggie Mae Clayton, but was not tried on this charge.)	C. Farris Bryant

== See also ==
- Capital punishment in Florida
- Crime in Florida
