= Emmett Blake =

American murderer

- Born: August 8, 1931; Birmingham, Alabama
- Died: May 18, 1964 (aged 32); Florida State Prison, Bradford County, Florida
- Cause of death: Execution by electrocution
- Occupations: Carpenter; Welder
- Criminal charges: First-degree murder Second-degree murder
- Criminal penalty: Death
- Criminal status: Executed

Emmett Clark Blake (August 8, 1931 – May 18, 1964) was an American man convicted of the murder of grocer John Beverly during a 1962 robbery in Bay County, Florida. Blake was sentenced to death and chose to not appeal his sentence, becoming a volunteer and asking to be executed. Blake, alongside Sie Dawson, was one of the last individuals executed by the state of Florida before the Furman v. Georgia ruling of 1972.

== Background ==
Emmett Clark Blake was born in Birmingham, Alabama to Carrie E. Blake and her husband. His father died prior to 1950. He had a brother, Dalton Blake. Blake was a veteran of the Air Force with a wife and child, and worked as a welder on a oil rig owned by a Texas-based company.

== Crime ==
On June 21, 1962, Emmett Blake and an accomplice, James Teal, robbed the grocery store owned by John Beverly at Brannonville in Bay County, Florida, five miles north of Panama City. Blake had gone on a drinking spree after a disagreement with his mother, where he met Teal, and the two decided to rob a store. Both Beverly and a customer, retired Air Force sergeant John T. Holt, were shot during the crime; a woman who parked outside of the store as Blake was leaving convinced him not to shoot her, and she noted the license plate number of his car. Holt died at the scene and Beverly died en route to a nearby hospital. Roadblocks were set up in the area looking for the suspects' vehicle, "a late model blue car with Alabama plates."

== Trial and execution ==
Emmett Blake was convicted of the first-degree murder of John Beverly and sentenced to death. Blake was also charged with second-degree murder for the murder of John T. Holt but never brought to trial on this charge. James Teal was convicted of second-degree murder for his role in the crime and sentenced to life imprisonment.

On September 27, 1963, the Florida Supreme Court upheld Blake's conviction and death sentence. In March 1964, his brother Dalton Blake made an appeal for commutation to life imprisonment on behalf of Emmett, however Emmett did not cooperate with Dalton, who had become "a pretty good-sized politician (in Alabama) at the time." Blake personally wrote to Florida's then-governor, C. Farris Bryant, asking that his sentence be carried out. He saw "his pending execution as a way of forcing society to take his life after several attempts to do so himself failed." On March 11, 1964, the State Pardon Board denied Dalton's plea and once again confirmed Emmett's death sentence. Death row guard Sgt. J. C. Fletcher recounted that Blake told him that "he wanted to go, because he figured he'd do it again, and he felt it was just like a business, and he'd went bankrupt."

Emmett Blake was executed by electrocution at the Florida State Prison on May 12, 1964. As he was being strapped into the electric chair, he told the room "Well, I'm not mad at anybody. I hope none of you are mad with me." The electric current was activated at 8:41 AM and he was pronounced dead at 8:49 AM by prison physician Dr. J. D. Simpson.

== Aftermath ==
Emmett Clark Blake and Sie Dawson became the last two individuals to be executed by the state of Florida before the Furman v. Georgia decision of 1972, in which the Supreme Court declared capital punishment unconstitutional under the cruel and unusual punishment clause of the eighth amendment. As a result, discussion surrounding their respective cases regained attention in 1976 and 1977 after the Gregg v. Georgia ruling overturned Furman and restored capital punishment. Many publications compared Blake's acceptance and refusal to appeal his death sentence in comparison to Dawson, who actively appealed his. In July 1976, the Lakeland Ledger compared Blake's attitude to the writing of Franz Kafka: "It was Kafka, if we recall correctly, who wrote of a polished killer who nevertheless was professionally noble in facing the consequences. He accepted punishment by his own cold standards. We suspect Emmett Blake was a lot like that."

== See also ==
- List of people executed in Florida (pre-1972)
- List of people executed in the United States in 1964
