= Key West race riot =

Failed lynching and race riot in 1897

The Key West race riot occurred in 1897, after a 19-year-old black man was accused of raping a white woman in the city. While there were attempts to lynch Sylvanus Johnson, the alleged perpetrator, an all-black group defended him at his jail. They shot and killed a white man in the process, fomenting a race riot. Johnson was executed after a 21-minute deliberation by an all-white jury. He admitted his guilt at his trial and confessed a second time at his execution.

== Background ==
Key West, Florida, had been established for about a year when Sylvanus Johnson, a 19-year-old black man, was accused of raping Maggie Atwell, a white woman. He had allegedly attacked her while she and two of her friends were collecting flowers in June 1897. He was jailed after Atwell identified him as her rapist. The night of the accusation, a mob of some 25 to 30 men tried to storm the jail and lynch Johnson. They failed, as the jail keeper did not turn him over. The jail keeper and his associates had drawn their guns on the white mob who attempted to access Johnson.

C.B. Pendleton, the owner and editor of two newspapers in the city and a Knights of Labor leader, urged a lynching at the court hearing for Johnson: He had asked whether there were enough white men to lynch him. This was a public call, and the Miami Metropolis said it was intended to warn black residents of the city of a lynching. The Miami Metropolis also said it allowed them time to organize and prevent it; had Pendleton not said anything, they argued, he could have met no resistance. After Pendleton's outburst, a black resident called to lynch Pendleton, and a group swarmed the editor. He drew his guns and fled in a carriage. Soon, another group of black residents of the town surrounded the jail, promised to shoot any white person who tried to take Johnson, and threatened to burn down Key West. They shot and killed James William Gardner, a 40-year-old white man, and badly beat several others that night.

== Riot ==
The sheriff thereafter formed a mob of some 40 people, and asked the governor to root out the black group. The governor, William D. Bloxham, in turn asked for assistance from president William McKinley and his secretary of war. (Note: Bloxham was Democratic proponent of "states' rights", and he asked a Republican president for help in the incident.) With his group formed, the sheriff had prevented much disturbance throughout the town. This may have been in part caused by him shooting and injuring a black man in front of a black mob. Ultimately, there was no revenge by the white residents of the town against the black residents.

== Aftermath ==
Newspapers around the United States blamed the violence on Johnson, although the Afro-American Sentinel from Omaha, Nebraska, praised the black community's vigorous defense of him.

An all-white jury was empaneled for Johnson's trial. After all three women identified Johnson, who admitted his guilt, the jury found him guilty after 21 minutes of deliberation. He was sentenced to death and executed by hanging on 21 September 1897 as a crowd of as many as 5,000 people watched. Johnson admitted his guilt again at his execution.

== See also ==
- Capital punishment in Florida
- List of people executed in Florida (pre-1972)

== Notes and references ==
=== Bibliography ===
- Barnes, Deborah H. (December 2016). ""... the furrow of his brow": The cultural logic of black lynch mobs". Journal of African American Studies. 20 (3–4): 272–293. doi:10.1007/s12111-016-9331-7. S2CID 152008356.
- Fleischmann, Thomas F. (1992). "Black Miamians in the Miami Metropolis" (PDF). Tequesta: The Journal of the Historical Association of Southern Florida. LII: 21–38. Archived from the original (PDF) on 18 October 2021.
- Ortiz, Paul (2005). Emancipation betrayed: The hidden history of black organizing and white violence in Florida from Reconstruction to the bloody election of 1920. Berkeley: University of California Press. ISBN 9780520250031.
- Sloan, David (30 July 2020). "The Key West race war of 1897". Keys Weekly.
- Williams, Kidada E. (2012). They left great marks on me: African American testimonies of racial violence from emancipation to World War I. New York: New York University Press. ISBN 9780814795354.
