= 1926–27 Tampa murders =

Series of related homicides in Tampa, Florida

- Date: April 28, 1926 – May 27, 1927
- Location: Tampa, Florida, U.S.
- Type: Multiple homicides
- Deaths: 10
- Convicted: Benjamin Levins
- Verdict: Execution by electrocution
- Convictions: Benjamin Levins: Homicide (5)

From April 1926 to May 1927, 10 persons were murdered in Tampa, Florida. Benjamin Franklin Levins, a 38-year-old Florida native, was convicted and executed for five of the murders, although all of the murders were believed by investigators to have been connected.

== Murders ==
=== Emma Hilliard ===
On April 28, 1926, Tampa police were dispatched by the precinct to 508 Nebraska Avenue, where it was reported that newspaper vendor Charles "Blind Charlie" Manuel was slashing a woman's throat. On arrival, the body of Emma Hilliard was discovered, decapitated, with a drunk Manuel holding a jack knife. Despite her having been married, Manuel claimed Hilliard was his girlfriend. Hilliard is reported to have had "no shortage of men in her past", including an ex-husband named Benjamin Levins. Manuel was immediately arrested. In July, Manuel pleaded guilty, despite not having any recollection of the crime; he claimed this was due to his having been drunk, and believed that witnesses who saw him attack Hilliard were telling the truth.

=== Rowell household ===
On June 28, 1926, three members of the Rowell family and their tenant, mechanic Charles Alexander, were found hacked to death with an axe in their home at 116 South Nebraska Avenue. A neighboring housewife who sensed something was wrong due to a lack of visible activity by the family found the bodies. Rumors began to spread shortly after the killings that Bee Rowell, the 45-year-old Rowell family patriarch, had told people around Tampa that Manuel was innocent of killing Hilliard and that he knew who the real killer was. Investigators questioned multiple suspects, but no charges were filed. This led investigators to review the Hilliard case, and they discovered the witnesses who identified Manuel as the attacker were not credible, but evidence to clear him of suspicion in the case was elusive.

=== Merrell household ===
On May 27, 1927, five members of the Merrell family, including five-week-old baby Lester Merrell, were found killed in their home on the corner of 1st Avenue and 31st Street. The bodies were found by 15-year-old Kenneth Merrell, who had come home from a night out with friends in St. Petersburg. His brother Hugh, 8, was in the house unharmed; another of Kenneth's brothers, three-year-old Buddy Merrell, had been killed in the same room as Hugh, but Hugh had fallen under his bed and was not seen by the killer. As investigators searched the house, the murder weapon was found in the front bedroom: an unusual hammer, identified as a railroad spike driver, led to suspicion the perpetrator was a railroad worker.

At 4:30 that morning, a woman driving through the neighborhood saw a man walk along the street and stop in front of the Merrell home. Investigators suspected this man was the killer, but he actually turned out to be a workman looking for the residence of a friend who was going to drive him to work; he found the friend's house shortly after stopping in front of the Merrell's.

The next day, two men asked a local fortune teller, Mrs. Lizzell Banta, if "they were going to get into trouble about this Merrell mess"; she initially thought they were just giving her ridiculous questions, something she regularly experienced, but she called police after becoming suspicious of them.

== Benjamin Levins ==
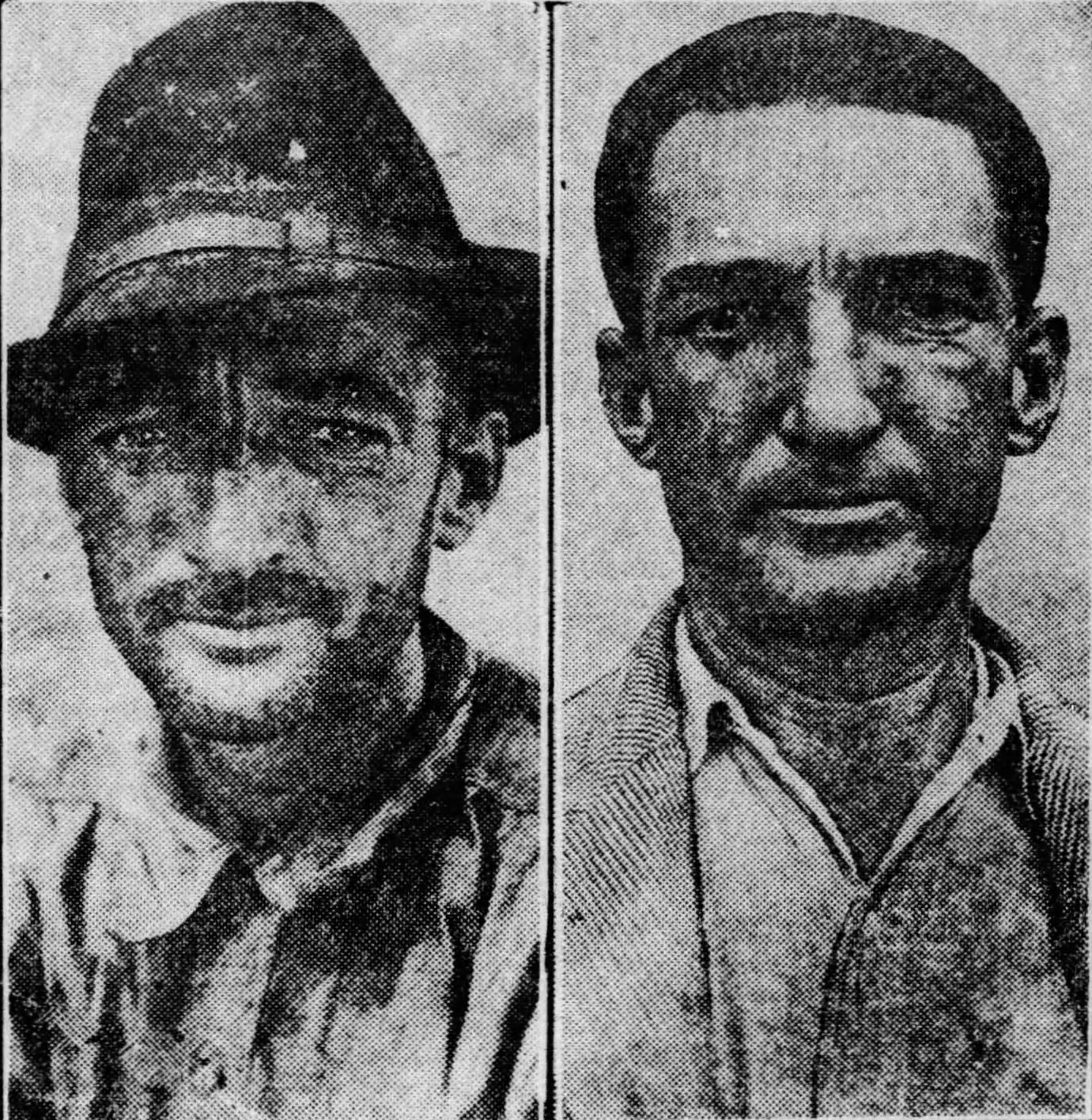
Side-by-side photos of Benjamin Levins, one during his arrest in May 1927 (L) and one the day his trial began in July 1927 (R)

=== Arrest ===
The afternoon of the day after the Merrill murders, Lieutenant D. Z. Meeks of the Tampa Police reported a discovery he had made in a lumber yard half a mile from the Merrill residence. In between the stacks of lumber, a newspaper detailing the Merrill family murders was laid out on the ground with bread loaf scraps and a few hand-rolled cigarette butts; it appeared that someone had been sleeping at the site. Nearby, three broken matches were found; broken matches had also been found at the Merrell home. Meeks and his officers set up in the lumber yard, and caught the man sleeping there shortly after midnight and arrested him.

The prisoner gave his name as B. F. Levins, age 38; fisherman, laborer, and itinerant worker; born in a small settlement called Bullfrog on the edge of the Everglades; and had lived in Tampa for five or six years. While in custody, he broke a match like the others, and investigators matched his boot print to one found at the Merrill home. He acknowledged having been at the Merrill home that night, but he claimed he was not the killer. Levins said the killer was a man named Leonard Thompson; Thompson was a friend of Levins'.

Levins said that he and Thompson had been drinking together when Thompson said, "Merrell done me a dirty trick and I'm going to get him tonight" [sic]. They walked up the railroad tracks to the Merrell home, and Levins laid in the grass while Thompson entered the house. After hearing some noises in the house, Levins lit a match by the back door and saw the bodies. He left immediately, with Thompson taking him to Mrs. Banta's tent the next day.

=== Leonard Thompson ===
Leonard Thompson was arrested from his boarding house at the corner of 7th Avenue and 31st Street. He agreed he had been drinking with Levins, but said he went back to the boarding house and was in bed by 9:30 pm. He claimed to have had no knowledge of the Merrell murders prior to visiting Mrs. Banta, which he claimed was Levins' idea.

It was discovered that the Merrell home was formerly occupied by the Ryles family. Two months prior, when the Ryles family still lived in the residence, an intruder broke in only to be frightened away, dropping a railroad maul. Mr. Ryles had previously given police information on the Rowell murders, and despite the information proving worthless, he felt his family was in danger, and they moved to the countryside. The Merrell family had only lived six weeks in the home. Police theorized that Levins had been the intruder and, upon returning to the home, killed the wrong family.

After viewing the bodies of the Merrell family three times at a morgue, Levins confessed to the crime, confirming he had indeed mistaken the Merrell family for the Ryles family. He said he realized his mistake when reading the newspaper the next day.

=== Public reaction and failed lynching ===
As news of Levins' confessions leaked to the public, angry crowds came to the county jail demanding to see the prisoner. Sheriff Hiers called in state troops, and the 116th Field Artillery of the Florida National Guard, led by Colonel S. L. Lowry, surrounded the jail with machine guns and sandbags. Further enraged, the mob (well over 1,500 people) rushed the jail on May 29, 1927, forcing the troops to open fire, shooting and injuring 12 people. When they tried to rush the jail again two hours later, the troops mowed them down with machine guns. Overall, four people were killed and 33 were wounded, four of them seriously. One of those shot, S.J. Ellis, later died from their injuries. Twenty men were arrested on charges of inciting to riot, affray, unlawful assembly, and shooting into a public building. In November 1927, seven men pleaded guilty to engaging in unlawful assembly and were each fined $100. The judge offered to have them serve 90 days in jail instead, but they agreed to pay the fine. The charges against six others were dismissed.

Levins was taken to an Orlando jail three days later, and he confessed to the Rowell murders there, saying he had gotten into a fight with their tenant over a girl, and then killed the family so they could not identify him.

=== Trial ===
Levins' trial was held in Orlando over July 1927. In court, his defense stated that the police had repeatedly threatened him, claiming that police told him to confess to the Merrell murders while in Orlando or he would be returned to Tampa. Levins then admitted to killing Herman Merrell, although he claimed he killed Merrell in self-defense after Merrell had caught him breaking into the house. However, Levins said he had left the house afterwards, insisting the other victims had been killed by Thompson after he left. He was convicted of the murders of the Merrell family, and Thompson was acquitted 3 weeks later in a separate trial. Levins was sentenced to death.

=== Execution ===
Levins was executed in the Florida state electric chair at the State Prison in Raiford on November 22, 1927, at 1:45 pm. The day prior, Levins attempted to obtain a stay of execution, but Judge Robles, despite having been ill at home, made it known over the telephone this would not occur. That same night, Levins protested his innocence, but he expressed confidence he would "make it all right up there". The witnesses for the execution included two Tampa ministers (a Baptist and a Presbyterian), the chief county traffic officer, a bailiff of criminal court, the county jailer, the deputy sheriff, and a Tampa Tribune reporter. Governor John W. Martin gave Levins a three-hour reprieve. Levins reportedly spent his last hours in prayer and continued insistence he was innocent, but he made no formal final statement prior to his execution. His body, unclaimed, was buried in the prison cemetery.

== Aftermath ==
Charles Manuel, who pleaded guilty to manslaughter, was released from prison on November 15, 1930.

== List of deaths ==
=== Murder victims ===
- Emma Hilliard
- Rowell family
  - Caroline Rowell, 94
  - Bee Dee Rowell, 45, grocery clerk
  - Eva Rowell, 16
  - Charles Alexander, 40, mechanic (no relation; rooming tenant)
- Merrell family
  - Herman "Looney" Merrell, carpenter
  - Nettie Merrell, drink stand operator
  - Ralph Merrell, 11
  - Mildred Merrell, 5
  - Buddy Merrell, 3
  - Lester Merrell, 5 weeks

=== Riot deaths ===
- Hal Pifer, 33, bus driver, Ocala
- Hugh Edward McRae, Ontario, Canada
- Earl McGill of the Sinclair Oil Corporation
- W. E. Browning, 43
- S.J. Ellis

=== Execution ===
- Benjamin Levins, 38

== See also ==
- Capital punishment in Florida
- List of people executed in Florida (pre-1972)
- List of serial killers in the United States
