= Piggen, Virginia =

Unincorporated community in Virginia, United States

Coordinates: 37°35′41″N 75°43′14″W

Piggen is an unincorporated community in Accomack County, Virginia, United States.
