= List of last executions in the United States by crime =

This is a list of the last executions in the United States for the crimes stated.

== List of last persons to be executed for a crime other than murder ==
Crime	Convict	Race	Age	Date	Location	Method	Other notes
Robbery	James Cobern	White	38	September 4, 1964	Alabama (state)	Electrocution	Cobern also murdered and sexually mutilated his victim. He was charged with murder, rape, and robbery, but the murder and rape charges never went to trial. Other sources call him James Coburn. Herbert Bradley was executed in Texas on May 16, 1962 for a robbery in which the victim was left permanently crippled from the waist down after being shot six times and beaten with a hammer, but did not die.
Rape	Ronald Wolfe	White	33	May 8, 1964	Missouri (state)	Gas chamber	Wolfe's victim was an 8-year-old girl. At the time of his arrest, he was also wanted for raping another 8-year-old girl in New York.
Assault	Rudolph Wright	Black	31	January 11, 1962	California (state)	Gas chamber	Wright's victim died. He received a life sentence for first degree murder and a mandatory death sentence for assault with a deadly weapon by an inmate serving a life sentence. Robert Harmon was executed in California for assault by a life convict on August 9, 1960 in a case where the victim did not die. Harmon wrote to the governor and warned that he would continue to assault or kill fellow inmates unless he was executed.
Kidnapping	Billy Monk	White	26	November 21, 1960	California (state)	Gas chamber	Monk raped and stabbed his victim. While Victor Feguer is listed in ESPY as being executed for kidnapping, he also murdered his victim.
Burglary	Ross McAfee	Black	39	November 22, 1957	North Carolina (state)	Gas chamber	McAfee was convicted of burglary in conjunction with the attempted rape of a 17-year-old girl whom he also attempted to murder. He also admitted to the murder of an elderly woman in Georgia in 1956. In the Epsy files, the last execution recorded for burglary as housebreaking is of Frank Bass, electrocuted in Alabama on August 8, 1941. He beat up Virginia Canterbury during the burglary.
Espionage	Ethel and Julius Rosenberg	White	35 (Julius) and 37 (Ethel)	June 19, 1953	New York (federal)	Electrocution	The Rosenbergs rejected numerous chances to cooperate in exchange for clemency prior to their executions.
Desertion	Eddie Slovik	White	24	January 31, 1945	Sainte-Marie-aux-Mines, France (military)	Firing squad	Slovik was the first person to be executed for desertion since the American Civil War. Clarence D. Gibson was executed on September 18, 1945, for premeditated murder and desertion.
Sabotage	Herbert Hans Haupt, Heinrich Heinck, Edward Kerling, Hermann Neubauer, Richard Quirin, and Werner Thiel	White	22 (Haupt), 35 (Heinck and Thiel), 33 (Kerling), 32 (Neubauer), and 34 (Quirin)	August 8, 1942	Washington, D.C. (federal)	Electrocution	Executed for their roles in Operation Pastorius
Attempted murder	Tommie Howard	Black	38	January 15, 1937	Louisiana (state)	Hanging	Howard shot a man in the head with a shotgun during a robbery. The man suffered permanent injuries and died from them 9 months after Howard's execution. Howard had previously served 10 years of a life sentence for murder. Paul Pringle was executed in Louisiana in 1882 for the attempted murder of a man, who did not later die from his injuries, during a robbery.
Train robbery	Black Jack Ketchum	White	37	April 26, 1901	New Mexico Territory (federal)	Hanging	Ketchum also was wanted for murder. Statutes under which he was convicted was later found unconstitutional.
Arson	George Hughes, George Smith, and Asbury Hughes	White	21 (George Hughes), 30 (George Smith) and 22 (Asbury Hughes)	August 1, 1884	Alabama (state)	Hanging	George Smith was linked to two murders in other states.
Mutiny	David Craig, Joseph Green, Thomas Plowder, James Allen, Howard Thomas, and Nathaniel Joseph	Black	21 (Craig), 44 (Plowder), 23 (Allen), 19 (Thomas), and 20 (Joseph)	December 1, 1865	Florida (military)	Firing squad	Arthur T. Brown, Andrew Gibson, Leroy E. Greene, Charles A. Horn, and Eugene A. Washington Jr. were executed for rape and mutiny in 1944.
Stealing, treason, and conduct unbecoming a slave	Amy Spain	Black	17	March 10, 1865	Confederate South Carolina (military)	Hanging	Executed under Confederate authority.
Counterfeiting	John Richardson	White	30	August 22, 1862	Confederate Virginia (federal)	Hanging	Thomas Davis was hanged for counterfeiting by the state of Alabama on October 11, 1822.
Treason	William Bruce Mumford (Note: John Conn and four other persons were executed for treason on 1862 in Texas, under Confederate authority.)	White	42	June 7, 1862	Union-occupied New Orleans, Louisiana (military)	Hanging	Mumford was executed for tearing down a U.S. flag.
Piracy	Nathaniel Gordon	White	30	February 21, 1862	New York (federal)	Hanging	Gordon was executed for slave trading, which was defined as piracy when the perpetrator was an American citizen, and therefore subject to the same sentence.
Slave revolt	Caesar, Sam, and Sanford (slaves)	Black	Unknown	October 19, 1860	Alabama (state)	Hanging	
Aiding a runaway slave	Starling (or Sterling) Clayton and Martin Carter	White	Unknown	February 25, 1859	South Carolina (state)	Hanging	
Theft	Jake (slave)	Black	Unknown	December 3, 1855	Alabama (state)	Hanging	
Horse theft (grand larceny)	Theodore Velenquez	Hispanic	Unknown	January 30, 1852	California (state)	Hanging	
Forgery	Ray	White	Unknown	March 6, 1840	South Carolina (state)	Hanging	
Counterfeiting	Thomas Davis	White	60	October 11, 1822	Alabama (state)	Hanging	John Richardson was hanged for counterfeiting by the Confederate government in Virginia on August 22, 1862.
Bestiality	Joseph Ross	White	Unknown	1785	Pennsylvania (state)	Hanging	
Concealing the birth/death of an infant	Hannah Piggen	Native American	Unknown	1785	Massachusetts (state)	Hanging	The baby was born alive and murdered by Piggen.
Witchcraft	Mary Parker, Alice Parker, Mary Eastey, Martha Corey, Ann Pudeator, Wilmot Redd, Margaret Scott, and Samuel Wardwell	White	Unknown	September 22, 1692	Massachusetts Bay (colony)	Hanging	Last executions of the Salem witch trials.
Incest	Thomas Rood	White	46	October 18, 1672	Connecticut Colony (colony)	Hanging	Only execution for incest in the United States. Thomas Rood's intellectually disabled daughter, Sarah Rood, whom he was convicted of having sexual relations with and who had fathered his child, was also tried for incest and pleaded guilty. However, Sarah was spared execution and instead flogged after the court found that her father had been raping her.
Sodomy	Jan Creoli (Note: On 1801, soldier Jose Antonio Rosas was shot for sodomy in Spanish California.)	Black	Unknown	March 25, 1646	New Netherland (colony)	Garroting	Creoli was caught having illicit sexual relations with 10-year-old Manuel Congo, a fellow slave. Manuel was sentenced to flogging.
Adultery	Mary Latham and John Britton	White	18 (Lantham)	March 21, 1643	Massachusetts Bay (colony)	Hanging	

== See also ==
- Capital punishment in the United States
