= James Cobern =

American robber (1924–1964)

- Born: James Willard Cobern; January 31, 1924; Chilton County, Alabama, U.S.
- Died: September 4, 1964 (aged 40); Kilby Correctional Facility, Alabama, U.S.
- Occupation: Handyman
- Status: Executed by electrocution
- Conviction: Robbery
- Penalty: Death

James Willard Cobern (January 31, 1924 – September 4, 1964) was an American convicted robber executed in Alabama. On December 6, 1959, at a cafe in Selma, Alabama, Cobern, a World War II veteran, robbed his ex-girlfriend, 45-year-old Mamie Belle Walker, of her automobile and her jewelry, before he raped and murdered her. Cobern was charged with robbery, rape and murder, but was ultimately put on trial for solely the robbery charge, and sentenced to death. Cobern, who was executed by the electric chair on September 4, 1964, was the last person to be executed for robbery in the United States.

== Murder of Mamia Belle Walker ==
On the night of December 5, 1959, 35-year-old James Willard Cobern entered a local cafe in Selma, Alabama, which was operated by his 45-year-old ex-girlfriend Mamie Belle Walker. At around 10pm, Cobern was the last person together with Walker in the cafe, after two other men, John Rasberry and Leighton Tyus, departed the premises.

After which, during the early morning of December 6, 1959, Cobern initiated a violent attack on Walker inside her bedroom adjoining the cafe, raping her and also clubbed her on the head several times. Cobern additionally used a rifle to shoot Walker in the chest, and Walker died at the end of the assault. After the murder, Cobern stole some of Walker's jewelry and her 1957 Chevrolet automobile, and drove off the cafe in the automobile to escape the crime scene.

The body of Walker was found several hours after she was murdered. According to an autopsy report, Walker's skull was severely fractured into pieces, and she sustained a single 22-caliber rifle bullet wound in the chest, which went through her body, and these aforementioned wounds were sufficient to cause death. Additionally, the report stated that Walker's body was heavily bruised and mutilated, and there was puncturing of her vaginal area, likely caused by a poker recovered at the scene, and there was confirmation that she was sexually abused before her death.

After some investigations, Cobern was identified as the suspect and the Federal Bureau of Investigation (FBI) deployed its agents to conduct a manhunt for Cobern. Cobern was eventually arrested on December 10, 1959, in Chicago, Illinois, where he was sighted in Walker's automobile 40 minutes prior to his capture. Upon receiving word of Cobern's arrest, Circuit Solicitor Blanchard McLeod and Sheriff Jim Clark travelled from Alabama to Chicago to facilitate the extradition of Cobern back to Alabama for investigations and trial.

== Robbery trial ==
After his return to Alabama, James Cobern was charged with the robbery and murder of Mamie Belle Walker. In January 1960, Cobern was formally indicted for charges of robbery, larceny and murder by a Dallas County grand jury, and in March 1960, Cobern was declared mentally competent to stand trial for the killing of Walker.

On May 10, 1960, Cobern stood trial before a jury at the Dallas County Circuit Court. However, the trial proceeded with only the charge of robbery preferred against Cobern for stealing Walker's automobile, but not the charge of murder for Walker's killing. The prosecution, led by Circuit Solicitor Blanchard L. McLeod, sought the death penalty for Cobern on the robbery charge. Under Alabama state laws back then, robbery was considered a capital offence if violence was used.

On May 12, 1960, Cobern was found guilty of robbery as charged by the jury. Later that same day, the jury deliberated for 30 minutes before deciding to impose the death penalty for Cobern.

On June 2, 1960, Cobern was sentenced to death via the electric chair by Circuit Court Judge James A. Hare. Two months later, on August 5, 1960, Cobern was officially transferred to death row at the Kilby Correctional Facility. He was the first White person to receive the death penalty for robbery in the history of Dallas County.

== Appeals and execution stays ==
On April 5, 1962, the Alabama Supreme Court rejected Cobern's direct appeal against his death sentence, and his death sentence was scheduled to be carried out on May 25, 1962. However, Cobern's lawyers filed a petition for a re-hearing of the appeal, and the execution was stayed as a result.

On June 29, 1962, the Alabama Supreme Court denied a re-hearing of Cobern's appeal, and an execution date was set on September 7, 1962. However, Cobern was granted a 30-day reprieve from Governor John M. Patterson on September 5, 1962. The date was later postponed to October 5, 1962, and Patterson dismissed Cobern's clemency plea on September 29, 1962.

On October 4, 1962, the eve of Cobern's scheduled execution, his lawyers secured a stay of execution from the Alabama Supreme Court, and while a new appeal was pending, Cobern's execution date was pushed back to December 7, 1962. On December 5, 1962, two days before Cobern's scheduled execution, he was granted a stay of execution by the Alabama Supreme Court.

On January 10, 1963, the Alabama Supreme Court dismissed Cobern's motion for a new trial, and re-scheduled a new execution date of March 8, 1963. Subsequently, the execution was re-scheduled on April 19, 1963, but Governor George Wallace, who succeeded Patterson as governor, issued a stay of execution on April 17, 1963, so that he could have more time consider the possibility of clemency for Cobern.

Two months later, Cobern was slated to be executed on June 28, 1963, and Cobern filed for clemency from the governor, on account of his exemplary military service during World War II. That same month, Cobern was one of five at risk of imminent execution in Alabama, and he was the only White person among the five in line for imminent execution. Two days before he could be executed, Cobern was issued a reprieve by Wallace, and the execution was stayed until July 19, 1963. On July 17, 1963, two days before he was slated to die in the electric chair, Wallace granted a stay of execution for Cobern, whose original execution date was postponed to August 30, 1963. However, the execution did not proceed as scheduled and as of December 1963, Cobern was one of ten prisoners awaiting execution in Alabama.

By March 1964, Cobern's execution date was scheduled on June 5, 1964, and he was one of 14 men awaiting execution on Alabama's death row. On June 4, 1964, the eve of Cobern's impending execution, Wallace issued a 60-day reprieve for Cobern, with effect until August 7, 1964. As of June 1964, Cobern was one of 16 prisoners remaining on death row in Alabama.

== Execution ==
Two months after his execution was stayed, James Cobern's execution was re-scheduled to be carried out on August 21, 1964. However, Cobern again received a temporary reprieve from Alabama Governor George Wallace.

The execution was eventually re-scheduled on September 4, 1964. As a final recourse to avoid execution, Cobern petitioned for a pardon from Wallace, who previously stayed his execution 11 times, and should Wallace grant him clemency, Cobern's death sentence would be commuted to life imprisonment. On the night of September 3, 1964, the eve of Cobern's execution, Wallace declined to commute the death sentence of Cobern and therefore denied him clemency.

On September 4, 1964, 40-year-old James Willard Cobern was put to death by the electric chair at the Kilby Correctional Facility. Prior to his execution, Cobern ordered a last meal of fried chicken, French fried potatoes, rolls, milk, coffee and coconut cream pie. Cobern was also attended by three ministers, including a prison chaplain, and he shook hands with the prison warden, minister and several guards and he continued to smile and chat while being strapped to the chair. His last words were, "Everything's all right." Cobern was the first inmate to be executed under the governorship of Wallace.

Cobern was the last person executed in the United States for robbery. He was also the final individual executed for a crime other than murder, although the robbery in his case involved the rape and killing of the victim. Prior to Cobern's execution, the last person put to death for a robbery in which the victim did not die was Herbert Bradley, who was executed by electrocution in Texas on May 16, 1962.

Furthermore, Cobern was the second-to-last prisoner executed in Alabama before the 1972 U.S. moratorium on capital punishment. The final execution prior to the moratorium was that of convicted murderer William Frank Bowen Jr., who was put to death on January 15, 1965. The moratorium was lifted in 1976 and the death penalty was reinstated in Alabama, and executions officially resumed with that of John Louis Evans on April 22, 1983.

== See also ==
- Capital punishment in Alabama
- List of people executed by electrocution
- List of people executed in Alabama (pre-1972)
- List of people executed in the United States in 1964
- List of last executions in the United States by crime
