= Flint Hall =

Flint Hall may refer to:

- Flint Hall (Gainesville, Florida), historic building on the University of Florida campus, listed on the National Register of Historic Places (NRHP)
- Heritage Hall (Valparaiso University), Indiana, originally known as Flint Hall
- Flint Hall, Syracuse, New York, historic building on the campus of Syracuse University

== See also ==
- The Flint Estate, Antrim, New Hampshire, NRHP-listed in Hillsborough County
- Flint Farm, Andover, Massachusetts, NRHP-listed
- Flint House (Massachusetts), Lincoln, Massachusetts, NRHP-listed
