= Harnden =

Harnden is a surname. Notable people with the surname include:

- Arthur Harnden (1924–2016), American sprinter
- E. J. Harnden (born 1983), Canadian curler
- Henry Harnden (1823–1900), Union Army general
- Iain Harnden (born 1976), Zimbabwean hurdler
- Ken Harnden (born 1973), Zimbabwean hurdler
- Ryan Harnden (born 1986), Canadian curler
- Toby Harnden (born 1966), English journalist and writer
- William F. Harnden (1812–1845), American businessman

== See also ==
- Harnden Tavern, historic tavern in Wilmington, Massachusetts
- Harnden Farm, historic farmhouse in Andover, Massachusetts
