= Andover National Bank =

- U.S. National Register of Historic Places
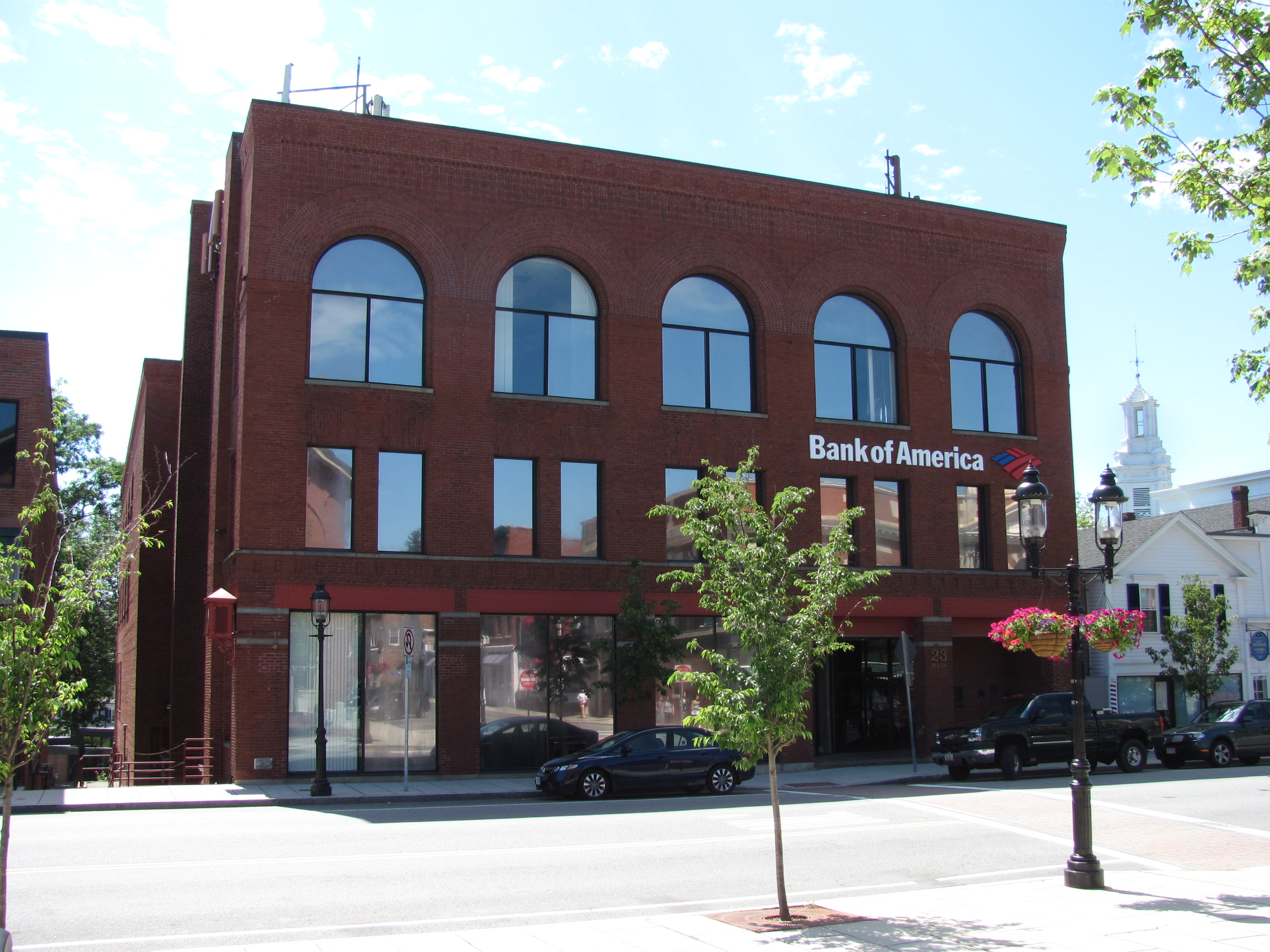
- Andover National Bank Building

- Location within Massachusetts Location within the United States
- Location: Andover, Massachusetts
- Coordinates: 42°39′20″N 71°8′26″W
- Built: 1890
- Architect: Hartwell and Richardson; Hardy & Cole
- Architectural style: Romanesque
- MPS: Town of Andover MRA
- NRHP reference No.: 82001907
- Added to NRHP: June 10, 1982

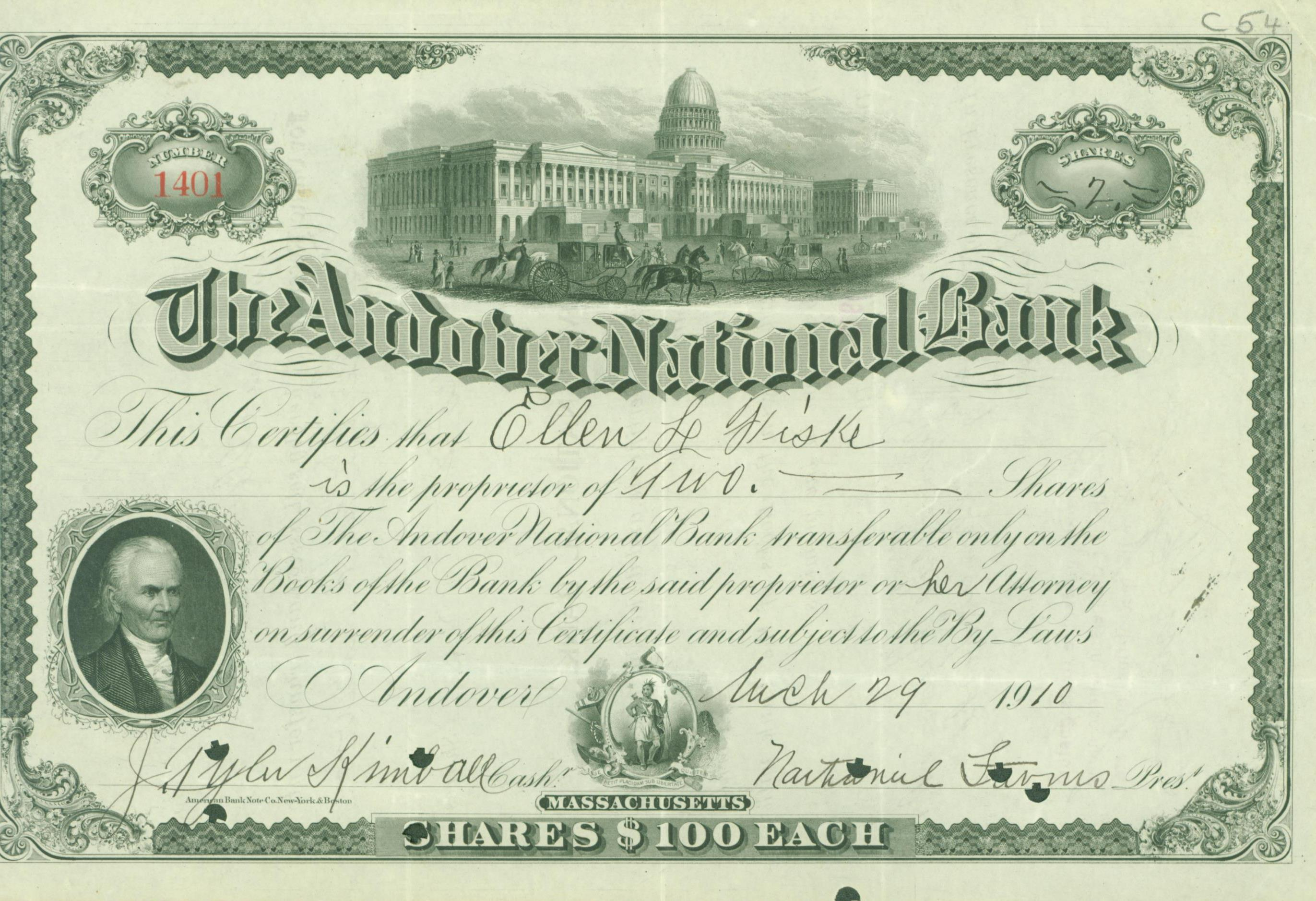
Share of the Andover National Bank, issued 29 March 1910

The Andover National Bank building is a historic bank building at 23 Main Street in Andover, Massachusetts. The brick Romanesque Revival building occupies a prominent place in Andover center, opposite the town hall. It was designed by Hartwell and Richardson and built by the local firm of Hardy and Cole. It was completed in 1890. Its first tenants, in addition to the bank, were the Andover Savings Bank, local offices of the Merrimack Fire Insurance Company, and the local Masonic lodge.

The building was listed on the National Register of Historic Places in 1982.

== See also ==
- National Register of Historic Places listings in Andover, Massachusetts
- National Register of Historic Places listings in Essex County, Massachusetts
