= Manning House =

Manning House may refer to:

- One of three main buildings housing the University of Sydney Union in Sydney, Australia
- Florida House on Capitol Hill in Washington, D.C.
- Manning House, the former mayoral mansion in Tucson, Arizona designed by Trost & Trost
- Manning House (Andover, Massachusetts), an 18th-century colonial residence
