= Asa and Sylvester Abbot House =

Historic house in Massachusetts, United States

- U.S. National Register of Historic Places
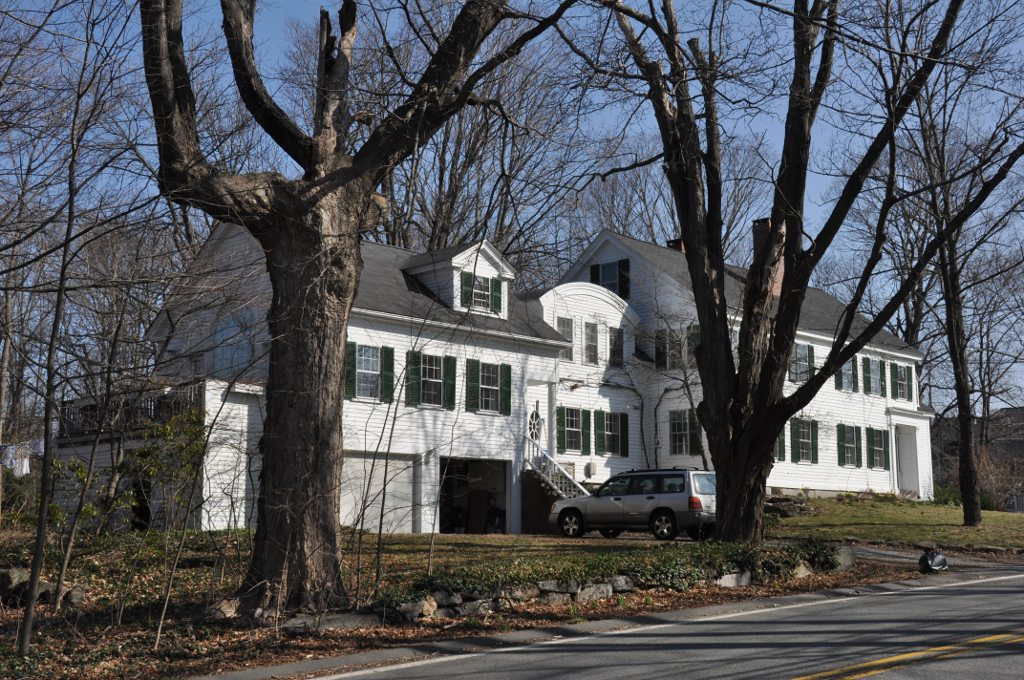

- Location within Massachusetts Location within the United States
- Location: 15–17 Porter Rd., Andover, Massachusetts
- Coordinates: 42°38′21″N 71°8′8″W
- Built: 1830
- Architect: Abbott, Asa
- Architectural style: Greek Revival
- MPS: Town of Andover MRA
- NRHP reference No.: 82004833
- Added to NRHP: June 10, 1982

The Asa and Sylvester Abbot House is a historic two-family house at 15–17 Porter Road in Andover, Massachusetts. Built in the 1830s, it is a rare local example of the duplex in a rural setting. It was listed on the National Register of Historic Places in 1982, where it is incorrectly listed at 15–17 Andover Street.

== Description and history ==
The Asa and Sylvester Abbot House stands in what is now a residential area, south of downtown Andover and the Phillips Academy campus, on the northwest side of Porter Road, just north of its junction with Karlton Circle. It is a 2 1/2-story wood-frame structure, with a side-gable roof, two central chimneys (one on each side of the roof ridge), and a clapboarded exterior. The front facade is symmetrical and six bays across, with entrances in the outer bays. Each entrance is recessed with sidelight windows, and the recess is framed by pilasters, entablature, and gabled pediment. Period single-story ells extend to either side, with later additions further extending the house in both directions.

The house was built in the 1830s by Asa Abbot, a farmer and member of the locally prominent Abbot family. He left the house to his sons, Sylvester and Asa Albert Abbot, who farmed the surrounding land until the turn of the 20th century. The house is a good local example of Greek Revival architecture, and is particularly rare as a duplex in a setting that was rural at the time of its construction.

== See also ==
- National Register of Historic Places listings in Andover, Massachusetts
- National Register of Historic Places listings in Essex County, Massachusetts
