= Barnard Block =

- U.S. National Register of Historic Places
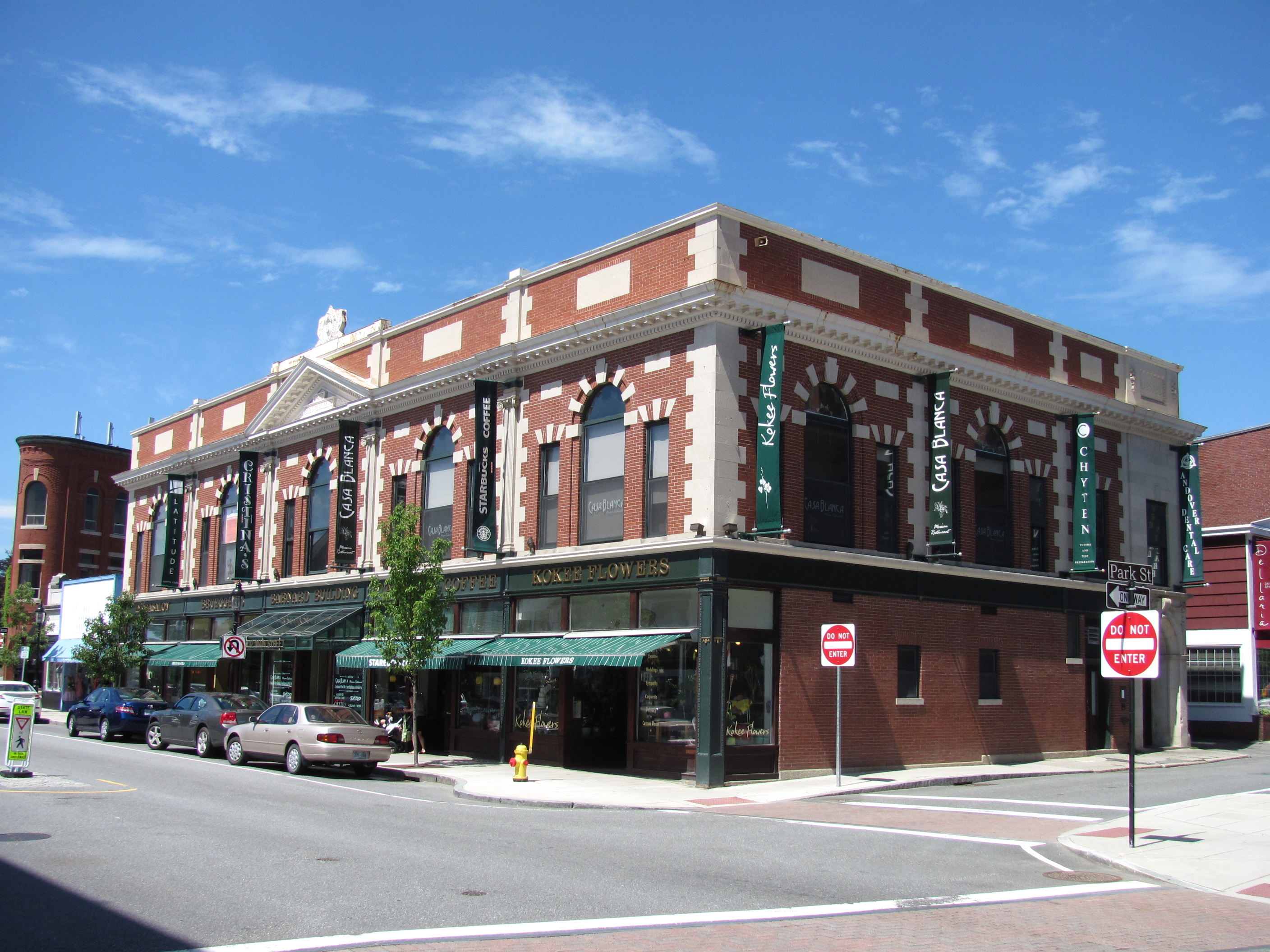
- Barnard Block

- Location within Massachusetts Location within the United States
- Location: Andover, Massachusetts
- Coordinates: 42°39′22″N 71°8′26″W
- Built: 1910; 116 years ago
- Architect: Barnard, Henry W.
- Architectural style: Classical Revival
- MPS: Town of Andover MRA
- NRHP reference No.: 82004803
- Added to NRHP: June 10, 1982

The Barnard Block is a historic commercial block at 10–16 Main Street in the center of Andover, Massachusetts. The two story brick and stone building was built in 1910 for Henry Barnard, son and business partner of Jacob W. Barnard, a successful local shoemaker. This building was one of a number of family investments. It features elaborate Colonial Revival detailing, include creative use of multicolored stonework, Palladian windows, and a central triangular pediment on the Main Street facade.

The building was listed on the National Register of Historic Places in 1982.

== See also ==
- National Register of Historic Places listings in Andover, Massachusetts
- National Register of Historic Places listings in Essex County, Massachusetts
