= Holt-Cummings-Davis House =

Historic house in Massachusetts, United States

- U.S. National Register of Historic Places
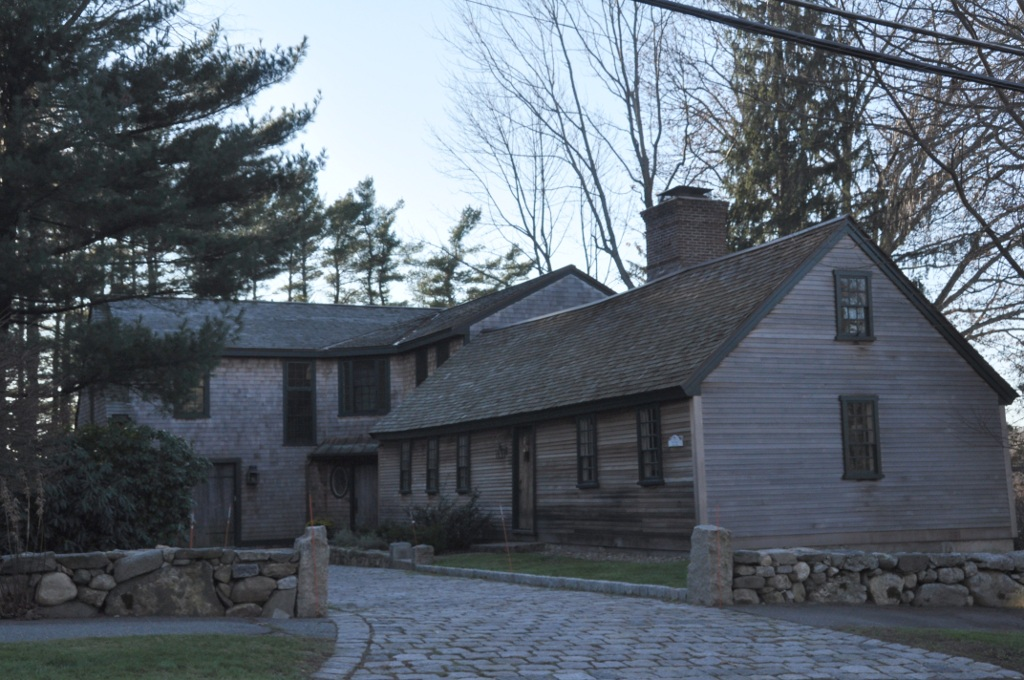

- Location within Massachusetts Location within the United States
- Location: 67 Salem Street, Andover, Massachusetts
- Coordinates: 42°38′38″N 71°7′31″W
- Built: 1700
- Architectural style: Georgian
- MPS: Town of Andover MRA
- NRHP reference No.: 82004820
- Added to NRHP: June 10, 1982

The Holt-Cummings-Davis House is a historic house located in Andover, Massachusetts. It is estimated to have been built around 1700 at a location across the street, and nothing is known of its owners at the time. The first recorded owner was William Hawley, who bought it in 1803. It was purchased in 1835 by Job Abbott as a wedding present for his daughter Lucy, who married Joseph Holt. Under their ownership it was moved to its present location, and a new house was built on the old site. This house was next owned by Daniel Cummings, who married into the Holt family. In 1895 the property was bought by Augustus Davis, whose family owned it until 1935. The house itself is an unusual 1 1/2-story First Period house, six irregularly spaced bays wide, with a slightly off-center chimney. The house has been restored, and a large modern addition has been added to its west end.

The house was listed on the National Register of Historic Places in 1982.

== See also ==
- National Register of Historic Places listings in Andover, Massachusetts
- National Register of Historic Places listings in Essex County, Massachusetts
