= Woodbridge House (Andover, Massachusetts) =

Historic house in Massachusetts, United States

- U.S. National Register of Historic Places
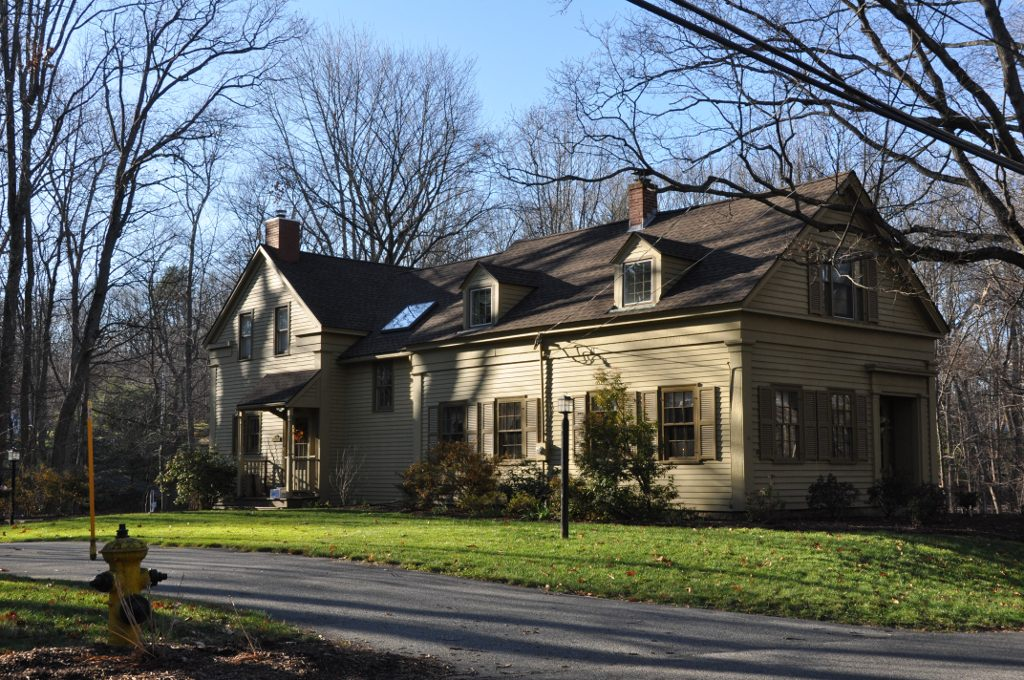

- Location within Massachusetts Location within the United States
- Location: 293 Salem Street, Andover, Massachusetts
- Coordinates: 42°37′59″N 71°6′40″W
- Built: 1847
- Architectural style: Greek Revival
- MPS: Town of Andover MRA
- NRHP reference No.: 82004813
- Added to NRHP: June 10, 1982

The Woodbridge House is a historic house in Andover, Massachusetts. It was built for George Woodbridge, a cordwainer, sometime between 1847 and 1852. The financially troubled Woodbridge sold the property in 1853, and has been through a succession of owners since. The house is notable for Greek Revival styling that is comparatively elaborate for a rural setting and a house of modest means.

The house was listed on the National Register of Historic Places (as "Woodridge House") in 1982.

== See also ==
- National Register of Historic Places listings in Andover, Massachusetts
- National Register of Historic Places listings in Essex County, Massachusetts
