= Rogers–Downing House =

Historic house in Massachusetts, United States

- U.S. National Register of Historic Places
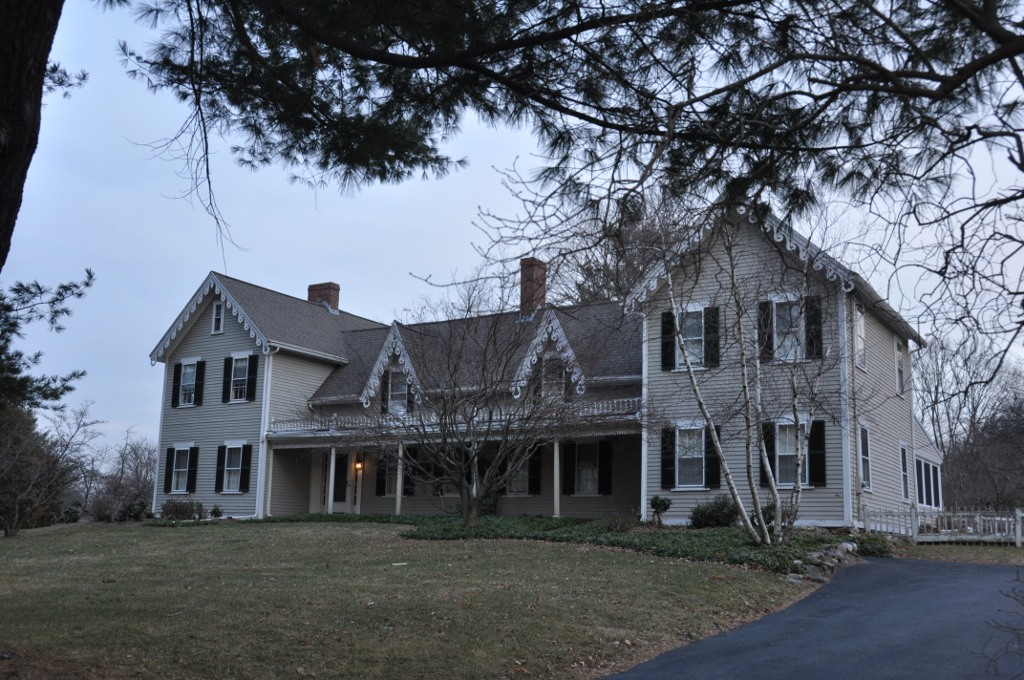

- Location within Massachusetts Location within the United States
- Location: 269 Highland Road, Andover, Massachusetts
- Coordinates: 42°39′35″N 71°7′10″W
- Built: 1850
- Architectural style: Gothic Revival
- MPS: Town of Andover MRA
- NRHP reference No.: 82004802
- Added to NRHP: June 10, 1982

The Rogers–Downing House is a historic house in Andover, Massachusetts. It was built between 1848 and 1852 as the country house for Benjamin Rogers, a wealthy Boston businessman. After Rogers sold it in 1870, it went through a succession of owners before coming into the hands of John Downing, who established a dairy farm and orchard on the estate. Their family retained the house until 1968. The house is an unusual example of a Gothic Revival summer house. Its shape is that of an H, with two 2 1/2-story wings connected by a 1 1/2-story connecting section. The gable ends of the side wings face the street, as do two gable dormers on the cross section. These are decorated with bargeboard trim, a typical Gothic Revival detail. The house sits prominently on a rise above Highland Road.

The house was listed on the National Register of Historic Places in 1982.

== See also ==
- National Register of Historic Places listings in Andover, Massachusetts
- National Register of Historic Places listings in Essex County, Massachusetts
