= J. T. Abbot House =

Historic house in Massachusetts, United States

- U.S. National Register of Historic Places
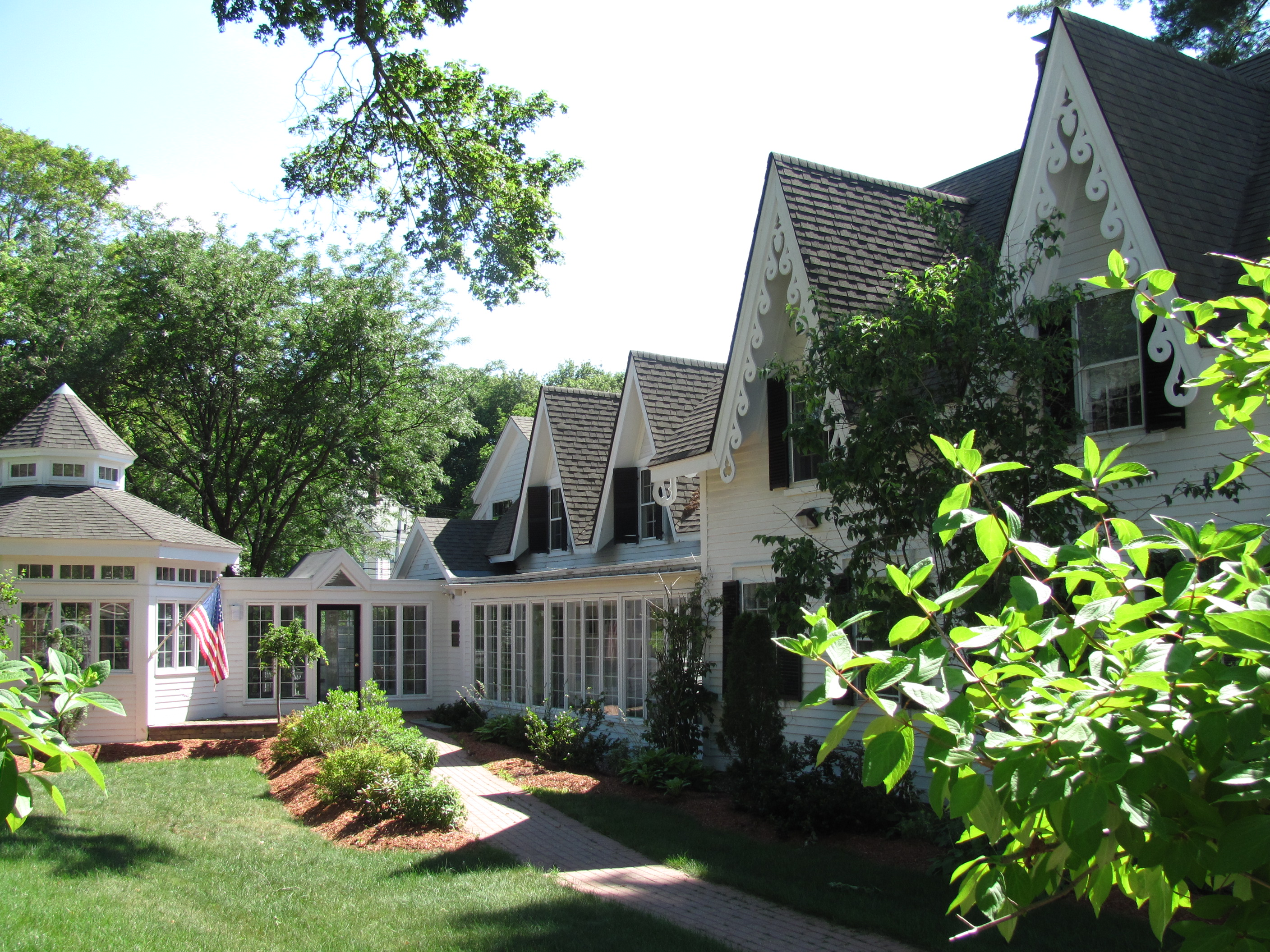
- J. T. Abbot House

- Location within Massachusetts Location within the United States
- Location: Andover, Massachusetts
- Coordinates: 42°39′23″N 71°8′37″W
- Area: less than one acre
- Built: 1844
- Architect: Chickering, Joseph
- Architectural style: Gothic Revival
- MPS: Town of Andover MRA
- NRHP reference No.: 82004814
- Added to NRHP: June 10, 1982

The J. T. Abbot House is a historic house at 34 Essex Street in Andover, Massachusetts. The Gothic Revival house was built in the late 1840s for Joseph Thompson Abbot by Jacob Chickering, a leading local real estate developer and builder of the mid-19th century. The ornamental detailing is among the most elaborate of the time in the town. The house was listed on the National Register of Historic Places in 1982.

== Description and history ==
The Abbot House is set on the south side of Essex Street, a through street lined by a mix of commercial and residential buildings, not far from the center of Andover, Massachusetts. The house is a 1 1/2-story wood-frame structure, with a steeply pitched front gable roof and two side-facing cross gables on its main block, and another two on an addition that extends to the rear. The side-facing gables of the main block, along with its main gable, are ornamented with jigsawn bargeboard trim. The main gable has a short lancet-arched window at the attic level. The front facade is two bays wide, with a projecting polygonal bay window in the left bay and the front door in the right bay, sheltered by a portico. Both the portico and bay window are topped by scroll-sawn decorative woodwork.

The land on which the house stands was purchased by Jacob Chickering, one of Andover's leading mid-19th century developers, in 1844. Chickering sold the lot, with the house on it, in 1850 to Joseph Thompson Abbot. In 1878 Chickering was contracted to construct a picket fence for the property. The house has had a number of owners, and may have been rented by the local Baptist church as a parsonage for a time. It presently houses a law office.

== See also ==
- National Register of Historic Places listings in Andover, Massachusetts
- National Register of Historic Places listings in Essex County, Massachusetts
