= Nathan Frye House =

Historic house in Massachusetts, United States

- U.S. National Register of Historic Places
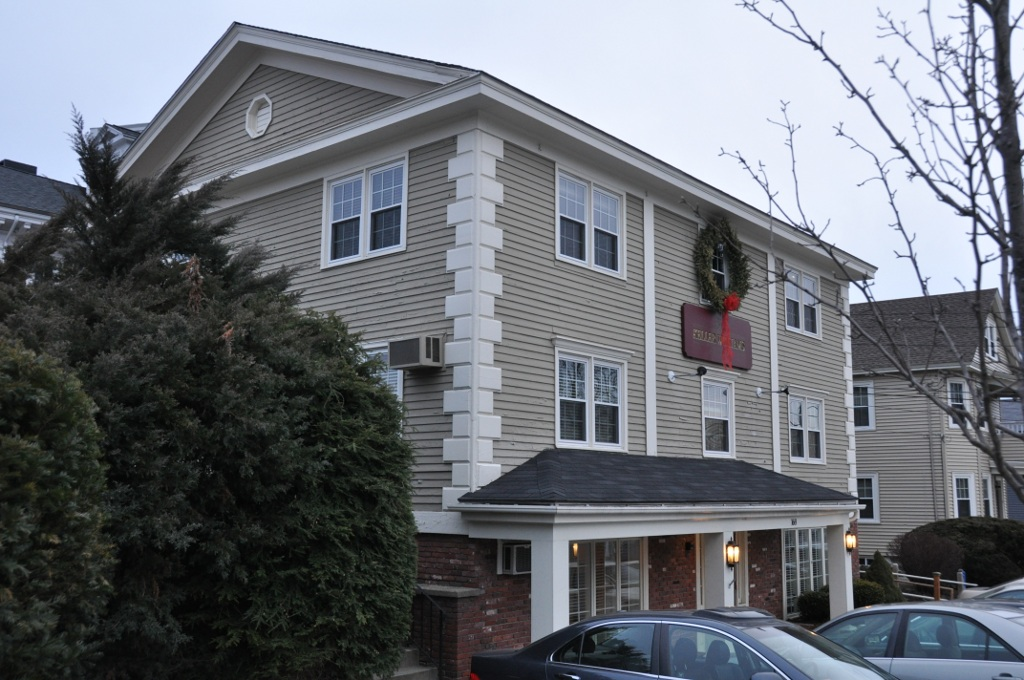

- Location within Massachusetts Location within the United States
- Location: 166 N. Main Street, Andover, Massachusetts
- Coordinates: 42°39′42″N 71°8′42″W
- Built: 1851
- Architectural style: Italianate
- MPS: Town of Andover MRA
- NRHP reference No.: 82004824
- Added to NRHP: June 10, 1982

The Nathan Frye House is a historic house in Andover, Massachusetts. The large mansion was built in 1851-52 for Nathan Frye, who had recently (1849) become president of the Marland Mill Company, one of Andover's major textile firms. It features grand Italianate details, including bracketed eaves, corner quoins, and pedimented gables. The building and its associated carriage house have been extensively altered for commercial purposes in the late 20th century, but much of the architectural interest has been retained.

The house was listed on the National Register of Historic Places in 1982.

== See also ==
- National Register of Historic Places listings in Andover, Massachusetts
- National Register of Historic Places listings in Essex County, Massachusetts
