= Osgood Farm =

- U.S. National Register of Historic Places
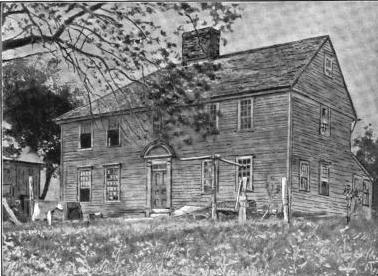
- Undated, prior to 1893

- Location within Massachusetts Location within the United States
- Location: 116 Osgood Street, Andover, Massachusetts
- Coordinates: 42°38′12″N 71°11′33″W
- Built: 1700
- Architectural style: Georgian
- MPS: Town of Andover MRA
- NRHP reference No.: 82004806
- Added to NRHP: June 10, 1982

Osgood Farm is a historic farmhouse in Andover, Massachusetts.

== History ==
The oldest part of the house was built after the 1699 marriage of Stephen Osgood and Hannah Blanchard. Her father donated the land and his father donated the funds to construct the house. In 1783 American Revolution patriot, James Otis, Jr. was recovering at the house as a guest of Jacob Osgood when he was struck and killed by lightning in the threshold to the home. The house remained in the Osgood family until 1849. For several years in the nineteenth century it was used as an inn and tavern. The house was listed on the National Register of Historic Places in 1982.

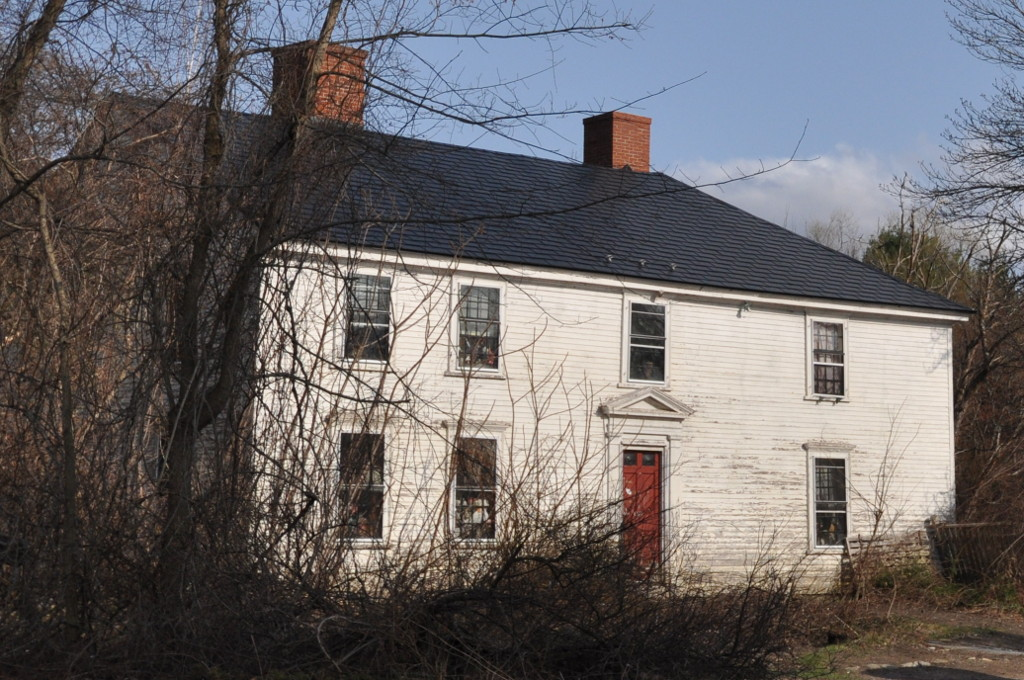
Osgood Farm, 2015

The house was originally four rooms built around a central chimney, a northeast wing was added around 1739, probably by Stephen Osgood's son, Isaac, a French and Indian War veteran. The original central chimney was removed c. 1925 after it caused a fire. The house had several modifications made after the fire.

== See also ==
- National Register of Historic Places listings in Andover, Massachusetts
- National Register of Historic Places listings in Essex County, Massachusetts
