= Dascomb House =

Historic house in Massachusetts, United States

- U.S. National Register of Historic Places
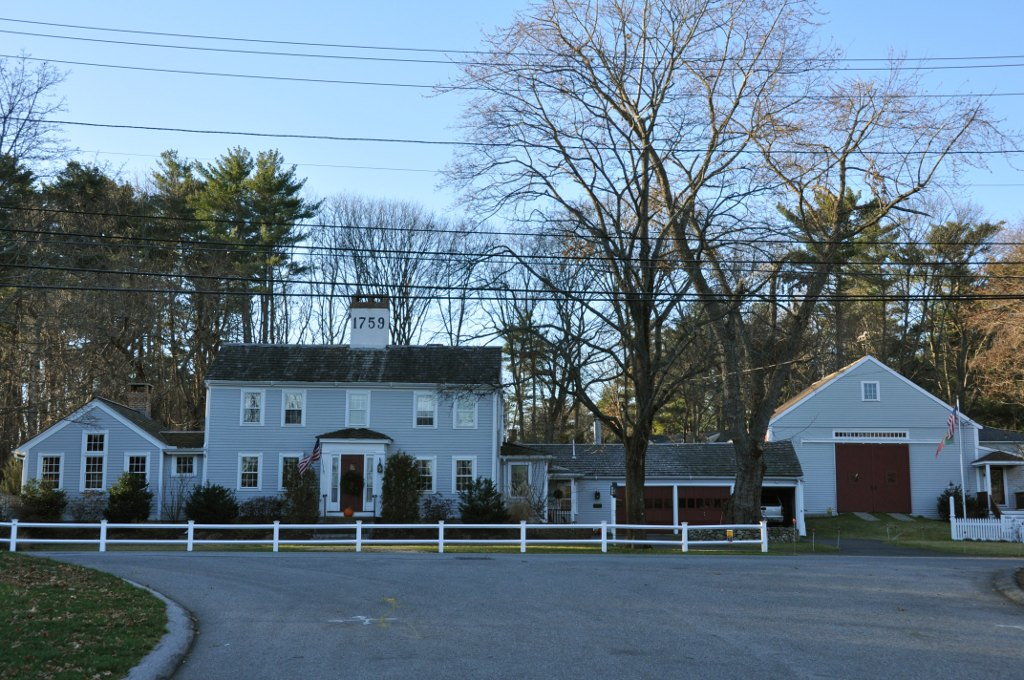

- Location within Massachusetts Location within the United States
- Location: Andover, Massachusetts
- Coordinates: 42°37′39″N 71°10′34″W
- Built: 1759
- Architect: Johnson, Jacob
- Architectural style: Mixed (more Than 2 Styles From Different Periods)
- MPS: Town of Andover MRA
- NRHP reference No.: 82004826
- Added to NRHP: June 10, 1982

The Dascomb House is a historic house at 125 Dascomb Road in Andover, Massachusetts. It was built c. 1760 by Jacob Johnson, a local blacksmith who had his shop on the property. It remained in the Johnson family until 1832, when it was deeded to Jacob Dascomb, deacon of the West Parish Church. He fell on financial hard times and sold the property in 1852, after which it has been through a long succession of owners.

The house is a typical 2 1/2-story center-chimney Georgian colonial. It was embellished at some point with Greek Revival details, and a front porch added around the turn of the 20th century has since been removed. The house was listed on the National Register of Historic Places in 1982.

== See also ==
- National Register of Historic Places listings in Andover, Massachusetts
- National Register of Historic Places listings in Essex County, Massachusetts
