= Pillsbury–French House =

Historic house in Massachusetts, United States

- U.S. National Register of Historic Places
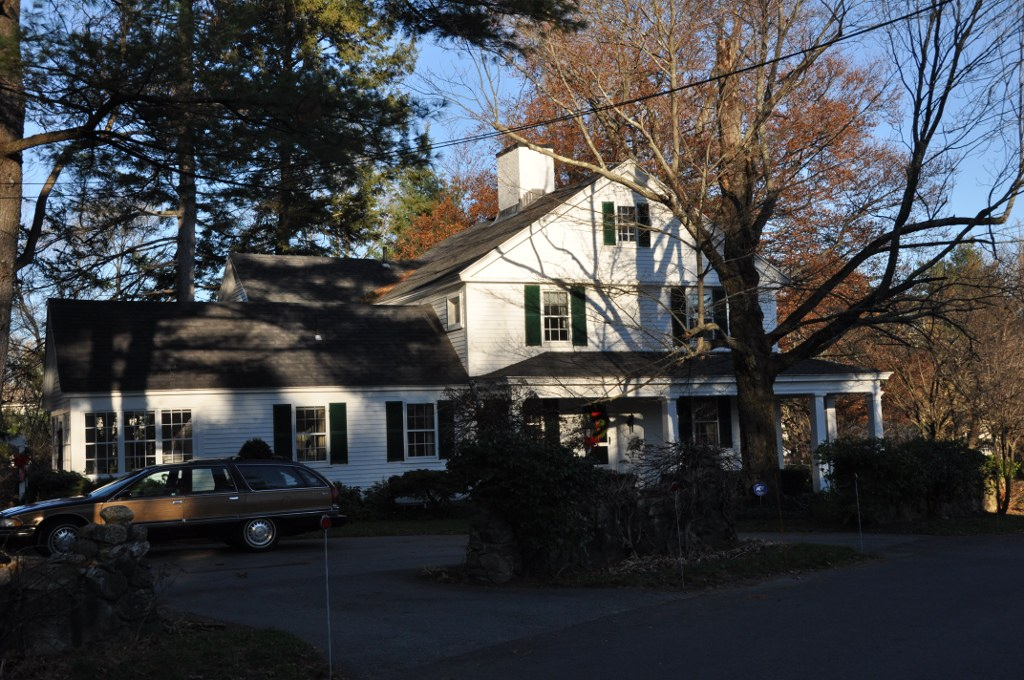

- Location within Massachusetts Location within the United States
- Location: 103 Dascomb Road, Andover, Massachusetts
- Coordinates: 42°37′48″N 71°10′27″W
- Built: 1790
- Architectural style: Greek Revival, Georgian
- MPS: Town of Andover MRA
- NRHP reference No.: 82004800
- Added to NRHP: June 10, 1982

The Pillsbury–French House is a historic house in Andover, Massachusetts, United States. It was built circa 1790 for William Clark of Tewksbury, but was sold at auction just a year later. The property was occupied by Jacob French, whose family bought the property in 1795 and kept it until 1841. It was purchased by Paul Pearson Pillsbury in 1843, and remained in his family until 1926. The building exhibits some classic Georgian features, which have been enhanced by Greek Revival alterations made at a later date.

The house was listed in the National Register of Historic Places in 1982.

== See also ==
- National Register of Historic Places listings in Andover, Massachusetts
- National Register of Historic Places listings in Essex County, Massachusetts
