= David Gray House =

Historic house in Massachusetts, United States

- U.S. National Register of Historic Places
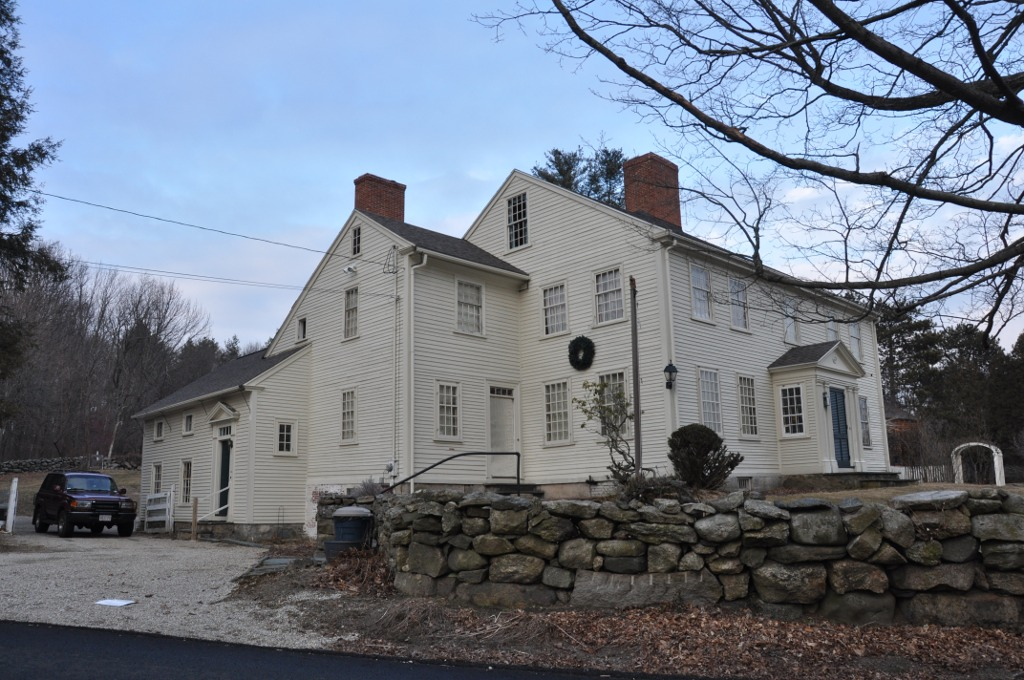

- Location within Massachusetts Location within the United States
- Location: 232 Salem Street, Andover, Massachusetts
- Coordinates: 42°38′8″N 70°33′23″W
- Built: 1812
- Architectural style: Georgian, Federal
- MPS: Town of Andover MRA
- NRHP reference No.: 82004823
- Added to NRHP: June 10, 1982

The David Gray House is a historic house in Andover, Massachusetts, United States. The 2 1/2-story colonial was built for David Gray, a local farmer, in about 1812, and it remained in his family until the 1930s. It is five bays wide, with a side gable roof, central chimney, and a projecting entry vestibule that has a door surround consisting of a pedimented top and fluted pilasters on the sides. Additions extend the house to the left.

The house was added to the National Register of Historic Places in 1982.

== See also ==
- National Register of Historic Places listings in Andover, Massachusetts
- National Register of Historic Places listings in Essex County, Massachusetts
