= Musgrove Block =

- U.S. National Register of Historic Places
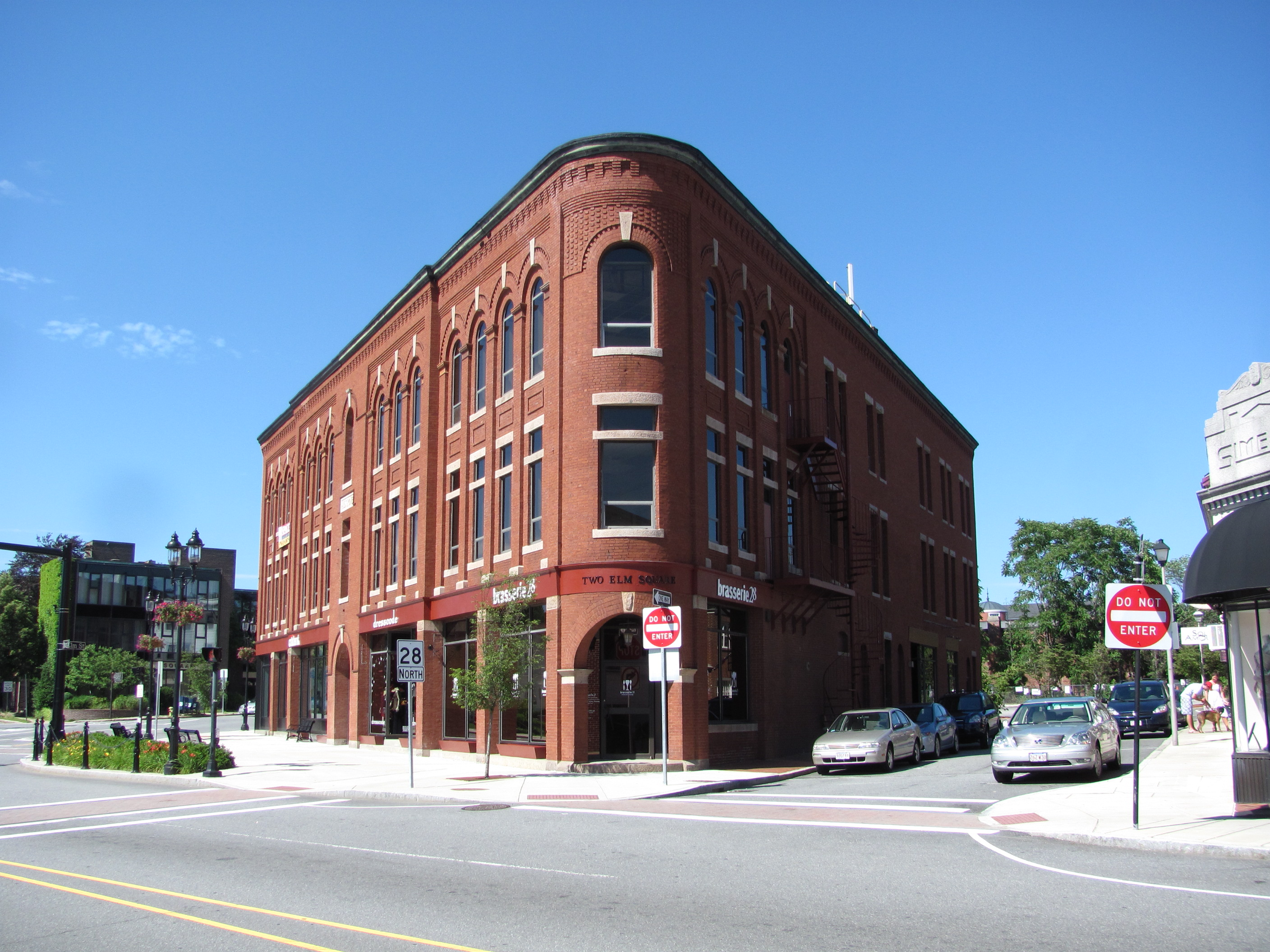

- Location within Massachusetts Location within the United States
- Location: Andover, Massachusetts
- Coordinates: 42°39′25″N 71°8′27″W
- Built: 1895
- Architect: John H. Flint
- Architectural style: Romanesque
- MPS: Town of Andover MRA
- NRHP reference No.: 82004816
- Added to NRHP: June 10, 1982

The Musgrove Block is a historic commercial building at 2 Main Street in the center of Andover, Massachusetts. The three-story brick building was built in 1895 on the site of a former town green, and forms part of Andover's central Elm Square intersection. The building exhibits Romanesque Revival styling, featuring granite trim elements and ornate brick detailing. It was listed on the National Register of Historic Places in 1982.

== Description and history ==
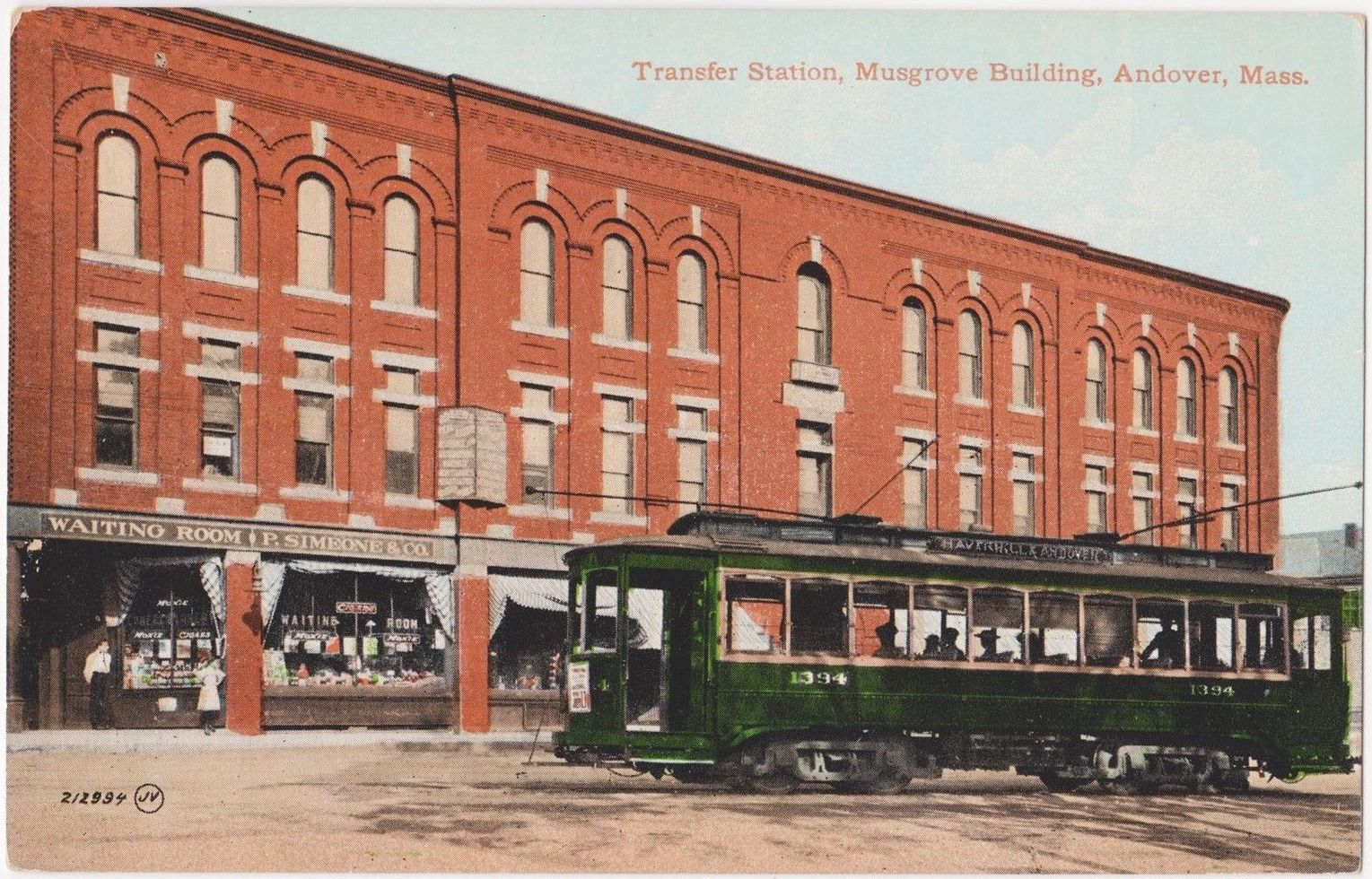
Early 20th century postcard of the Musgrove Block. The storefront at lower left served as a waiting room and transfer station for local trolley lines.

The Musgrove Block occupies most of a roughly trapezoidal lot on the east side of Elm Square, the six-way road intersection at the heart of downtown Andover. It is a three-story red brick building, with commercial storefronts in the ground level, and office space on the upper floors. The building presents a broad facade to the intersection, with a small plaza in front. This facade is 15 bays wide, with six storefronts and a building entrance. To its left is a facade facing Elm Street that has three bays on the upper levels, and two commercial bays on the ground floor. To the right of the main facade is a flatiron-style rounded corner of a single bay, leading to more service oriented sides of the building facing Post Office Avenue to the south and east. The ground floor store fronts are all plate glass with a band of signage above, with entrances that are recessed; the flatiron corner also has a store entrance. The main entrance to the upper floors is set in a rounded-arch opening, with transomed rectangular second floor windows and round-arched third floor windows. The windows of the upper floors are grouped into recessed panels with brick corbelling at the top, and are set in vertical pairs within tall keystoned arches. A band of corbelling serves as a cornice below the flat roof.

Prior to 1894, the area east of Elm Square was taken up by a town green and a hostelry variously known as the Eagle Hotel and the Elm Tavern. This property was purchased by John Field in 1894, and the tavern was razed. The present building was then erected on the former green, over community objections seeking its preservation as open space. The building's early occupants included a druggist who operated an ice cream counter, and a bicycle shop.

== See also ==
- National Register of Historic Places listings in Andover, Massachusetts
- National Register of Historic Places listings in Essex County, Massachusetts
