= Jehiel Cochran House =

Historic house in Massachusetts, United States

- U.S. National Register of Historic Places
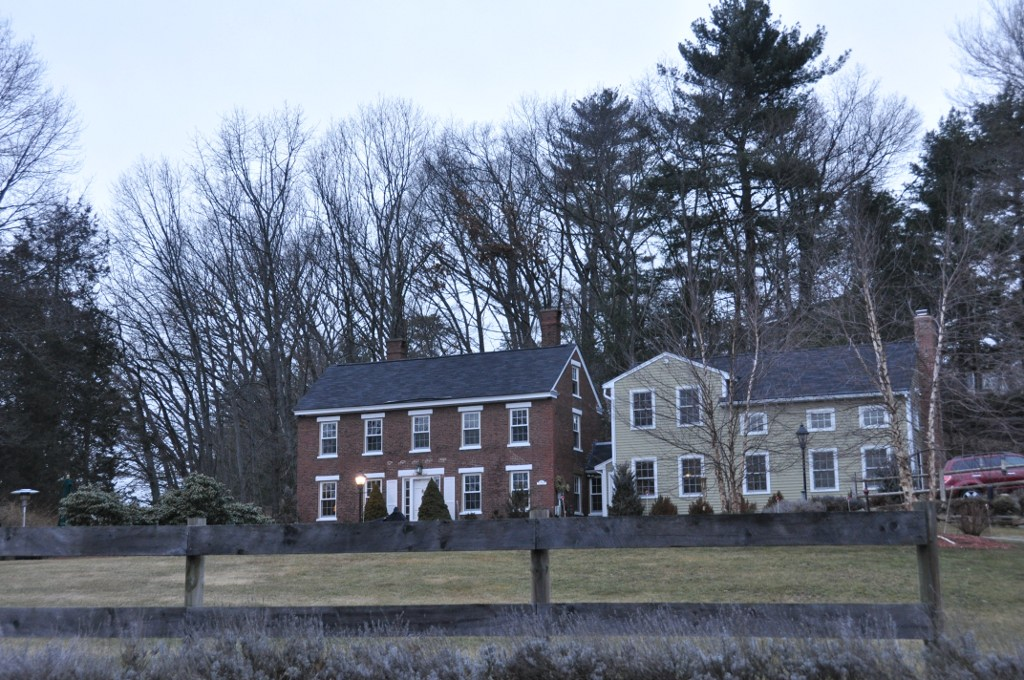

- Location within Massachusetts Location within the United States
- Location: Andover, Massachusetts
- Coordinates: 42°40′10″N 71°8′32″W
- Built: 1838
- Architect: Cochran, Jehiel
- Architectural style: Greek Revival
- MPS: Town of Andover MRA
- NRHP reference No.: 82004827
- Added to NRHP: June 10, 1982

The Jehiel Cochran House (also known locally as Brickhaven) is a historic house at 65 Burnham Road in Andover, Massachusetts. It is listed on the National Register of Historic Places and Massachusetts cultural inventory records at 63 Burnham Road, but by the Andover Historical Society at 65 Burnham Road. The house, built in the 1830s, is locally distinctive for its use of brick, and for its association with the Jehiel Cochran, the brickyard owner who built it. It was listed on the National Register in 1982.

== Description and history ==
The Cochran House is set back from the north side of Burnham Road, just east of its crossing of some railroad tracks. It is a rectangular brick structure, 2 1/2 stories high, with a side gable roof and twin interior chimneys. A large modern addition has been built to the right of the original structure that rivals it in size. The windows are six-over-six sash, with granite lintels, and the center entry is flanked by sidelight windows. The property also includes a small vintage barn.

The house, built in the 1830s, is uncommon because most houses in the area of that period were built of wood. Jehiel Cochran, the builder and owner, was an Andover native who owned a brickyard nearby. Cochran was apparently associated with the brickyard for some time, but was listed as a farmer when he died in 1860. The house he built is a well-executed conservative vernacular rendition of a transitional Federal-Greek Revival style.

== See also ==
- National Register of Historic Places listings in Andover, Massachusetts
- National Register of Historic Places listings in Essex County, Massachusetts
