= Russell House (Andover, Massachusetts) =

Historic house in Massachusetts, United States

- U.S. National Register of Historic Places
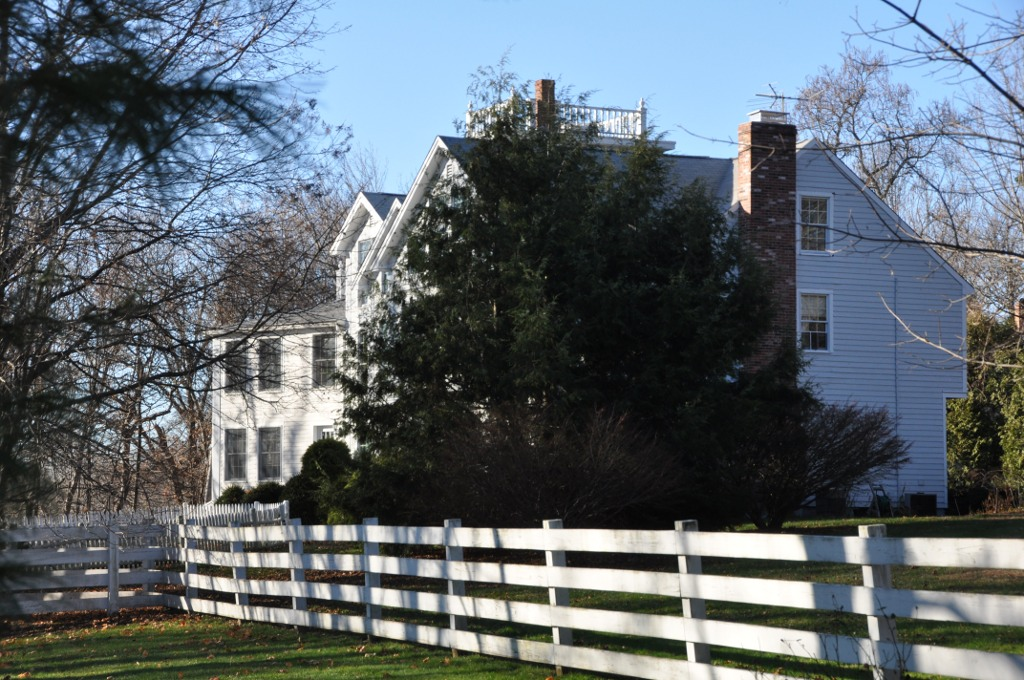

- Location within Massachusetts Location within the United States
- Location: 28 Rocky Hill Road, Andover, Massachusetts
- Coordinates: 42°37′5″N 71°7′14″W
- Built: 1805
- Architectural style: Federal
- MPS: Town of Andover MRA
- NRHP reference No.: 82004808
- Added to NRHP: June 10, 1982

The Russell House is a historic house in Andover, Massachusetts.

The weatherboarded Federal-style home was built in 1805. It was added to the National Register of Historic Places in 1982. The farm encompasses some 11 acres (4.5 ha). The house and farm were owned by Deacon Joseph Russell, a descendant of Robert Russell, a Scotsman, who emigrated to Massachusetts in the seventeenth century and was the first person buried in Andover's newly created South Parish 'Burying-Yard,' as it was called, in 1710 at age 80. Russell's descendants intermarried with the Holt, Abbott, Marshall, Chandler, Dane and other early Andover settler families. The 'Scotland District' name for that section of Andover derives from Robert Russell's Scottish birthplace, and his subsequent name for his landholding which he called 'Scotland farm.'

== See also ==
- National Register of Historic Places listings in Andover, Massachusetts
- National Register of Historic Places listings in Essex County, Massachusetts

== Sources ==
- Burke's American Families with British Ancestry: The Lineages of 1,600 Families of British Origin Now Resident in the United States of America, Bernard Burke, Republished by Genealogical Publishing Company, 1975, ISBN 0-8063-0662-9
