= Abbot-Baker House =

Historic house in Massachusetts, United States

- U.S. National Register of Historic Places
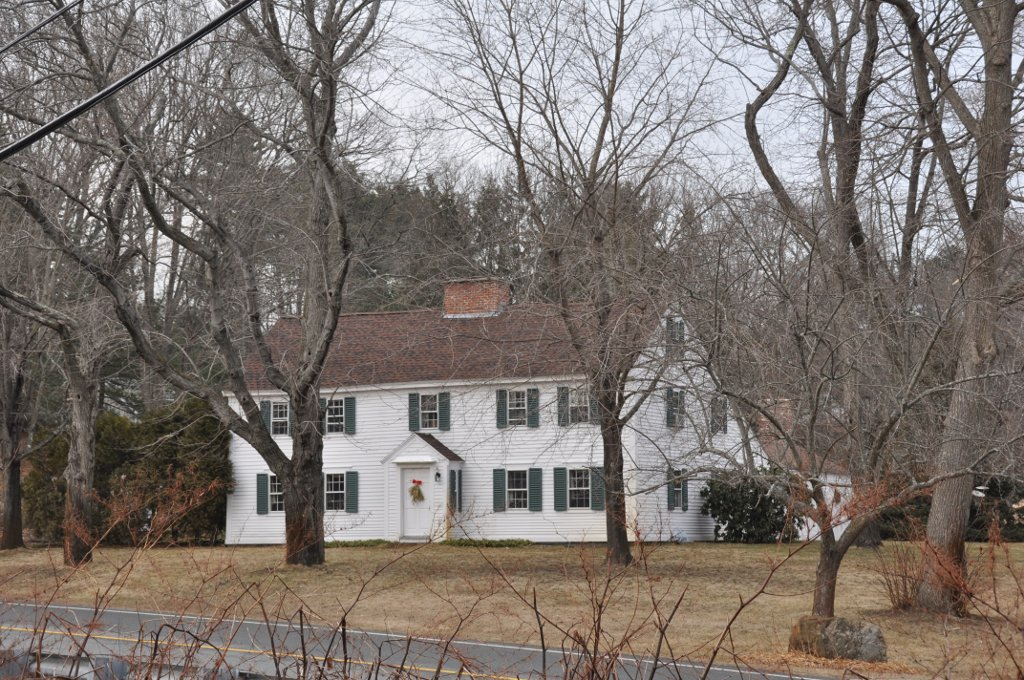

- Location within Massachusetts Location within the United States
- Location: 5 Argilla Rd., Andover, Massachusetts
- Coordinates: 42°43′37″N 71°9′25″W
- Built: 1685
- MPS: Town of Andover MRA
- NRHP reference No.: 82004811
- Added to NRHP: June 10, 1982

The Abbot-Baker House is a historic house at 5 Argilla Road in Andover, Massachusetts. Estimated to have been built about 1685, it is one of Andover's oldest houses, supposedly built by a third-generation colonist. It was listed on the National Register of Historic Places in 1982.

== Description and history ==
The Abbot-Baker House is located southwest of downtown Andover, on the north side of Argilla Road, just west of its junction with Andover Street, a major northeast–southwest artery in the town. The house is a 2 1/2-story colonial saltbox style construction with a large central chimney. It is five window bays wide, with a central entrance in a projecting gable-roofed vestibule. The door is set in a simple surround with cornice. The rear saltbox section is an integral element of its original construction. An ell has been attached to the rear of the house.

This First Period house estimated to have been built around 1685, although it is possible it contains portions of an earlier house that stood on the site. It was built for Thomas Abbot, son of one of Andover's first settlers, possibly by his brother Benjamin, whose supposed house stands on adjacent property facing Andover Street. It remained in his family until 1797, when it was sold to Symonds Baker, a doctor. The house has remained in the hands of his descendants at least into the 1980s.

== See also ==
- List of the oldest buildings in Massachusetts
- National Register of Historic Places listings in Andover, Massachusetts
- National Register of Historic Places listings in Essex County, Massachusetts
