= Richard Ward House =

Historic house in Massachusetts, United States

- U.S. National Register of Historic Places
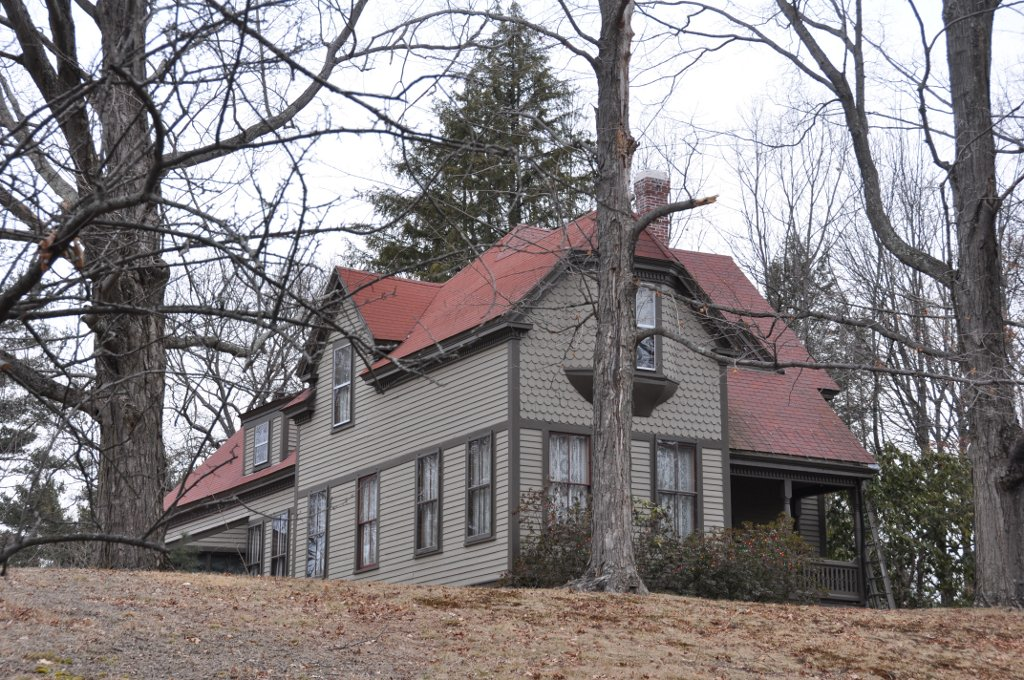

- Location within Massachusetts Location within the United States
- Location: 71 Lowell Street, Andover, Massachusetts
- Coordinates: 42°40′4″N 71°9′25″W
- Built: 1885
- Architectural style: Queen Anne
- MPS: Town of Andover MRA
- NRHP reference No.: 82004962
- Added to NRHP: June 10, 1982

The Richard Ward House is a historic house in Andover, Massachusetts. It is a 1 1/2-story wood-frame house, with asymmetrical massing characteristic of the Queen Anne style. It has a front gable with decorative cut shingles and an oriel window, and a porch with turned posts and balustrade. It is a locally distinctive example of a middle class Queen Anne style Victorian in a rural setting. It was built between 1885 and 1888 for Richard Ward, a milk dealer who had married into the locally prominent Abbot family.

The house was listed on the National Register of Historic Places in 1982.

== See also ==
- National Register of Historic Places listings in Andover, Massachusetts
- National Register of Historic Places listings in Essex County, Massachusetts
