= National Register of Historic Places listings in Andover, Massachusetts =

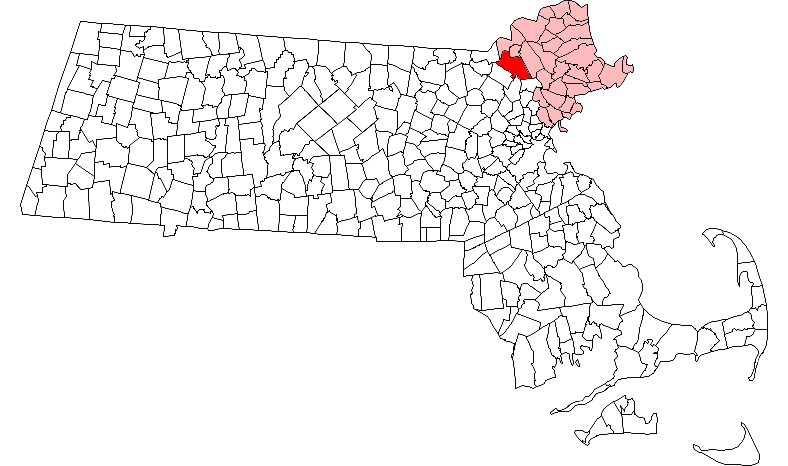
Location of Andover in Massachusetts

This is a list of the National Register of Historic Places listings in Andover, Massachusetts.

This is intended to be a complete list of the properties and districts on the National Register of Historic Places in Andover, Massachusetts, United States. The locations of National Register properties and districts for which the latitude and longitude coordinates are included below, may be seen in a Google map.

Essex County, of which Andover is a part, is the location of 461 properties and districts listed on the National Register. Andover itself is the location of 51 of these properties and districts listed on the National Register.

This National Park Service list is complete through NPS recent listings posted August 28, 2026.

== Current listings ==
	Name on the Register	Image	Date listed	Location	City or town	Description
1	Abbot Tavern	Abbot Tavern	June 10, 1982 (#82004810)	70 Elm St. 42°39′38″N 71°08′13″W	Andover	
2	Asa and Sylvester Abbot House	Asa and Sylvester Abbot House	June 10, 1982 (#82004833)	15-17 Porter Rd. 42°38′21″N 71°08′08″W	Andover	Incorrectly listed on the register at 15-17 Andover Street.
3	Benjamin Abbot House	Benjamin Abbot House	February 24, 1975 (#75000242)	9 Andover St. 42°38′47″N 71°09′11″W	Andover	
4	J. T. Abbot House	J. T. Abbot House	June 10, 1982 (#82004814)	34 Essex St. 42°39′23″N 71°08′37″W	Andover	
5	Abbot-Baker House	Abbot-Baker House	June 10, 1982 (#82004811)	5 Argilla Rd. 42°38′49″N 71°09′12″W	Andover	
6	Abbot-Battles House	Abbot-Battles House	June 10, 1982 (#82001905)	31 Lowell St. 42°40′17″N 71°09′15″W	Andover	
7	Abbot-Stinson House	Abbot-Stinson House	March 9, 1990 (#90000190)	6 Stinson Rd. 42°38′15″N 71°07′20″W	Andover	
8	Academy Hill Historic District	Academy Hill Historic District	October 7, 1982 (#82000475)	MA 28; 42°38′48″N 71°08′07″W	Andover	Encompasses Phillips Academy, Abbot Academy, Andover Theological Seminary.
9	Andover National Bank	Andover National Bank	June 10, 1982 (#82001907)	23 Main St. 42°39′20″N 71°08′26″W	Andover	
10	Andover Town Hall	Andover Town Hall	June 10, 1982 (#82004961)	20 Main St. 42°39′21″N 71°08′25″W	Andover	
11	Andover Village Industrial District	Andover Village Industrial District	October 7, 1982 (#82000476)	MA 28; 42°39′20″N 71°08′54″W	Andover	
12	Arden	Arden	June 10, 1982 (#82004812)	276 N. Main St. 42°40′05″N 71°08′57″W	Andover	
13	Timothy P. Bailey House	Timothy P. Bailey House	June 10, 1982 (#82004828)	210 Chandler Rd. 42°40′45″N 71°12′23″W	Andover	
14	Ballardvale District	Ballardvale District	October 7, 1982 (#82000477)	Off Interstate 93; 42°37′33″N 71°09′34″W	Andover	
15	Barnard Block	Barnard Block	June 10, 1982 (#82004803)	10-16 Main St. 42°39′22″N 71°08′26″W	Andover	
16	Blanchard-Upton House	Blanchard-Upton House	March 9, 1990 (#90000192)	7 Hearthstone Pl. 42°37′53″N 71°11′16″W	Andover	Listed at 62 Osgood St.
17	Bradlee School	Bradlee School	June 10, 1982 (#82004829)	147 Andover St. 42°37′50″N 71°09′45″W	Andover	
18	Central Street District	Central Street District	October 7, 1982 (#82000478)	Irregular Pattern along Central St. 42°39′06″N 71°08′41″W	Andover	
19	Chandler-Bigsby-Abbot House	Chandler-Bigsby-Abbot House	June 10, 1982 (#82004830)	88 Lowell St. 42°39′59″N 71°09′25″W	Andover	
20	Chandler-Hidden House	Chandler-Hidden House	June 10, 1982 (#82004832)	17 Hidden Rd. 42°38′28″N 71°08′01″W	Andover	
21	Chickering House	Chickering House	June 10, 1982 (#82004831)	28 Essex St. 42°39′22″N 71°08′34″W	Andover	
22	Jehiel Cochran House	Jehiel Cochran House	June 10, 1982 (#82004827)	65 Burnham Rd. 42°40′10″N 71°08′32″W	Andover	Incorrectly listed on the register at 63 Burnham Rd.
23	Dascomb House	Dascomb House	June 10, 1982 (#82004826)	125 Dascomb Rd. 42°37′39″N 71°10′34″W	Andover	
24	Flint Farm	Flint Farm	June 10, 1982 (#82004825)	85 Osgood St. 42°38′02″N 71°11′19″W	Andover	
25	Follansbee House	Follansbee House	June 10, 1982 (#82004485)	459 Lowell St. 42°38′36″N 71°12′34″W	Andover	
26	William Foster House	William Foster House	March 9, 1990 (#90000191)	96 Central St. 42°38′50″N 71°08′48″W	Andover	
27	Nathan Frye House	Nathan Frye House	June 10, 1982 (#82004824)	166 N. Main St. 42°39′42″N 71°08′42″W	Andover	
28	David Gray House	David Gray House	June 10, 1982 (#82004823)	232 Salem St. 42°37′59″N 71°06′39″W	Andover	
29	Sarah H. Harding House	Sarah H. Harding House	June 10, 1982 (#82004822)	6-8 Harding St. 42°39′47″N 71°08′39″W	Andover	
30	Harnden Farm	Harnden Farm	June 10, 1982 (#82004821)	261 Salem St. 42°37′52″N 71°06′32″W	Andover	
31	Holt Farm	Holt Farm	June 10, 1982 (#82004819)	89 Prospect Rd. 42°38′17″N 71°06′34″W	Andover	
32	Holt-Cummings-Davis House	Holt-Cummings-Davis House	June 10, 1982 (#82004820)	67 Salem St. 42°38′38″N 71°07′31″W	Andover	
33	Benjamin Jenkins House	Benjamin Jenkins House	June 10, 1982 (#82004818)	362 Salem St. 42°37′24″N 71°05′39″W	Andover	
34	The Lincolnshire	The Lincolnshire	June 10, 1982 (#82004804)	22 Hidden Rd. and 28 Hidden Way; 42°38′25″N 71°07′58″W	Andover	
35	Main Street-Locke Street Historic District	Main Street-Locke Street Historic District	October 7, 1982 (#82000479)	Main Street and Locke Street; 42°39′09″N 71°08′19″W	Andover	Listed as "Main Street-Locke".
36	Manning House	Manning House	June 10, 1982 (#82004817)	37 Porter Rd. 42°38′20″N 71°08′20″W	Andover	
37	Memorial Hall Library	Memorial Hall Library	June 10, 1982 (#82004805)	2 N. Main St. 42°39′24″N 71°08′29″W	Andover	
38	Musgrove Block	Musgrove Block	June 10, 1982 (#82004816)	2 Main St. 42°39′25″N 71°08′27″W	Andover	
39	Orlando	Orlando	June 10, 1982 (#82004815)	260 N. Main St. 42°40′02″N 71°08′59″W	Andover	Location of the private Lanam Club.
40	Osgood Farm	Osgood Farm	June 10, 1982 (#82004806)	116 Osgood St. 42°38′12″N 71°11′33″W	Andover	
41	Abiel Pearson House	Abiel Pearson House	June 10, 1982 (#82004807)	33 High St. 42°39′36″N 71°08′29″W	Andover	
42	William Perrin House	William Perrin House	June 10, 1982 (#82004799)	464 River Rd. 42°39′17″N 71°14′48″W	Andover	
43	Pillsbury-French House	Pillsbury-French House	June 10, 1982 (#82004800)	103 Dascomb Rd. 42°37′48″N 71°10′27″W	Andover	
44	Benjamin Punchard House	Benjamin Punchard House	June 10, 1982 (#82004801)	8 High St. 42°39′26″N 71°08′29″W	Andover	
45	Rogers-Downing House	Rogers-Downing House	June 10, 1982 (#82004802)	269 Highland Rd. 42°39′35″N 71°07′10″W	Andover	
46	Russell House	Russell House	June 10, 1982 (#82004808)	28 Rocky Hill Rd. 42°37′05″N 71°07′14″W	Andover	
47	Shawsheen Village Historic District	Shawsheen Village Historic District	February 9, 1979 (#79000328)	MA 133; 42°40′22″N 71°08′51″W	Andover	
48	Third Railroad Station	Third Railroad Station	June 10, 1982 (#82004809)	100 School St. 42°39′23″N 71°08′43″W	Andover	
49	Richard Ward House	Richard Ward House	June 10, 1982 (#82004962)	71 Lowell St. 42°40′04″N 71°09′25″W	Andover	
50	West Parish Center District	West Parish Center District	October 7, 1982 (#82000480)	MA 133; 42°39′26″N 71°09′56″W	Andover	
51	Woodbridge House	Woodbridge House	June 10, 1982 (#82004813)	293 Salem St. 42°37′40″N 71°06′20″W	Andover	Misspelled "Woodridge" in the National Register.

== See also ==
- List of National Historic Landmarks in Massachusetts
- National Register of Historic Places listings in Essex County, Massachusetts
