= William Foster House =

Historic house in Massachusetts, United States

- U.S. National Register of Historic Places
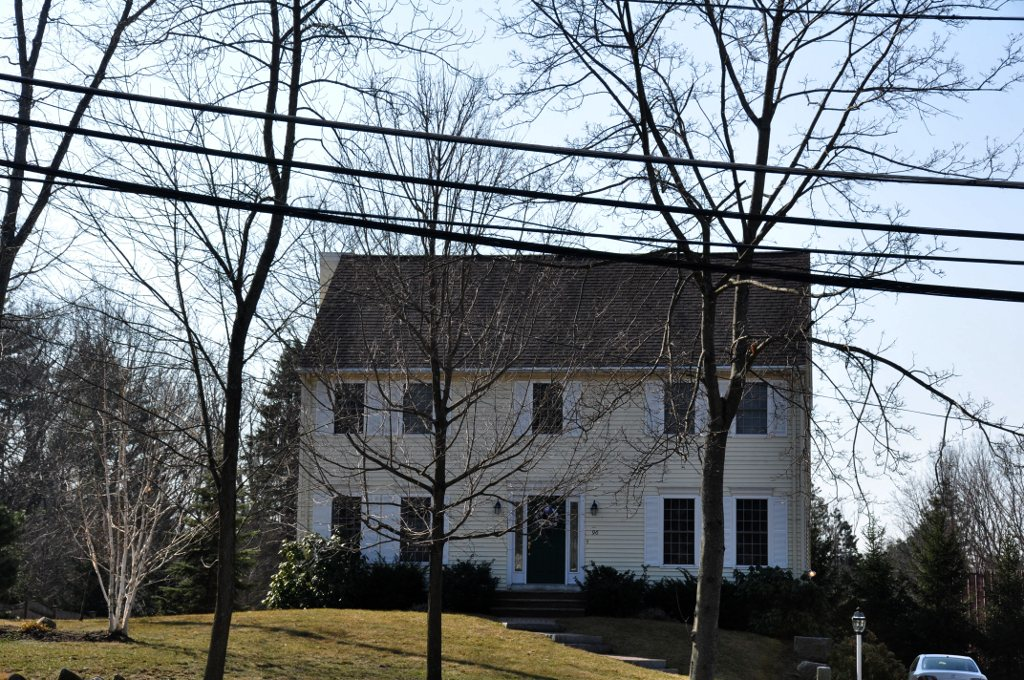

- Location within Massachusetts Location within the United States
- Location: 2 Abbot Bridge Road (formerly 96 Central Street), Andover, Massachusetts
- Coordinates: 42°38′50″N 71°8′48″W
- Built: 1720
- Architectural style: Colonial
- MPS: First Period Buildings of Eastern Massachusetts TR
- NRHP reference No.: 90000191
- Added to NRHP: March 9, 1990

The William Foster House is a historic house in Andover, Massachusetts. The core of this house is a three-bay two-story late First Period structure built c. 1720. It was added onto about 1750, adding a two-story one-room ell to the southwest corner of the house. A new chimney core was added on the north side late in the 18th century, and a second two-story wing was added on the northwest. Although the house is traditionally dated to c. 1660 (with ownership of the land traced to 1635), the stylistic construction techniques indicate a later construction date.

The house is also notable for housing a boys' school in the later years of the 18th century, operated by William Foster for students who could not qualify for Phillips Academy. It was listed on the National Register of Historic Places in 1990.

== See also ==
- National Register of Historic Places listings in Andover, Massachusetts
- National Register of Historic Places listings in Essex County, Massachusetts
