= Abbot Tavern =

- U.S. National Register of Historic Places
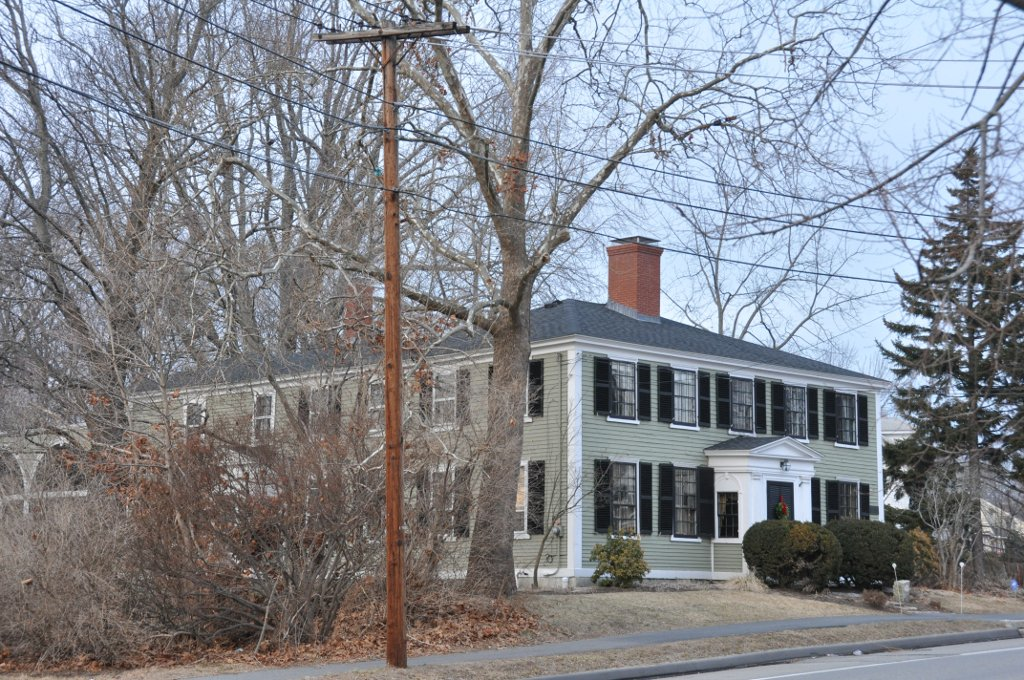

- Location within Massachusetts Location within the United States
- Location: 70 Elm St., Andover, Massachusetts
- Coordinates: 42°39′37.18″N 71°8′13.17″W
- Architectural style: Georgian
- MPS: Town of Andover MRA
- NRHP reference No.: 82004810
- Added to NRHP: June 10, 1982

Abbot Tavern is a historic former tavern, now a private residence, in Andover, Massachusetts. Probably built in the second half of the 18th century, it is a prominent local example of Georgian, and is also significant for its association with the locally prominent Abbot family. The tavern was listed on the National Register of Historic Places in 1982.

== Description and history ==
The former Abbot Tavern is located northeast of downtown Andover, on the northwest side of Elm Street a short way north of its junction with Wolcott Street. The street is a busy through street in a residential area. The tavern is a two-story wood frame structure, with a low-pitch hip roof, central chimney, and clapboarded exterior. It is five bays wide and three deep, with a center entrance sheltered by a projecting gabled vestibule. The vestibule entry is framed by pilasters, which rise to an entablature that extends around the projecting sides, and is topped by a gabled pediment. Windows are 8-over-6 sash on the first floor and 6-over-6 on the second; the latter are set close to the eave in the Federal style. A two-story hip-roof ell projects to the rear, its southern facade a continuation of the main block.

The tavern's construction date is uncertain: it has traditionally been claimed to have been built about 1680, but the structure clearly has Georgian styling, and only first appears in town records in 1776, when Isaac Abbot petitioned to operate a tavern. The building is also notable for hosting George Washington when he visited the area in 1789. The tavern served as the town's first post office, and Isaac Abbot as its first postmaster. Abbot was prominent in local civic affairs, serving as a selectman and town clerk.

== See also ==
- National Register of Historic Places listings in Andover, Massachusetts
- National Register of Historic Places listings in Essex County, Massachusetts
