= Abbot-Battles House =

Historic house in Massachusetts, United States

- U.S. National Register of Historic Places
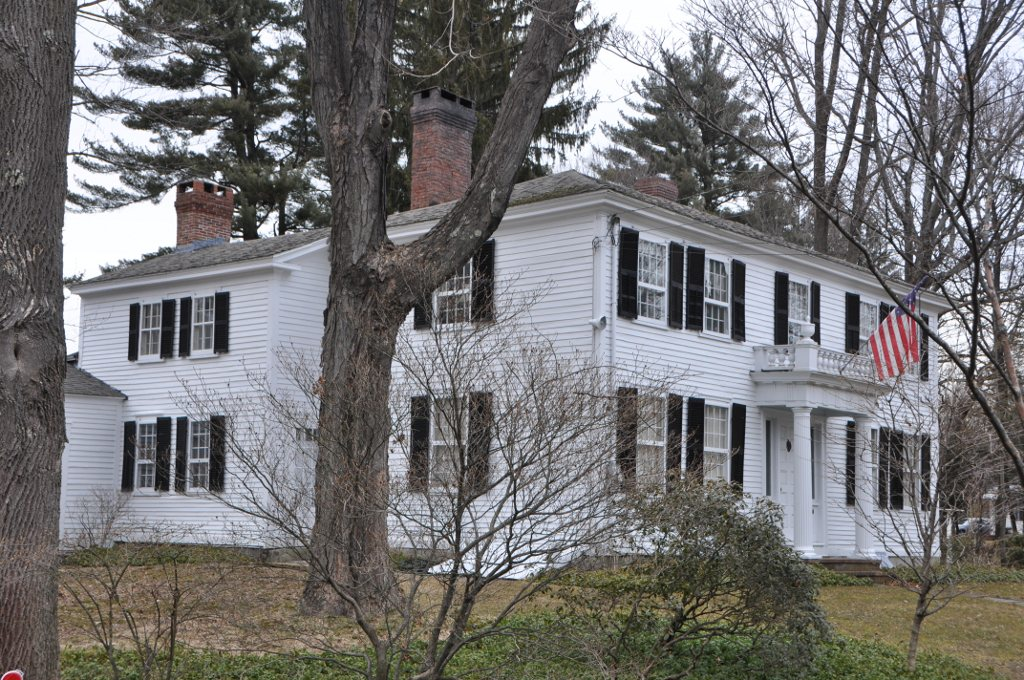

- Location within Massachusetts Location within the United States
- Location: 31 Lowell St., Andover, Massachusetts
- Coordinates: 42°40′17″N 71°9′15″W
- Built: 1809
- Architectural style: Federal
- MPS: Town of Andover MRA
- NRHP reference No.: 82001905
- Added to NRHP: June 10, 1982

The Abbot-Battles House is a historic house in Andover, Massachusetts. Built about 1809 as a farmhouse for a member of the locally prominent Abbot family, it is a good example of Federal period architecture, with later Victorian additions. It was listed on the National Register of Historic Places in 1982.

== Description and history ==
The Abbot-Battles House is located north of downtown Andover, on the north side of Lowell Street (Massachusetts Route 133), a busy east–west through street. It is a two-story wood-frame structure, with a low-pitch hip roof and clapboarded exterior. Its main facade is five bays wide, with a center entrance sheltered by a Victorian-era porch. Ionic columns rise to an entablature adorned with triglyphs, and the porch roof is bounded by a balustrade with urns on the posts.

The house was built about 1809 for Jeduthan Abbot, a farmer who had married in 1805 and by then had two children. The house was built in part around the core of an older house, built c. 1700, which the previous owner of the property had removed part of. The Federalist facade of the house dates to Abbot's ownership. In 1838 Abbot sold the property to his son, from whom it quickly passed to Winslow Battles, who is identified by trade as a machinist. The house remained in the Battles family until 1950. The house's ownership history is indicative of the town's transition from an agrarian to an industrial economy.

== See also ==
- National Register of Historic Places listings in Andover, Massachusetts
- National Register of Historic Places listings in Essex County, Massachusetts
