= Abbot-Stinson House =

Historic house in Massachusetts, United States

- U.S. National Register of Historic Places
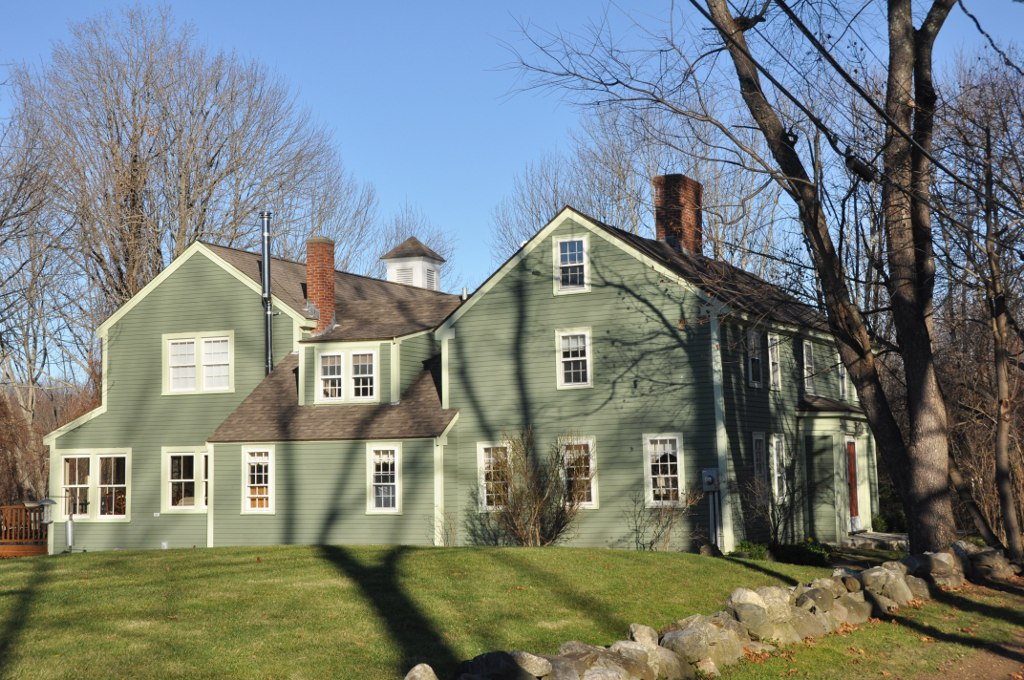

- Location within Massachusetts Location within the United States
- Location: 6 Stinson Road, Andover, Massachusetts
- Coordinates: 42°38′15″N 71°7′20″W
- Area: less than one acre
- Architectural style: Colonial
- MPS: First Period Buildings of Eastern Massachusetts TR
- NRHP reference No.: 90000190
- Added to NRHP: March 9, 1990

The Abbot-Stinson House is a historic house in Andover, Massachusetts. The house is estimated to have been built in the early 1720s, in the transitional period between First Period and Georgian styles of construction. It was originally one room deep with a central chimney, but was extended by additions to the rear in the 20th century. The house was listed on the National Register of Historic Places in 1990.

== Description ==
The Abbot-Stinson House is set at the northern corner of the junction of Stinson and Holt Roads in a rural section of eastern Andover. The main block of the house is a 2 1/2-story wood-frame structure, with a side-gable roof, wooden clapboard siding, and a large central chimney. The house which faces Stinson Road, has a five-bay main facade, with the outer bays more closely spaced than that in the center. The entrance has a projecting vestibule with Federal styling. A series of 20th-century additions enlarge the original structure to the rear, and there is a detached modern garage to the right.

The house is estimated to have been built c. 1720-26 for a member of the locally-prominent Abbot family. In its original form it consisted of one room on each side of the central chimney, with a narrow winding staircase between the entrance vestibule and the chimney. This staircase has retained one of its original newel posts; the railings are modern replacements. Architectural evidence of its early construction date include quirk-beaded main beams and gunstock-shaped posts at the corners on the second floor. The chamber on the west side was likely the kitchen, with a large fireplace that has since been closed off. This space was later subdivided to form a closet, bathroom, and hallway leading to the modern addition to the rear. Both the parlor (to the east of the chimney) and the parlor chamber above it feature high-quality wood paneling, and the framing members (exposed in the kitchen chamber) are boxed.

The house, representing a well-preserved example of an early transitional First Period-Georgian house, was listed on the National Register of Historic Places in 1990.

== See also ==
- National Register of Historic Places listings in Andover, Massachusetts
- National Register of Historic Places listings in Essex County, Massachusetts
