= Andover Village Industrial District =

Historic district in Massachusetts, United States

- U.S. National Register of Historic Places
- U.S. Historic district
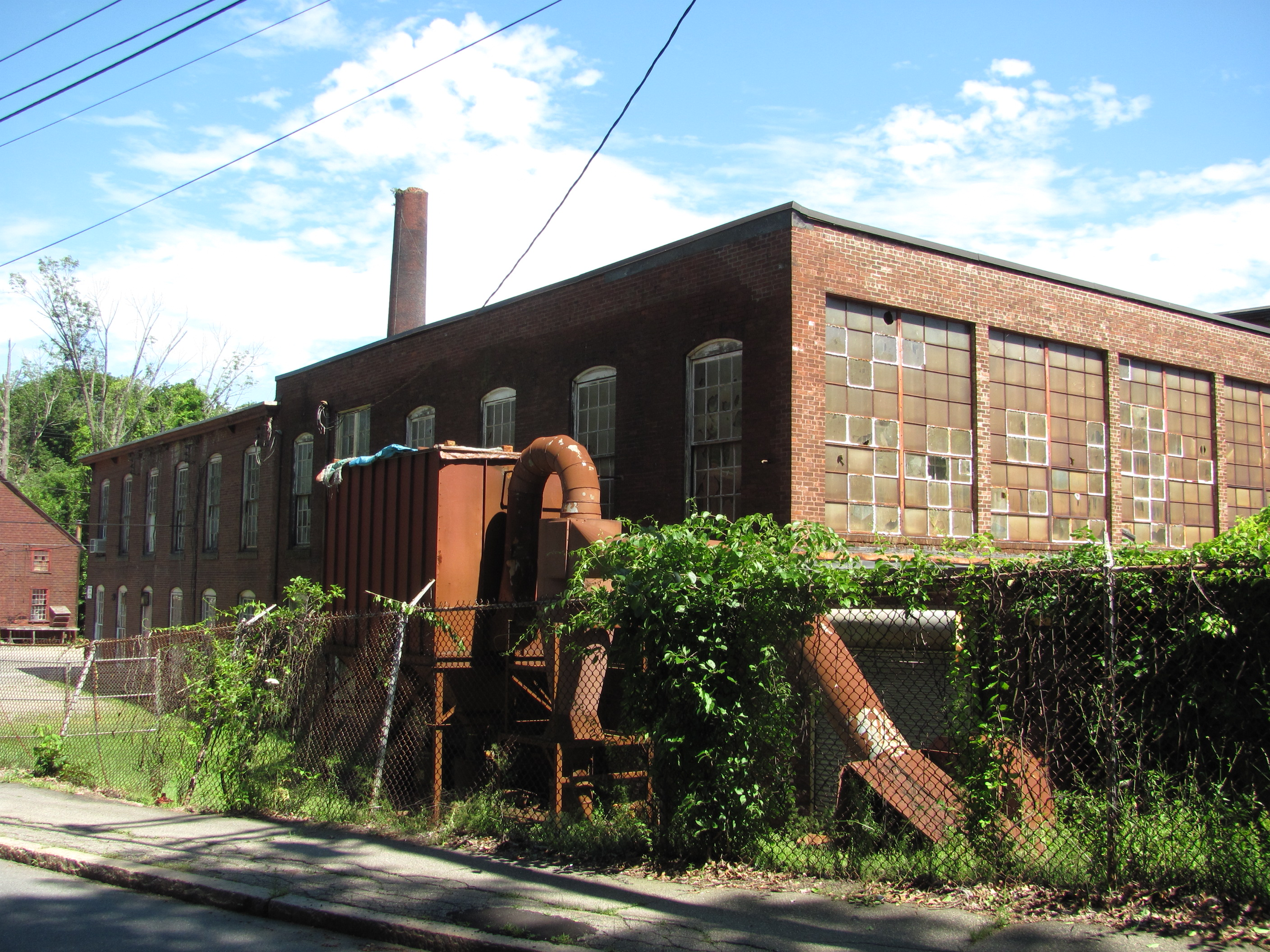
- Building on Red Spring Road

- Location within Massachusetts Location within the United States
- Location: Andover, Massachusetts
- Coordinates: 42°39′20″N 71°8′54″W
- Built: 1814
- Architectural style: Greek Revival
- MPS: Town of Andover MRA
- NRHP reference No.: 82000476
- Added to NRHP: October 7, 1982

The Andover Village Industrial District encompasses one of the 19th century industrial mill villages of Andover, Massachusetts known locally as "The Village". The growth of this village contributed to the decision in the 19th century to separate the more rural area of North Andover from the town. It is centered on a stretch of the Shawsheen River between North Main Street on the east and Moraine Street on the west. Most of the district's properties lie on Stevens Street, Red Spring Road, Shawsheen Road, and Essex Street, with a few properties also located on adjacent roads.

Although no buildings remain from Andover's earliest industrial enterprises in the area, there are still some mill buildings that date as far back as to the 1820s in the old Marland Mill complex on Stevens Street. The most prominent building in this complex, however, is a spinning and carding mill that was built in 1885, and features a five-story tower and ornate brick detailing.

One of the older buildings in the district was the Abbot Mills complex, with history dating to 1814. Located at 18-20 Red Spring Road, it was a 3 1/2-story wood-frame barn-like structure. It was next door to the mills of Smith & Dove, which are of stone construction dating to the 1820s. The other major industrial component of the district is the Tyer Rubber complex on Railroad Street, whose main building dates to 1912. The barn-like structure of the Abbot Mills complex suffered a fire in 2013 and was demolished in 2014. Much of the wood in the building was salvaged and recycled.

There is a significant variety in the types of housing related to the mills. Much of the early housing has Greek Revival styling, although there are a few houses that show more Federal style detailing. Later housing includes boarding houses, tenements, and other multiunit buildings in a diversity of styles.

The district was listed on the National Register of Historic Places in 1982.

== See also ==
- National Register of Historic Places listings in Andover, Massachusetts
- National Register of Historic Places listings in Essex County, Massachusetts
