= Chandler-Hidden House =

Historic house in Massachusetts, United States

- U.S. National Register of Historic Places
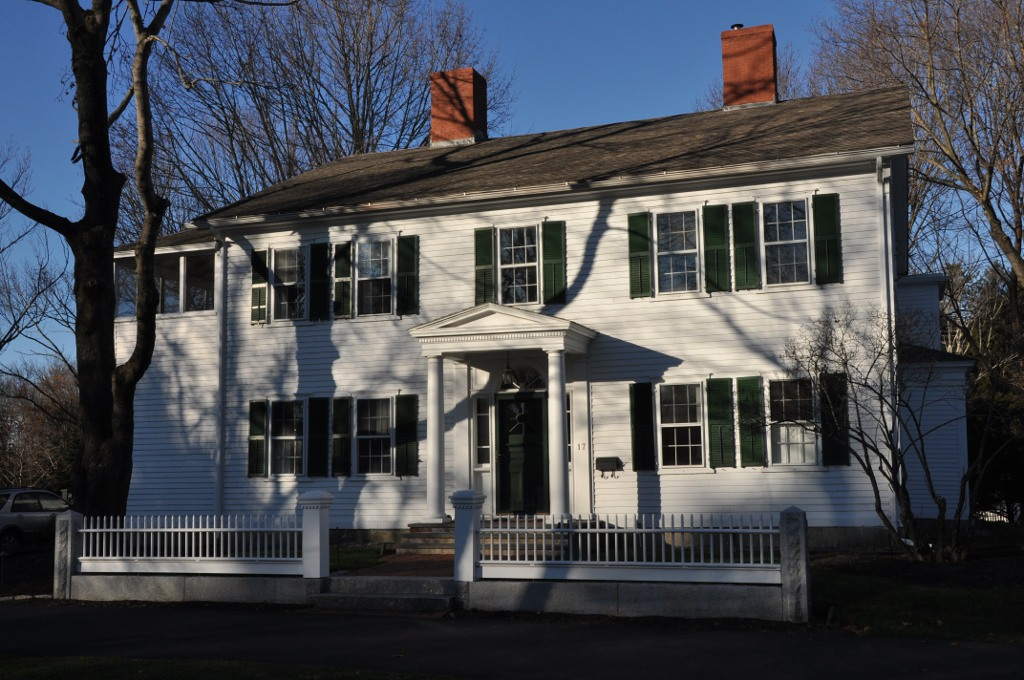

- Location within Massachusetts Location within the United States
- Location: 17 Hidden Road, Andover, Massachusetts
- Coordinates: 42°38′28″N 71°8′1″W
- Built: 1812
- Architectural style: Federal
- MPS: Town of Andover MRA
- NRHP reference No.: 82004832
- Added to NRHP: June 10, 1982

The Chandler-Hidden House is a historic house in Andover, Massachusetts. It was built for Isaac Chandler, probably by his son-in-law David Hidden, in about 1812. Hidden, a housewright, had come to Andover to help in the construction of the Andover Theological Seminary. He married Chandler's daughter in 1816, bought half the house in 1828, and the rest after Chandler's death in 1834. The house passed out of the Hidden family in 1897. It is a 2 1/2-story Federal style colonial, with five window bays and two side chimneys. The centered front door is protected by a protruding portico, and there is a rear ell that appears to be original to the house.

The house was listed on the National Register of Historic Places in 1982.

== See also ==
- National Register of Historic Places listings in Andover, Massachusetts
- National Register of Historic Places listings in Essex County, Massachusetts
