= William Perrin House =

Historic house in Massachusetts, United States

- U.S. National Register of Historic Places
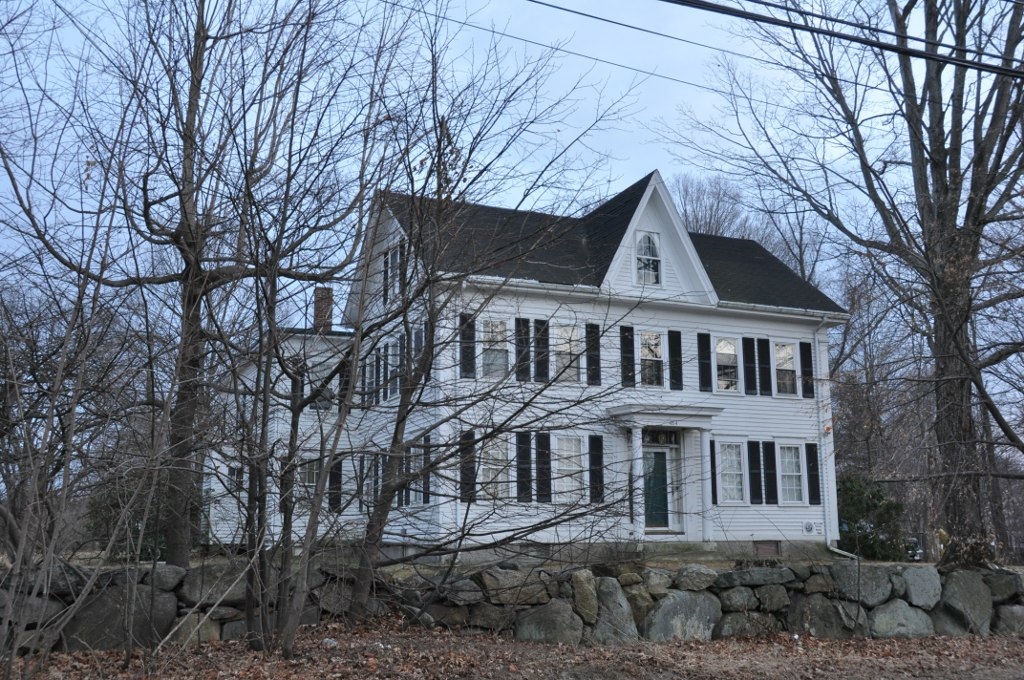

- Location within Massachusetts Location within the United States
- Location: 464 River Road, Andover, Massachusetts
- Coordinates: 42°39′17″N 71°14′48″W
- Built: 1850
- Architectural style: Greek Revival, Gothic Revival
- MPS: Town of Andover MRA
- NRHP reference No.: 82004799
- Added to NRHP: June 10, 1982

The William Perrin House is a historic house in western Andover, Massachusetts. It was built between 1850 and 1852 by William Perrin on land owned by his wife's family. The house features Greek Revival and Gothic Revival details, including corner pilasters, an entablature below the roofline, and a dramatic entry portico with attenuated columns, sidelight windows, and a transom window. The sophistication of the styling is relatively uncommon for what was at the time of its construction a rural agricultural setting. The house was added to the National Register of Historic Places in 1982.

== See also ==
- National Register of Historic Places listings in Andover, Massachusetts
- National Register of Historic Places listings in Essex County, Massachusetts
