= Sarah H. Harding House =

Historic house in Massachusetts, United States

- U.S. National Register of Historic Places
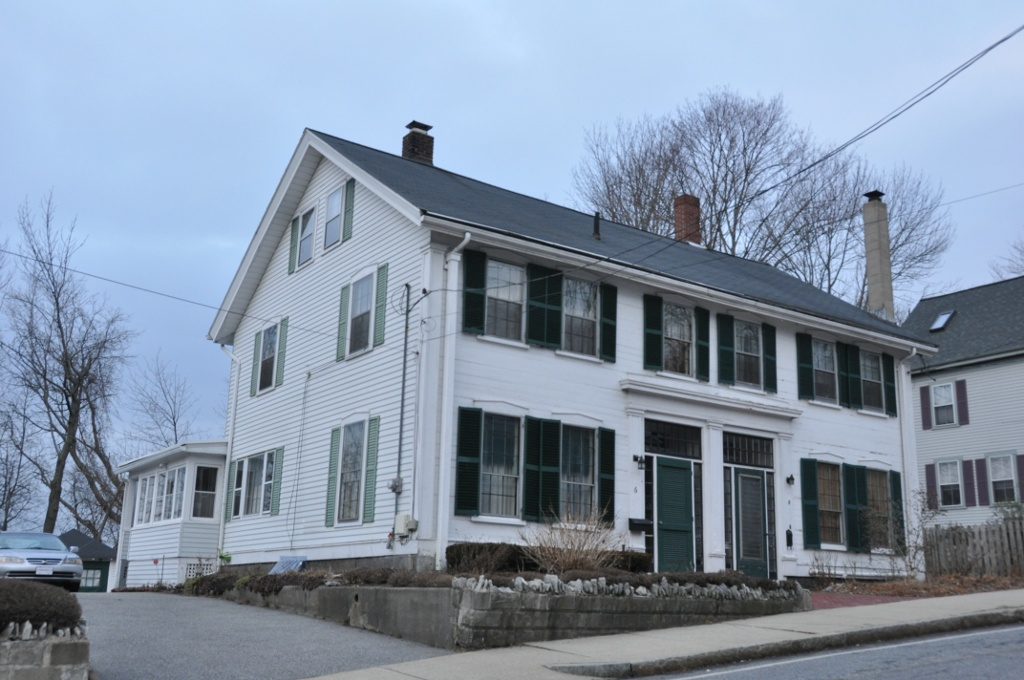

- Location within Massachusetts Location within the United States
- Location: 6–8 Harding Street, Andover, Massachusetts
- Coordinates: 42°40′0″N 70°55′30″W
- Built: 1846
- Architectural style: Greek Revival
- MPS: Town of Andover MRA
- NRHP reference No.: 82004822
- Added to NRHP: June 10, 1982

The Sarah H. Harding House is a historic duplex house in Andover, Massachusetts. It was built in 1846 for Sarah Harding, a single woman who belonged to the locally notable Harding family (for whom Harding Street is named). She had the Greek Revival duplex built to provide housing for single women of modest means at a time when such housing was relatively uncommon. The building is 2.5 stories tall, with entry to both units through matching doors in the center of the six-bay facade. The entranceway features a classical surround, with glass side lights and transom.

The house was added to the National Register of Historic Places in 1982.

== See also ==
- National Register of Historic Places listings in Andover, Massachusetts
- National Register of Historic Places listings in Essex County, Massachusetts
