= Main Street–Locke Street Historic District =

Historic district in Massachusetts, United States

- U.S. National Register of Historic Places
- U.S. Historic district
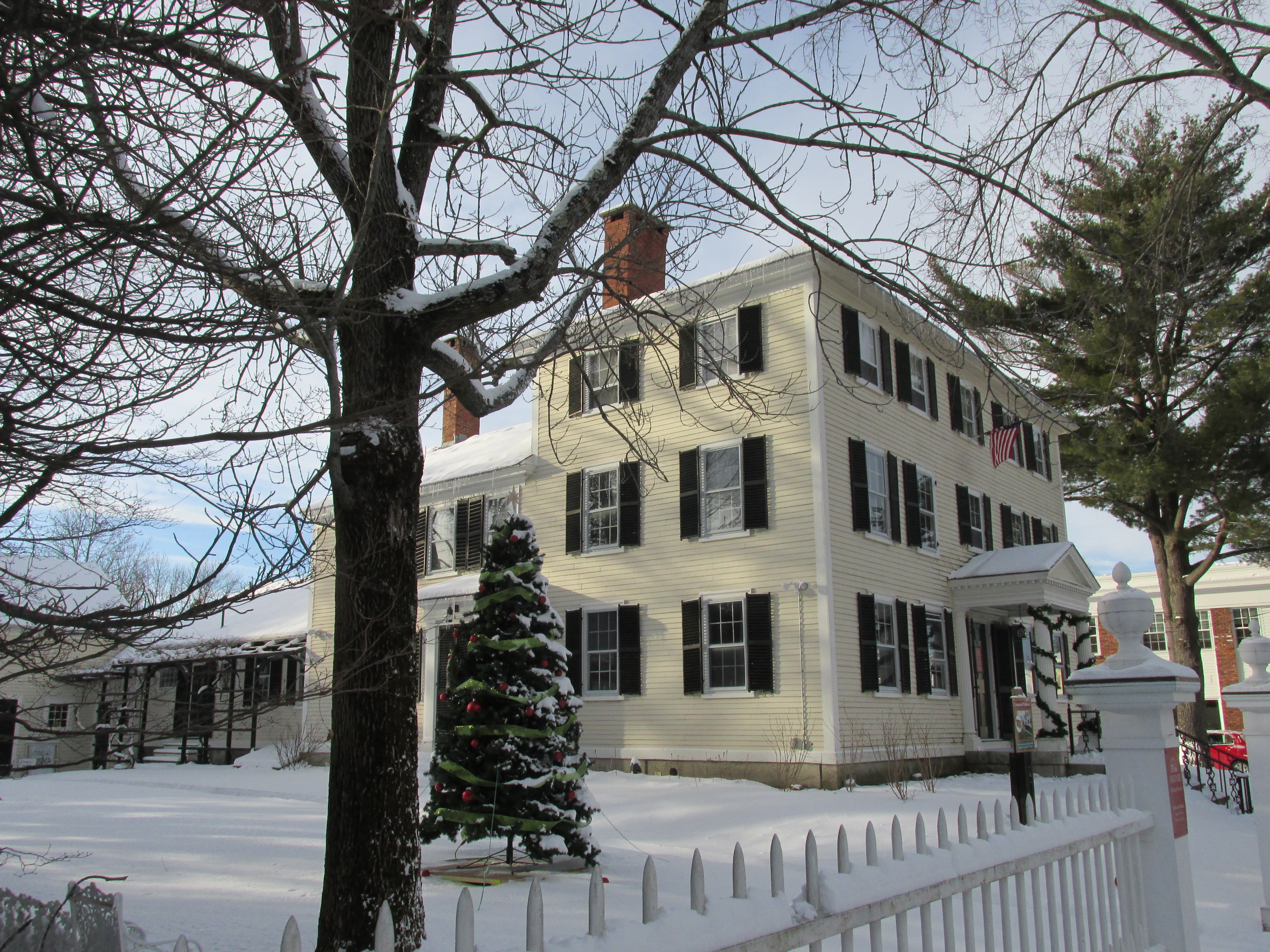
- Andover Historical Society

- Location within Massachusetts Location within the United States
- Location: Andover, Massachusetts
- Coordinates: 42°39′9″N 71°8′19″W
- Architectural style: Mid 19th Century Revival, Federal
- MPS: Town of Andover MRA
- NRHP reference No.: 82000479
- Added to NRHP: October 7, 1982

The Main Street–Locke Street Historic District is a residential historic district in Andover, Massachusetts. It is located along Main Street north of Academy Hill, between Morton Street and Punchard Avenue. It also includes several houses on Locke Street, Punchard, and Chapman Avenue.

The oldest buildings in the district date to 1819, at a period when the area only saw modest growth due to the nearby academic institutions. The conversion of one of these houses into Locke's Tavern in 1825 brought some additional growth along Main Street, resulting in the construction of several Greek Revival houses. The most significant growth in the area came in the second half of the 19th century, when a number of Queen Anne, Shingle style, and Colonial Revival houses were built. Most of these buildings were large, and are now either multifamily residences of housing for the schools. Two of the buildings on Locke Street were built for fraternal organizations, one of which, the November Club at 6 Locke Street, is believed to be the oldest women's club building in New England.

Despite the variety of architectural styles represented, the district has some uniformity in the proportion and setback of the houses, especially on Main Street. The district was listed on the National Register of Historic Places in 1982.

== See also ==
- National Register of Historic Places listings in Andover, Massachusetts
- National Register of Historic Places listings in Essex County, Massachusetts
