= Benjamin Jenkins House =

Historic house in Massachusetts, United States

- U.S. National Register of Historic Places
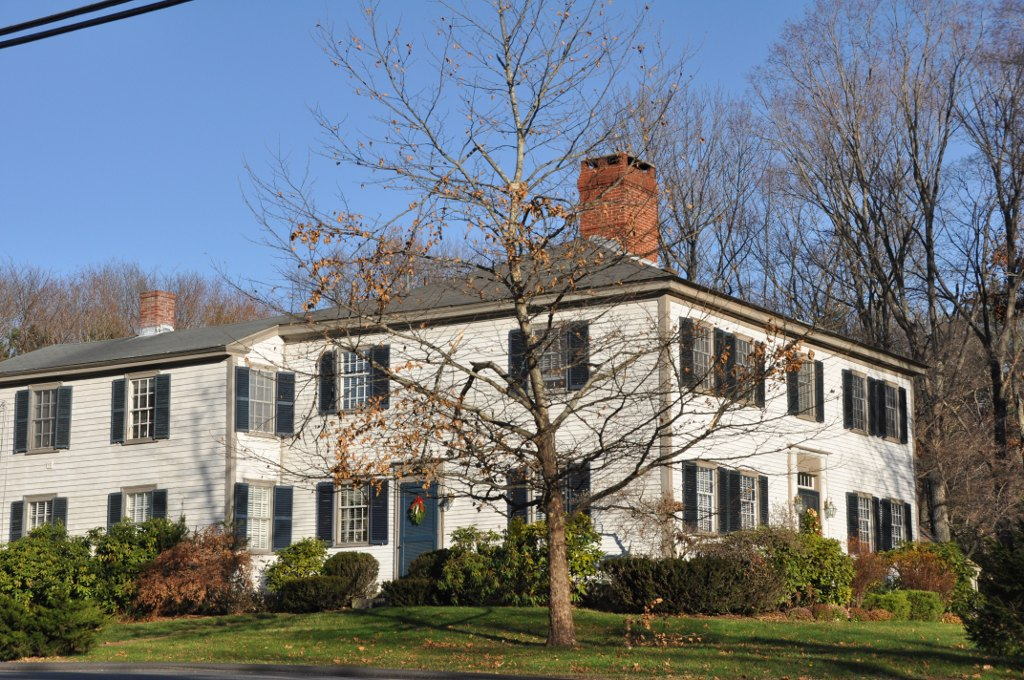

- Location within Massachusetts Location within the United States
- Location: 362 Salem Street, Andover, Massachusetts
- Coordinates: 42°37′24″N 71°5′39″W
- Built: 1807
- Architectural style: Federal
- MPS: Town of Andover MRA
- NRHP reference No.: 82004818
- Added to NRHP: June 10, 1982

The Benjamin Jenkins House is a historic house in Andover, Massachusetts. It was built in about 1807 for Colonel Benjamin Jenkins on family-owned land. The substantial and elegant Federal style house was a stop on the road between Salem and Andover, and remained in the family into the 20th century. One of its owners, William S. Jenkins, was a local builder of note in the second half of the 19th century, built the large ell of the house in 1849. In 1982, the house was added to the National Register of Historic Places.

== See also ==
- National Register of Historic Places listings in Andover, Massachusetts
- National Register of Historic Places listings in Essex County, Massachusetts
