= Follansbee House =

Historic house in Massachusetts, United States

- U.S. National Register of Historic Places
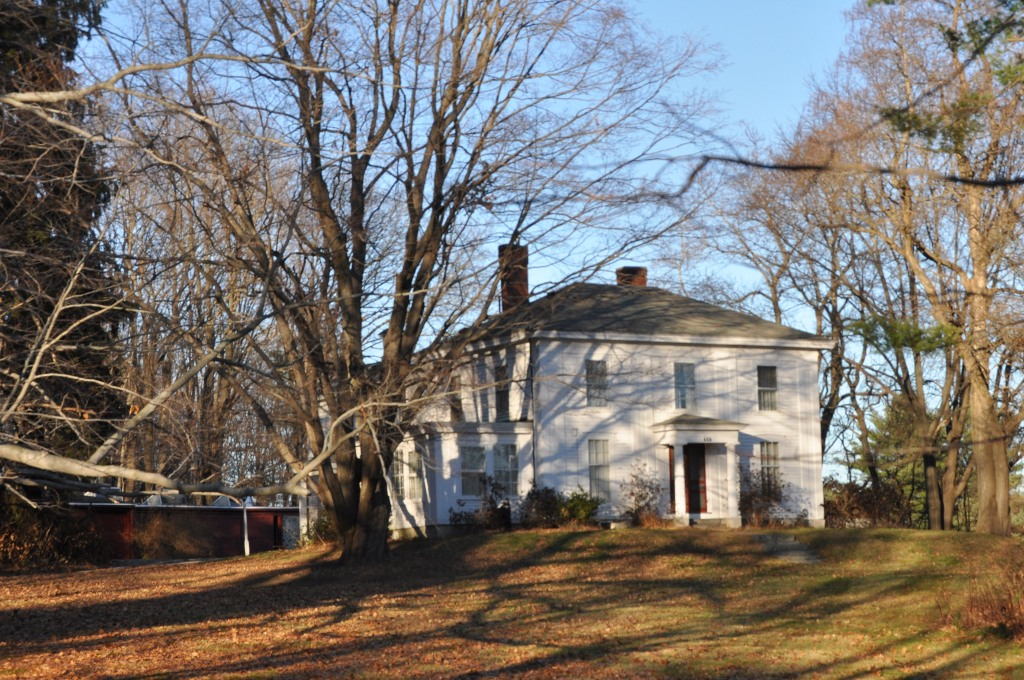

- Location within Massachusetts Location within the United States
- Location: 459 Lowell Street, Andover, Massachusetts
- Coordinates: 42°38′36″N 71°12′34″W
- Built: 1835
- Architectural style: Greek Revival
- MPS: Town of Andover MRA
- NRHP reference No.: 82004485
- Added to NRHP: June 10, 1982

The Follansbee House is a historic house in Andover, Massachusetts. It was probably built c. 1835 by Paul Bailey Follansbee, previously of West Newbury, and is a locally distinctive example of an elaborate Greek Revival house. The house was listed on the National Register of Historic Places in 1982.

== Description and history ==
The Follansbee House is set on the north side of Lowell Street (Massachusetts Route 133), located further back from the road than neighboring houses. It is a rectangular wood-frame structure, 2 1/2 stories high, with a hip roof pierced by two chimneys set toward the rear. The corners have paneled pilasters, and an entablature runs below the roof line. The front facade is three bays wide, with the bays demarcated by similar pilasters. The entrance is in the center bay, sheltered by a portico supported by Ionic columns.

The house was probably built by West Newbury native Paul Bailey Follansbee, who purchased the property in 1834. There is no record of whether this transaction included a house; it may have also been built earlier by John Crosby, the seller. Follansbee was a nursery farmer and florist, as well as an amateur archaeologist, collecting prehistoric Native artifacts he found on his property. The property was investigated by a professional archaeologist in 1951.

== See also ==
- National Register of Historic Places listings in Andover, Massachusetts
- National Register of Historic Places listings in Essex County, Massachusetts
