= Timothy P. Bailey House =

Historic house in Massachusetts, United States

- U.S. National Register of Historic Places
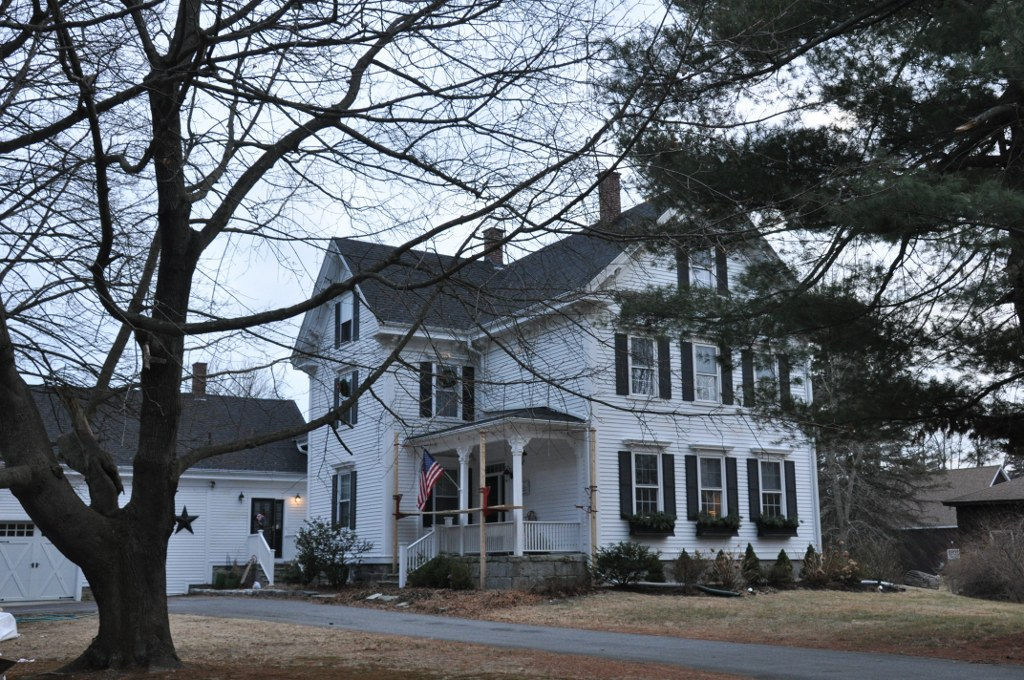

- Location within Massachusetts Location within the United States
- Location: 210 Chandler Road, Andover, Massachusetts
- Coordinates: 42°40′45″N 71°12′23″W
- Built: 1878
- Architectural style: Italianate
- MPS: Town of Andover MRA
- NRHP reference No.: 82004828
- Added to NRHP: June 10, 1982

The Timothy P. Bailey House is a historic house in Andover, Massachusetts. It was built by Timothy Palmer Bailey, on land purchased from his father's estate. The Baileys were successful farmers, and the younger one, who was educated at Phillips Academy, built this locally rare example of an Italianate house in 1878. The 2 1/2-story L-shaped house features bracketed cornices, and a main entrance porch that is elaborately balustraded and also bracketed.

The house was listed on the National Register of Historic Places in 1982.

== See also ==
- National Register of Historic Places listings in Andover, Massachusetts
- National Register of Historic Places listings in Essex County, Massachusetts
