= Flint Farm =

- U.S. National Register of Historic Places
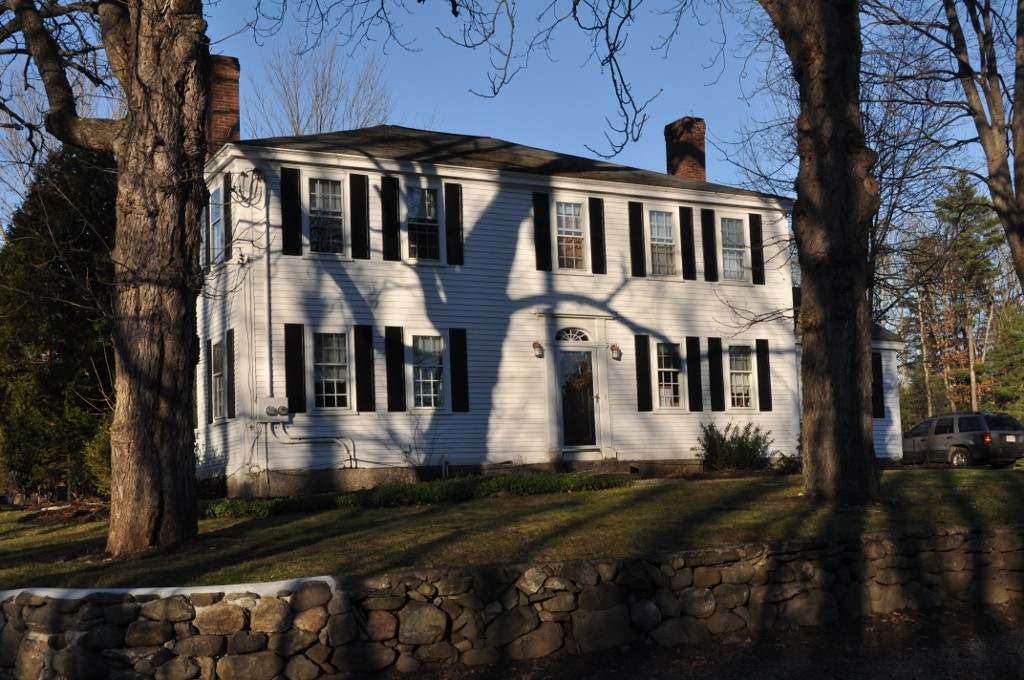

- Location within Massachusetts Location within the United States
- Location: 85 Osgood Street, Andover, Massachusetts
- Coordinates: 42°38′2″N 71°11′19″W
- Built: 1810
- Architectural style: Federal
- MPS: Town of Andover MRA
- NRHP reference No.: 82004825
- Added to NRHP: June 10, 1982

The Flint Farm is a historic farmhouse in Andover, Massachusetts. It was built in 1810 for farmer John Flint, and remained in the family until it was sold by his grandchildren in 1894. It is a two-story wood-frame structure with a hip roof and two side chimneys. Its main facade is five bays wide, with asymmetrically placed windows. The center entrance is flanked by pilasters and topped by a fanlight window and a cornice. The house is a comparatively ambitious and sophisticated Federal style house for a rural area.

The house was listed on the National Register of Historic Places in 1982.

== See also ==
- National Register of Historic Places listings in Andover, Massachusetts
- National Register of Historic Places listings in Essex County, Massachusetts
