= Harnden Farm =

- U.S. National Register of Historic Places
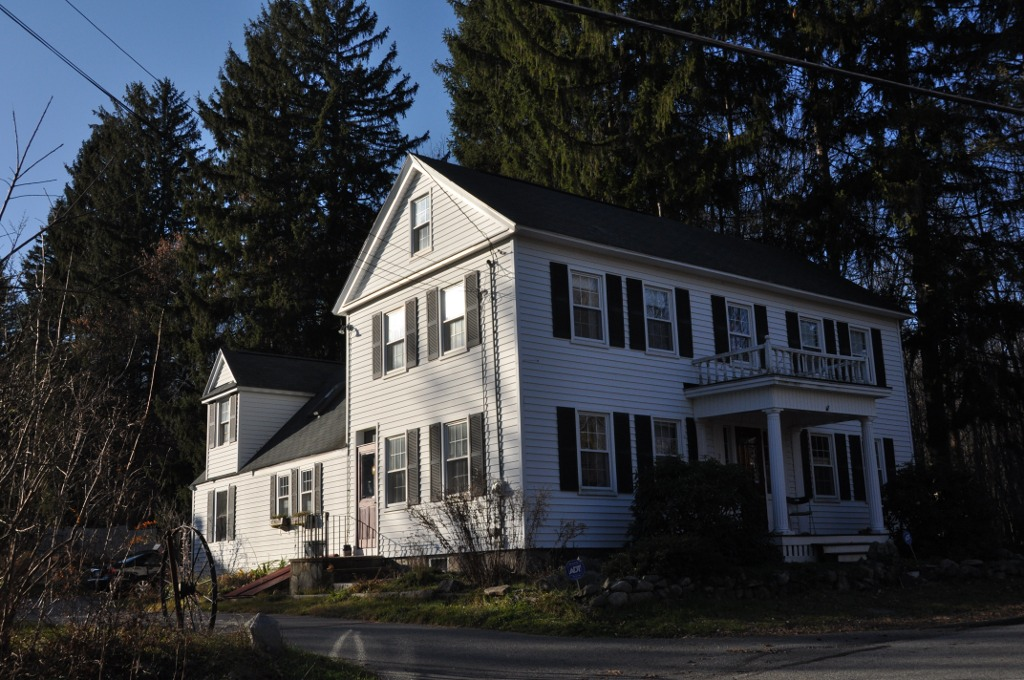

- Location within Massachusetts Location within the United States
- Location: 261 Salem Street, Andover, Massachusetts
- Coordinates: 42°37′52″N 71°6′32″W
- Built: 1840
- Architectural style: Greek Revival
- MPS: Town of Andover MRA
- NRHP reference No.: 82004821
- Added to NRHP: June 10, 1982

Harnden Farm, known today as Infinity Farm, is a historic farmstead in Andover, Massachusetts. It includes a farmhouse and barn, built c. 1840 for Jesse Harnden, a farmer who moved from Reading. The house is notable for its late Federal style elements as well as its Greek Revival styling. It is 2 1/2 stories high, five bays wide, with a side gable roof and end chimneys. Its main entrance is sheltered by a portico with fluted columns and a balustrade on its roof. The barn on the property is a rare surviving example of a Greek Revival barn.

The farmstead was listed on the National Register of Historic Places in 1982.

== See also ==
- National Register of Historic Places listings in Andover, Massachusetts
- National Register of Historic Places listings in Essex County, Massachusetts
