= Andover Town Hall =

- U.S. National Register of Historic Places
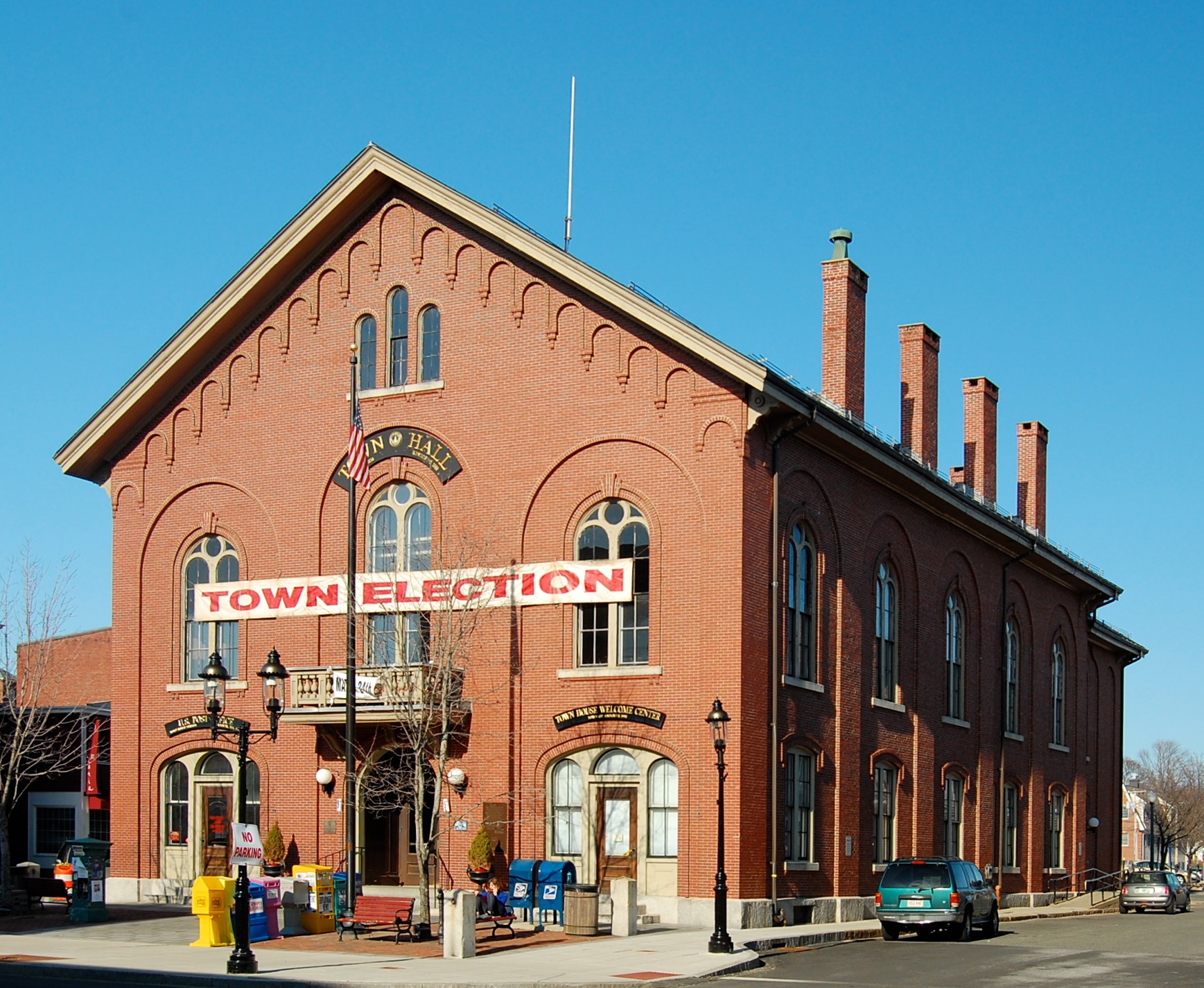

- Location within Massachusetts Location within the United States
- Location: Andover, Massachusetts
- Coordinates: 42°39′21″N 71°8′25″W
- Built: 1858
- Architect: Voelkers, Theodore; Abbott & Clement
- Architectural style: Romanesque
- MPS: Town of Andover MRA
- NRHP reference No.: 82004961
- Added to NRHP: June 10, 1982

Andover Town Hall is the historic town hall of Andover, Massachusetts. It is located at 20 Main Street, between Park and Barnard Streets. The 2 1/2 story Romanesque Revival red brick building was constructed in 1858, not long after the separation of North Andover. It was designed by Boston architect Theodore Voelkers and built by local builders Abbott & Clement. The building design echoed that of the mills that dotted the town. It was listed on the National Register of Historic Places in 1982.

== Description and history ==
Andover Town Hall is located near the central intersection of Andover's main business district, on the east side of Main Street (Massachusetts Route 28) between Park and Barnard Streets. It is a 2 1/2-story brick structure, with a front-facing gable roof and Romanesque Revival styling. Its main facade (facing west) is divided into three bays, each set in a panel with a round-arch top. The entrance is in the center bay, recessed within a round-arch opening and sheltered by a canopy with balcony. Above is a tripartite round-arch window, a style replicated on the second-level windows on the front and sides. On the ground floor the entrance is flanked by wider arches which contain three-part storefronts with doors flanked by windows. The interior of the building houses town offices; its upper levels original housed a large ballroom, which was divided horizontally and vertically to provide additional office space in the 1920s.

The town hall was built in response to the separation of North Andover in 1855, resulting in the loss of Andover's original town center. Following the separation, early town meetings were held in a local furniture store. Construction of this building was proposed in 1856, and the building was completed two years later. Its design, by Theodore Voelkers, an architect known for his mill designs, echoes those structures that were the source of the area's prosperity.

== See also ==
- National Register of Historic Places listings in Andover, Massachusetts
- National Register of Historic Places listings in Essex County, Massachusetts
