= Manning House (Andover, Massachusetts) =

Historic house in Massachusetts, United States

- U.S. National Register of Historic Places
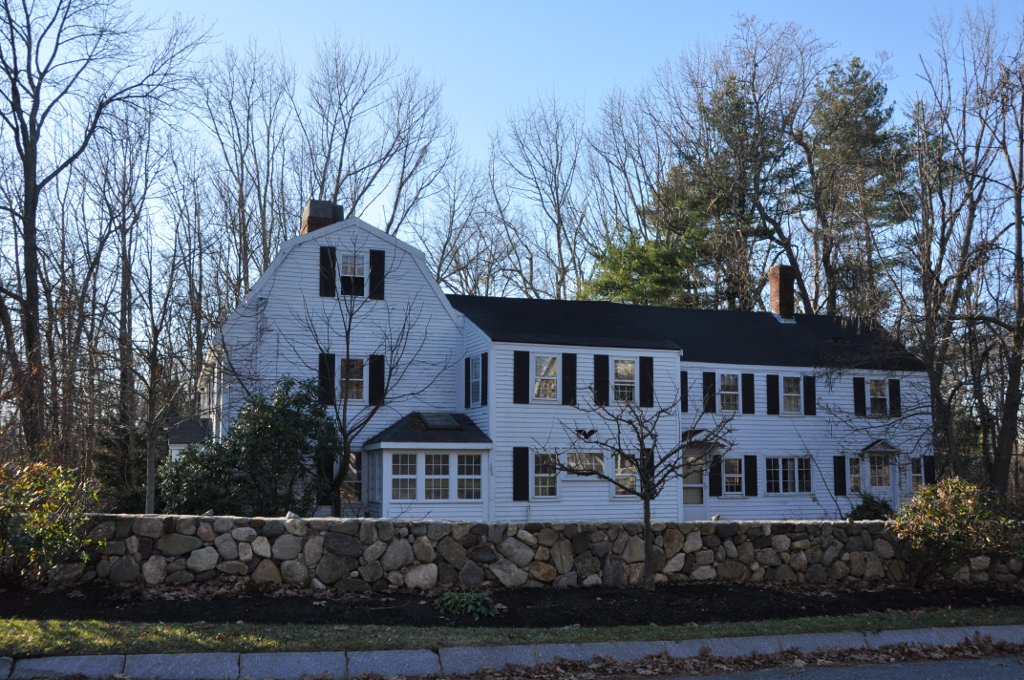

- Location within Massachusetts Location within the United States
- Location: 37 Porter Road, Andover, Massachusetts
- Coordinates: 42°38′20″N 71°8′20″W
- Built: 1760
- Architectural style: Georgian
- MPS: Town of Andover MRA
- NRHP reference No.: 82004817
- Added to NRHP: June 10, 1982

The Manning House is a historic house in Andover, Massachusetts. It was built c. 1760 for Hezekiah Ballard, a local farmer. Ballard sold the property to Thomas Manning, a cordwainer, in 1771, and it has been in the Manning family ever since. The main block of the house is a 2 1/2-story colonial structure with a gambrel roof, which is rare in Andover for the period. Its main entrance is into a projected central vestibule, and there are a series of additions added to the back of the house.

The house was listed on the National Register of Historic Places in 1982.

== See also ==
- National Register of Historic Places listings in Andover, Massachusetts
- National Register of Historic Places listings in Essex County, Massachusetts
