= Lima Memorial Health System =

- ProMedica

Geography
- Location: Lima, Ohio, United States
- Coordinates: 40°44′08″N 84°05′09″W

Organization
- Care system: Public
- Affiliated university: None

Services
- Emergency department: Level II trauma center

History
- Opened: 1899

Links
- Website: http://www.limamemorial.org/
- Lists: Hospitals in Ohio

Lima Memorial Health System was founded in 1899 as Lima City Hospital by the citizens of the Lima, Ohio community. The hospital is a not-for-profit health care organization with more than 1,500 employees, and 25 facilities in their 10-county service area in the region. Lima Memorial Health System also offers an extended network of primary care, pediatric and specialist physicians in their Lima Memorial Physicians (LMP) group. The hospital is an affiliate of ProMedica.

== See also ==
- ProMedica Health System
- The Toledo Hospital
- Toledo Children's Hospital
- Flower Hospital
