= Bigsby =

Bigsby may refer to:

- Christopher Bigsby (born 1941), British literary analyst and novelist
- John Jeremiah Bigsby (1792-1881), English physician and geologist
  - Bigsby Medal, a medal of the Geological Society of London established by John Jeremiah Bigsby
- Paul Bigsby (1899–1968), American guitar maker, inventor and motorcycle racer/mechanic
  - Bigsby Electric Guitars, a company named after Paul Bigsby
  - Bigsby vibrato tailpiece, a vibrato device for electric guitars invented by Paul Bigsby
- Robert Bigsby (1806–73), English antiquarian and author
- Tank Bigsby (born 2001), American football player

== See also ==
- Bigsby & Kruthers, a high-profile men's clothier in Chicago 1970-2000
- Bixby (disambiguation)
- Chandler-Bigsby-Abbot House, a historic house in Andover, Massachusetts
