= Bixby =

Bixby may refer to:

== People ==
- Bixby (surname)
- Bixby family, a prominent southern California family
- Bixby, character in Dominion (TV series)

== Places ==
- Bixby, Minnesota, an unincorporated community
- Bixby, Missouri, an unincorporated community
- Bixby, Oklahoma, a city
- Bixby, South Dakota, a ghost town
- Bixby, Texas, a census-designated place
- Bixby Knolls, California, a neighborhood in Long Beach
- Bixby State Preserve, Iowa
- Bixby, Nevada, a fictional town in the Tremors franchise.

== Technology ==
- Bixby (software), a virtual assistant by Samsung Electronics

== Other uses ==
- Bixby, a Beanie Baby bear produced by Ty, Inc.
- Bixby Creek Bridge, an arch bridge in Big Sur, California
- The Bixby land companies, ranching and land-development companies in California
- The Bixby letter, written by Abraham Lincoln
- Bixby Medical Center, a public hospital in Adrian, Michigan
- Bixby Ranch, an alternative name for Rancho Los Alamitos, California
- Bixby Shinola shoe polish and Bixby Bicycle by the same company
- AMD's Bixby chipset architecture codename.

== See also ==
- "Mrs. Bixby and the Colonel's Coat", 1959 short story by Roald Dahl
- Bigsby (disambiguation)
