= Ballardvale, Massachusetts =

- Village
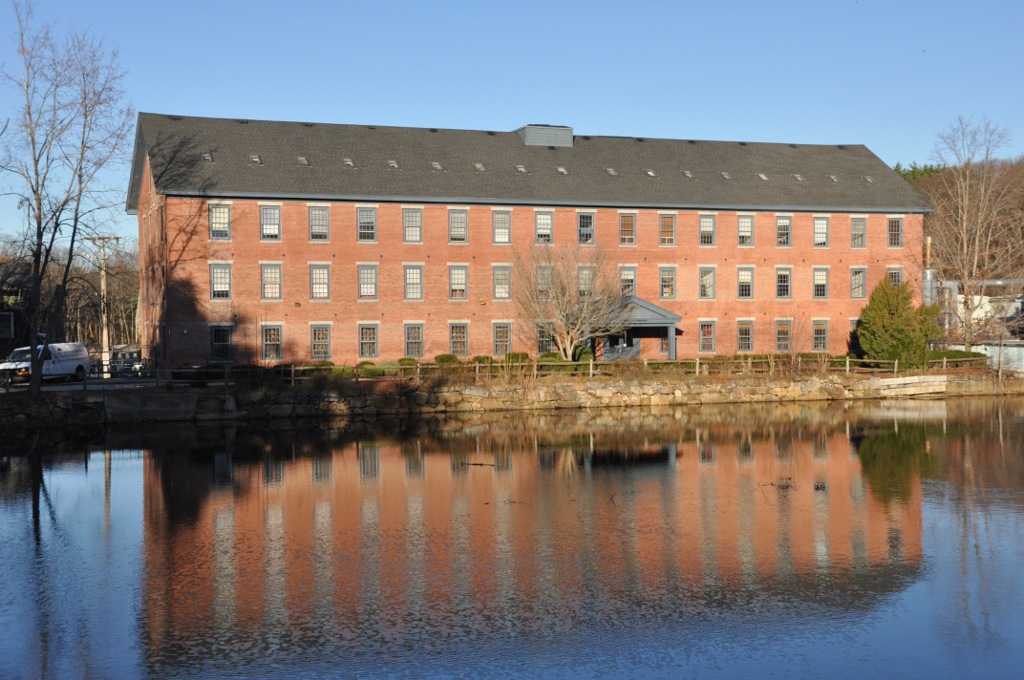
- Nickname: BallardVale or Ballard Vale
- Location within Massachusetts Location within the United States
- Coordinates: 42°37′30″N 71°09′38″W
- Country: United States
- State: Massachusetts
- County: Essex
- Town: Andover
- Time zone: UTC-5 (Eastern)
- Zip Code: 01810

Ballardvale (sometimes written archaically as BallardVale or Ballard Vale) is a village located within the boundaries of the town of Andover, Essex County, Massachusetts, United States. Growing originally in the 19th century around mills located on the Shawsheen River, the village is a local historic district, boasting many varieties of historic architecture and a rich industrial heritage.

== History ==
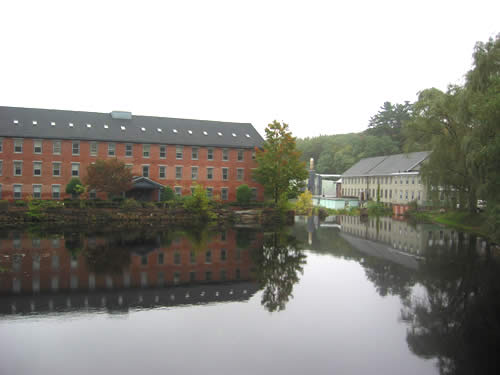
Ballardvale, Massachusetts

In the 18th century, the Shawsheen River and its water power attracted the Ballard Family, who came and built grist and saw mills. At this time the area became known as Ballard's Vale, eventually Ballardvale.

In 1836, John and William Marland established the Ballardvale Manufacturing Company. The company produced the first wool worsted made in America, as well as the first wool flannel. Additional mills were built and shoes, carriages, locomotives, and stoneware pottery were also made in Ballard Vale. However, it was white flannels that made the village famous: Ballard Vale white flannels won prizes at the Columbian and Louisiana Purchase expositions.

By 1848, two mills, the Ballardvale Manufacturing Company and Whipple File Company, a factory-owned store, a schoolhouse, a railroad depot and houses were nestled in the Vale. Streets were laid out and previously undeveloped land was subdivided into house lots and many residences were built.

The village continued to revolve around manufacturing for many years, until the mid-20th century when most manufacturing, especially fabric mills, moved out of New England.

== Shawsheen River ==
The Shawsheen River has always played an important role in Ballardvale, powering its earliest mills. The Ballardvale Millpond and dam on Andover Street are focal points of the area.

By the start of the 20th century, Ballardvale had become a center for river outings. Couples paddled canoes along the Shawsheen or took rides on the motor yacht William Ballard. The river remains popular with canoeists. A prominent access point is adjacent to the dam.

Today the Shawsheen River Reservation, owned and operated by the Andover Village Improvement Society (A.V.I.S.), runs along the river from the village towards central Andover. The reservation is designed both to preserve natural resources and to provide space for passive reservation, such as walking. The Shawsheen River is home to many animals like geese, swans, and many kinds of fish.

== Historic architecture ==
Ballardvale is home to many fine examples of 19th-century architecture. Styles represented include Greek Revival, Gothic Revival, Italianate, and Queen Anne style Victorian. Historic homes include both those originally occupied by mill workers as well as mill owners. Ballardvale is a locally recognized Historic District, with specialized zoning regulating changes made to properties in the area.

== Transportation ==
The railroad has always been important to Ballardvale, with a rail line running north–south through the village. Local as well as distance trains ran through the village starting on July 3, 1848. According to Boston & Maine railroad reports, a 'large and commodious station house' was built. In 1881, 56 feet of the original 135 feet of the station was turned 90 degrees and moved to 174 Andover Street, where it still exists. This portion of the station remained the property of B&M railroad until 1925. The other 78 feet was torn down around 1950. Today "Ballardvale" is a stop on the Haverhill line of the commuter rail operated by the Massachusetts Bay Transportation Authority (MBTA). Pan Am Railways freight trains also run regularly through the village. There is a gated railroad crossing at the intersection of Andover and Tewksbury Streets.

Interstate 93 passes through Ballardvale, with one exit serving the village directly at Dascomb Road. This exit also serves Andover proper and Tewksbury.

== Other village features ==
Despite being located within the larger town of Andover, Ballardvale is still a functioning village, with its own local resources.

A U.S. Post Office, fire station, pizza parlor, and retail shops are all located along Andover Street.

The village is home to two churches. The historic St. Joseph's on High Vale Street, built in 1881, is a "mission church" of St. Augustine's in downtown Andover, and remains open for Sunday Mass. Ballardvale United, on Clark Road, was formed in 1955 after the union of two smaller churches, the Union Congregational Church and Methodist Episcopal Church.

The Ballardvale Green is a small park located at the intersection of Andover Street and Center Street. Across the way is a large playground, where generations of children have played. The site was for many years occupied by a large public boarding house.

Located around the corner on Clark Road, the Burns Reservation, owned and operated by the Andover Village Improvement Society (A.V.I.S.) is 5-acre (20,000 m^{2}) tract of undeveloped woods and wetland.

The Union Congregational Church still stands, though it has been altered by multiple fires. In the 1970s it was used as a paint/hardware store. After another fire it was rebuilt as a residence.

== See also ==
- Ballardvale District
