= ProMedica Bixby Hospital =

- ProMedica Health System

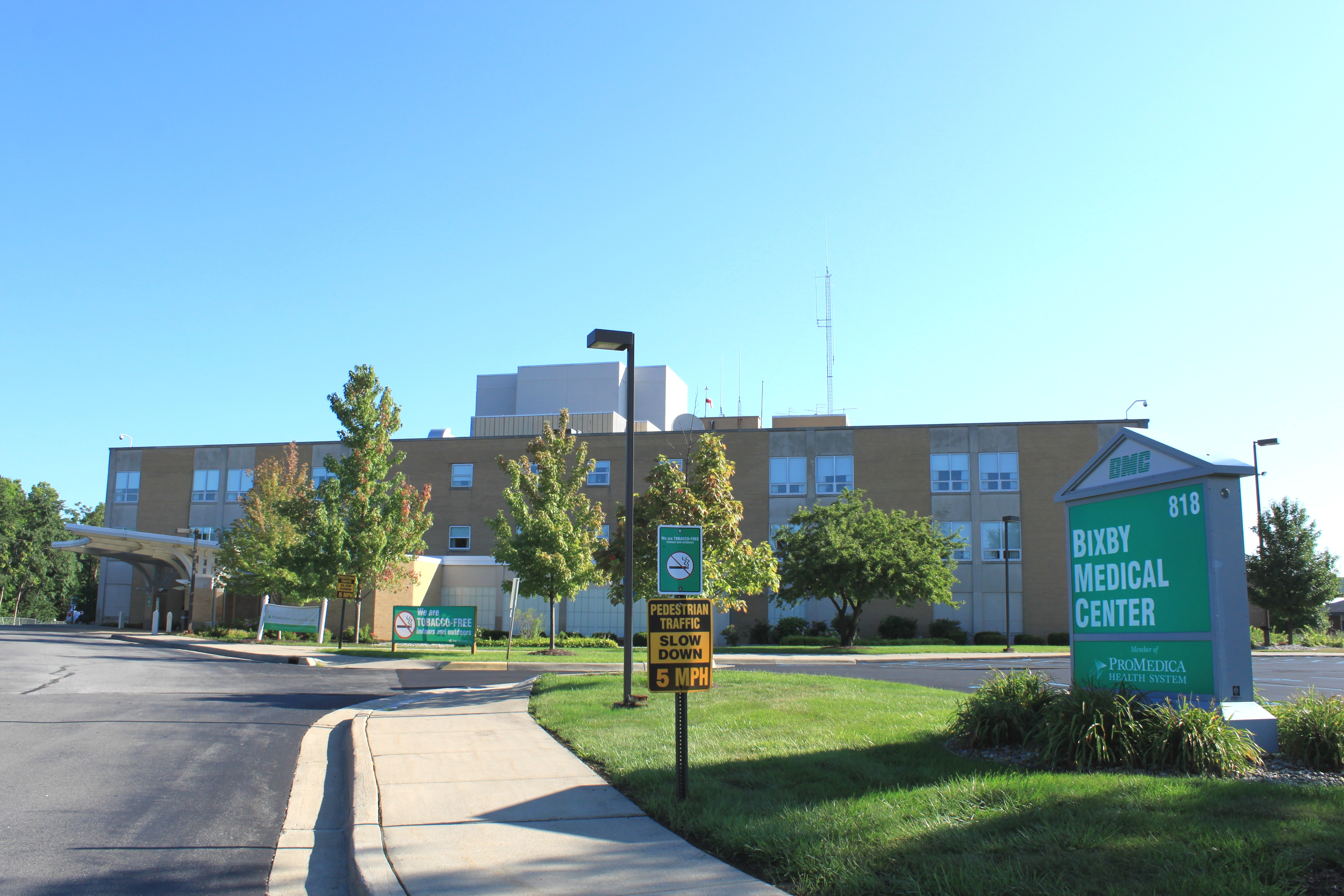

Geography
- Location: Adrian, Michigan, United States
- Coordinates: 41.91352°N 84.0492°W

Organization
- Care system: Public
- Type: Community
- Affiliated university: None

Services
- Emergency department: Yes
- Beds: 88

History
- Opened: 1911

Links
- Website: https://www.promedica.org/bixby-hospital/Pages/default.aspx
- Lists: Hospitals in Michigan

ProMedica Bixby Hospital (formerly Bixby Medical Center) was a public hospital in Adrian, Michigan that was part of the ProMedica Health System. It was replaced in 2020 with Charles and Virginia Hickman Hospital. The new hospital also replaced Herrick Medical Center in Tecumseh.
