= Holt Farm (Andover, Massachusetts) =

- U.S. National Register of Historic Places
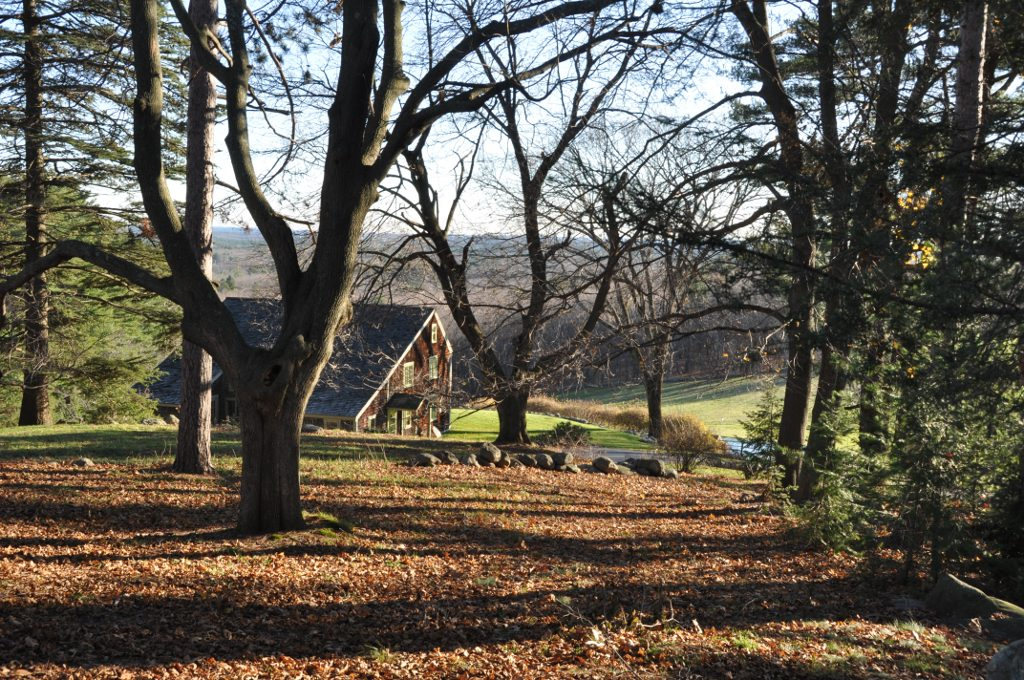

- Location within Massachusetts Location within the United States
- Location: Andover, Massachusetts
- Coordinates: 42°38′17″N 71°6′34″W
- Built: 1714
- Architect: Holt, Timothy (3)
- Architectural style: Georgian
- MPS: Town of Andover MRA
- NRHP reference No.: 82004819
- Added to NRHP: June 10, 1982

Holt Farm is a historic farm built in 1714 by Nicholas Holt's (1) grandson Timothy Holt (3) and located at 89 Prospect Road in Andover, Massachusetts. The house was built on the highest point in Essex County on land granted in Nicholas Holt (1). In Colonial times the Hill was referred to as Holt Hill but was changed in the late 19th century to Prospect Hill, but reverted to its original name in the early 20th century..6ed.

The first Holt in Andover was Nicholas Holt (1), an early officer of the town, who was a tanner who also ran the ferry across the Shawsheen River. Nicholas Holt's (1) grandson Timothy Holt (3) built his house on the land granted to his father James Holt (2) who was granted the original 100 acres from his father, Nicholas (1). Despite some evidence that Nicholas himself was barely literate, his descendants became known for their academic accomplishments with a long line of ministers and teachers.

Early settlers of Andover, some the Holts, who settled on the "Stoney Plaine", west of Holt Hill, lived near Scotsman Robert Russell (1) 1630–1710., in the part of Andover long known as the 'Scotland District.

Holt Hill and its environs are actually in the Holt District, and named for the local school houses in each neighborhood. Russell, the first person to be interred in the newly designated South Parish burying ground in 1710, had ten children, three of whom married Holts from nearby Holt Farm.

Much of the original Holt Farm now forms portions of the Ward Reservation and is owned by The Trustees of Reservations as a public park.

== See also ==
- National Register of Historic Places listings in Andover, Massachusetts
- National Register of Historic Places listings in Essex County, Massachusetts
