= Bixby (surname) =

Bixby is a surname. Notable people with the surname include:

- Anna Pierce Hobbs Bixby (1812–1873), American physician
- Bella Bixby (born 1995), American soccer player
- Bill Bixby (1934–1993), American actor and director
- Carl Bixby (1895-1978), American writer
- Fanny Bixby (1879–1930), American philanthropist and activist better known as Fanny Bixby Spencer
- Francis M. Bixby (1828–1905), New York politician
- Horace Ezra Bixby (1826–1912), steamboat pilot and captain, inventor, teacher of Mark Twain
- James Thompson Bixby (1843–1921), Unitarian minister and writer
- Jaydee Bixby (born 1990), Canadian country musician
- Jerome Bixby (1923–1998), American short story writer, editor and scriptwriter
- Jonathan Bixby (1959–2001), American costume designer
- Lenore E. Bixby (1914–1994), American statistician
- Lydia Parker Bixby (1801–1878), American widow, recipient of an 1864 letter from Abraham Lincoln
- Maynard Bixby (1853–1935), American mineralogist
- Moses Bixby (1827–1901), American pastor
- Norma Bixby (born 1941), member of the Montana House of Representatives (2000–present)
- Peter Bixby, member of the New Hampshire House of Representatives (2012–2022)
- Robert E. Bixby (born 1945), American mathematician
- Robert L. Bixby (born 1955), executive director of the Concord Coalition
- Sarah Bixby (1871–1935), California writer better known as Sarah Bixby Smith
- Tams Bixby (1855–1922), American newspaper editor and publisher
- William Herbert Bixby (1849–1928), U.S. Army brigadier general and Chief of Engineers
- William K. Bixby (1857–1931), American art collector
