= ProMedica Herrick Hospital =

- ProMedica Health System

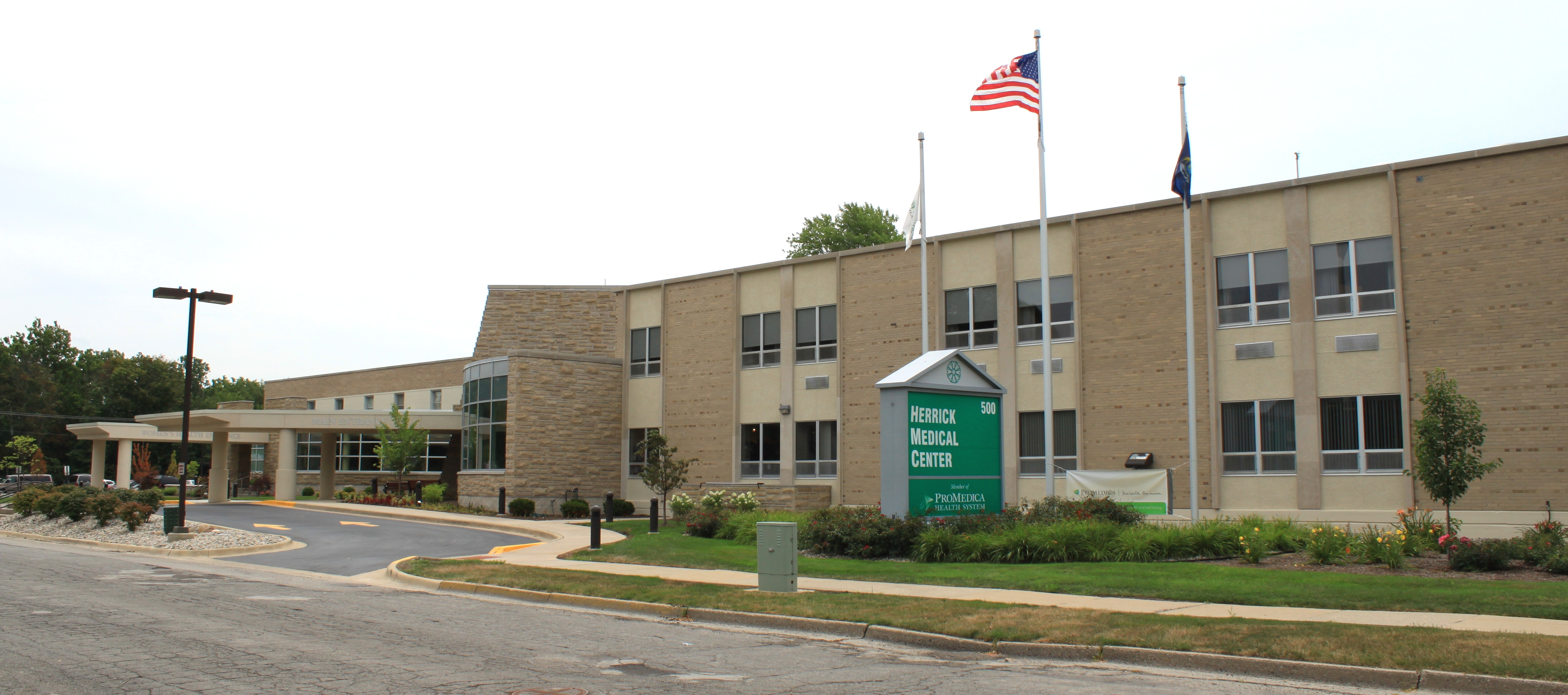
- ProMedica Herrick Hospital

Geography
- Location: Tecumseh, Michigan, United States
- Coordinates: 42.00255°N 83.93738°W

Organization
- Care system: Public

Services
- Beds: 25

Links
- Website: www.promedica.org/herrick
- Lists: Hospitals in Michigan

ProMedica Herrick Hospital was a public hospital in Tecumseh, Michigan that is part of the ProMedica Health System. It closed in September 2020 and was replaced by Charles and Virginia Hickman Hospital in Adrian, which also replaced Bixby Memorial Hospital in Adrian.

On July 3, 2023 a public notice was made for the announcement of a purchase agreement for the Herrick Hospital property by Behavioral Heath Solutions Center.

== See also ==
- ProMedica Health System
- The Toledo Hospital
- Toledo Children's Hospital
- Flower Hospital
