= Ann Foster =

American woman accused of witchcraft (c. 1617–1692)

Ann Foster (c. 1617 – December 3, 1692) was an Andover widow accused of witchcraft during the Salem witch trials.

== Life and family ==
Ann married Andrew Foster and settled in Andover, Massachusetts. They had five children: Andrew, Abraham, Sarah (Mrs. Kemp), Hannah (Mrs. Stone, whose husband, Hugh Stone, killed her in a drunken rage in 1689, and was hanged), and Mary (Mrs. Lacey).

== Accusation and trial ==
In 1692, when a woman named Elizabeth Ballard came down with a fever that baffled doctors, witchcraft was suspected, and a search for the responsible witch began. Two afflicted girls from Salem village, Ann Putnam and Mary Walcott, were taken to Andover to seek out the witch, and fell into fits at the sight of Ann Foster.

Ann, seven years a widow, was arrested and taken to Salem prison. Foster's daughter, Mary Foster Lacey Sr, and her daughter, named Mary Lacey Jr, were accused of witchcraft as well.

A close reading of the trial transcripts reveals Ann resisted confessing to the crimes she was accused of, despite being "put to the question" (i.e. tortured) multiple times over a period of days.

Her resolve broke when her daughter, Mary Lacey Sr., similarly accused of witchcraft, accused her own mother Ann of the crime, likely to save herself and her child. Ann's subsequent confession was an apparent attempt to shield her daughter.

== Death ==
Convicted, Ann died in the Salem jail on December 3, 1692, aged around 75, after 21 weeks of imprisonment before the trials were discredited and ended. Her son, Abraham, later petitioned the authorities to clear her name ("remove the attainder") and reimburse the family for the expenses associated with her incarceration and burial; the petition is also posted here.

== Notes ==
- Trial Transcript of Ann Foster
- Alternate site for Transcript
- Ray, B.C. (2015). Satan and Salem: The Witch-Hunt Crisis of 1692. University of Virginia Press. pp. 145–46. ISBN 978-0-8139-3708-3; retrieved July 30, 2016.
- Beau, B.F.L. (2016). The Story of the Salem Witch Trials. Routledge. p. 127. ISBN 978-1-315-50904-4; retrieved July 30, 2016.
- Bresette, Luci. "Salem Witch Trials Investigation..."; retrieved September 13, 2016.
