= Haggetts Pond =

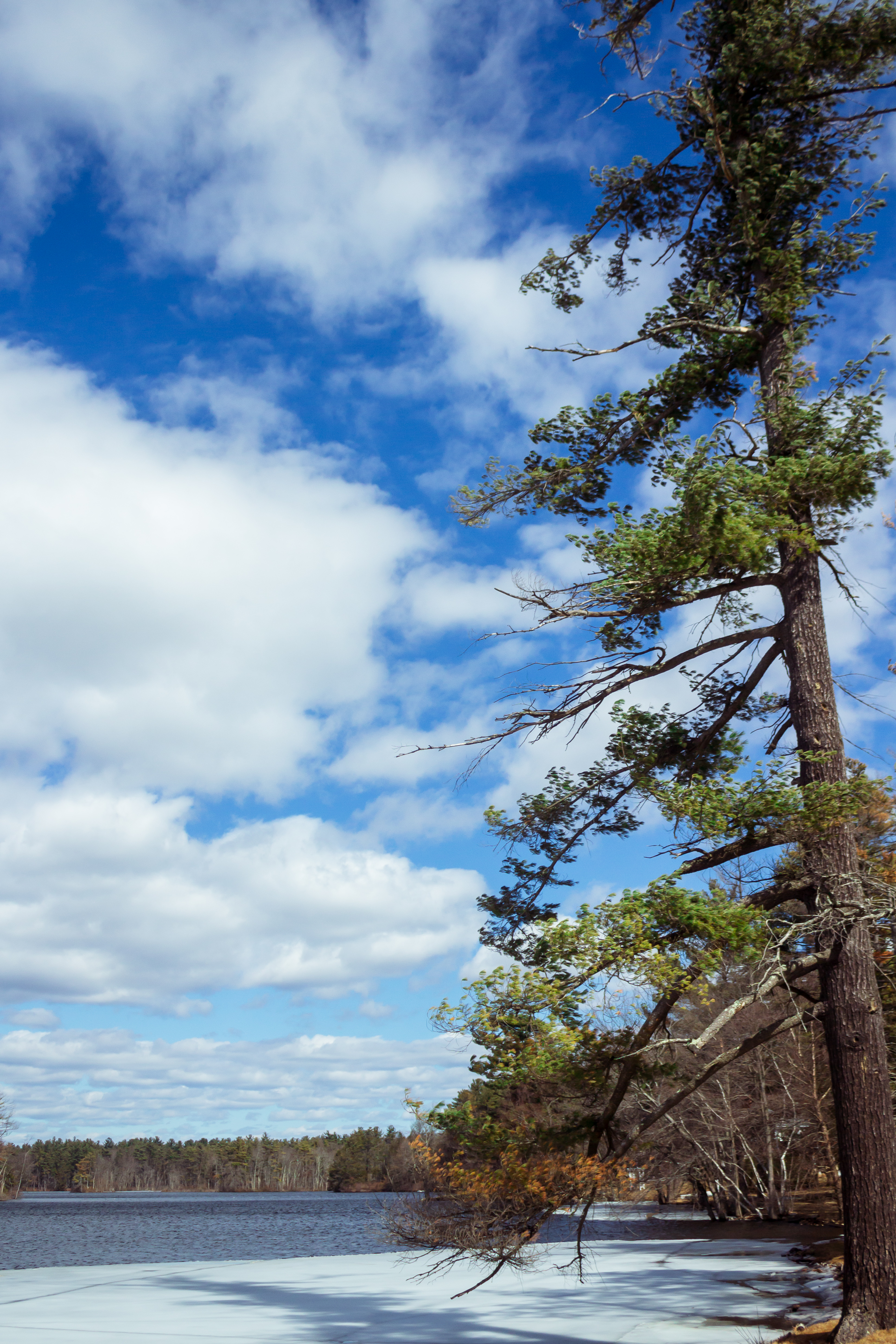
- View of the pond in winter

- Location within Massachusetts Location within the United States
- Location: Andover, Massachusetts
- Coordinates: 42°38′55″N 71°11′59″W
- Lake type: reservoir
- Basin countries: United States
- Surface elevation: 115 ft (35 m)

Haggetts Pond is the reservoir for the town of Andover, Massachusetts, United States. It is located in the western part of the town and also lends its name to a road. The Merrimack River is connected to the pond to add volume to the reservoir.

It is bordered by Route 133 on the south. Not far to the northwest is Interstate 495; to the northeast is Interstate 93. Permissible activities include walking, hiking, jogging biking and fishing. Only registered rowboats are allowed on the reservoir and fishing must be done from either the shoreline or a rowboat (no hip waders). Canoeing or kayaking, windsurfing, sailing, ice skating and ice fishing are prohibited. Swimming, bathing, wading and pets in the water are also prohibited.

Hiking trails, including the Haggetts Pond Rail Trail over the former Lowell and Lawrence Railroad right of way, encircle the pond. The Haggetts Pond Rail Trail construction project began in May 2025 and opened in April 2026, building a paved and ADA-compliant trail, including a wooden boardwalk overlooking the pond.

The Pond also gives its name to a road (Haggetts Pond Road) that starts to the west of the pond itself. Haggetts Pond Road transverses Route 133, but the vast majority of its length is on the side north of the pond. (Of the 245 houses on Haggetts Pond Road, 240 of them are on the north side.)
