= Andover Village Improvement Society =

Private land trust in Andover, Massachusetts

The Andover Village Improvement Society (AVIS) is a private land trust in Andover, Massachusetts. Founded in 1894, AVIS is the second oldest land preservation society in the United States. Its goal is to acquire land within Andover and preserve it in its natural state.

The organization controls 29 reservations totaling about 1,100 acres (4.5 km^{2}), with 30 miles (48 km) of trails for hiking, skiing, or other passive recreational use. The largest AVIS reservations are Deer Jump at 131 acres (0.53 km^{2}), Goldsmith at 170 acres (0.69 km^{2}), and Rafton at 226 acres (0.91 km^{2}). Motor vehicles, hunting, fires, or camping in these conservation lands are prohibited. Volunteer wardens are responsible for the care and oversight of each reservation.

With the rapid suburbanization and development occurring in Andover since the 1970s, AVIS has played a vital role in preserving Andover's land.

== Properties ==
As of June 2017, AVIS owns 30 sites with approximately 1,100 acres (4.5 km^{2}).

Reservation	Size (acres)	Date Acquired	Location
Baker's Meadow	59	1958	Argilla Road, Reservation Road
Burns Reservation	5		Clark Road in Ballardvale section, Chester Street (parking)
Collins Reservation	4.6	1983	Pine St. in northeast section
Christopher and Lillian Sherman Reservation	5.5	2004	Haggetts Pond Rd.
Deer Jump Reservation	131	1960-1973	Merrimack River west of I-93
Goldsmith Woodlands	170	1977	East of Foster's Pond
Greene Reservation	26	1969	Bordered by Dascomb and Bannister roads and Andover Street
Hammond Reservation	38		Salem Street, adjacent to Skug Reservation
Indian Ridge Reservation	40	1897	Near Andover High School, Reservation Road
Keck Reservation	49	1963–1968, 2008	Route 125 opposite of State Police barracks
Lupine Reservation	2		Corner of Central Street and Lupine Road
Purdon Reservation	9	1964, 2001	Central Street, Lupine Road
Rafton Reservation	226		NE of High Plain Road, NW of I-495, and SW of I-93.
Sakowich Reservation	9	2011	Oriole Drive
Sanborn Reservation	26	1959,1966,2015	S of Shawsheen river adjacent to I-93.
Shawsheen River Reservation	27	1963	Central Street, Abbot Bridge Drive
Skug Reservation	75		Salem Street
Smith Reservation	54	1963	
Spalding Reservation	16	1973	River Road near the Tewksbury border
Stanley Reservation	8	1988	
Sunset Rock Reservation	9		
Taft Reservation	62	1960s,1997	Salem Street, Wildwood Road, Vine Street
Vale Reservation	47		
West Parish Meadow	28	1992	Reservation Road near West Parish Church
Wilkinson Reservation	23	1981	Woburn Street

== See also ==
Trustees of Reservations
Harold Parker State Forest
Ward Reservation
