= Lenore E. Bixby =

American statistician

Leonore E. Bixby
- Born: Lenore Alice Epstein; August 12, 1914; Buffalo, New York
- Died: April 5, 1994 (aged 79)
- Occupation: Statistician
- Organization(s): Social Security Administration; National Academy of Sciences

Lenore Alice Epstein Bixby (August 12, 1914 – April 5, 1994) was an American statistician who worked with the Social Security Administration and the National Academy of Sciences.

== Education ==
She was born in Buffalo, New York, and some of her earlier publications are listed under that name. As a student of the class of 1935 at Wellesley College, she became chairman of the school's branch of the League of Women Voters, and graduated Phi Beta Kappa with honors as a Senior Durant Scholar. She did graduate study in economics and statistics at Columbia University, earning a master's degree there in 1937.

== Career ==
After completing her studies, she came to work for the Bureau of Labor Statistics and then, after World War II, as an operations officer for the Marshall Plan. This work took her away from Washington to Paris. She joined the Social Security Administration in 1954, and worked there as deputy assistant commissioner of the Office of Research and Statistics and later as director of the Division of Retirement and Survivors' Studies. While there, she married F. Lovell Bixby, a prominent penologist, who died in 1975.

She retired from the administration in 1977, but continued to work as a statistician for the National Academy of Sciences, in their Committee on National Statistics.

== Awards and honors ==
In 1969, she was honored by the American Statistical Association, who elected her as one of their fellows. She was also a fellow of the Gerontological Society. She was a founding member of the National Academy of Social Insurance.
