= Andover, Massachusetts =

Andover
- Town
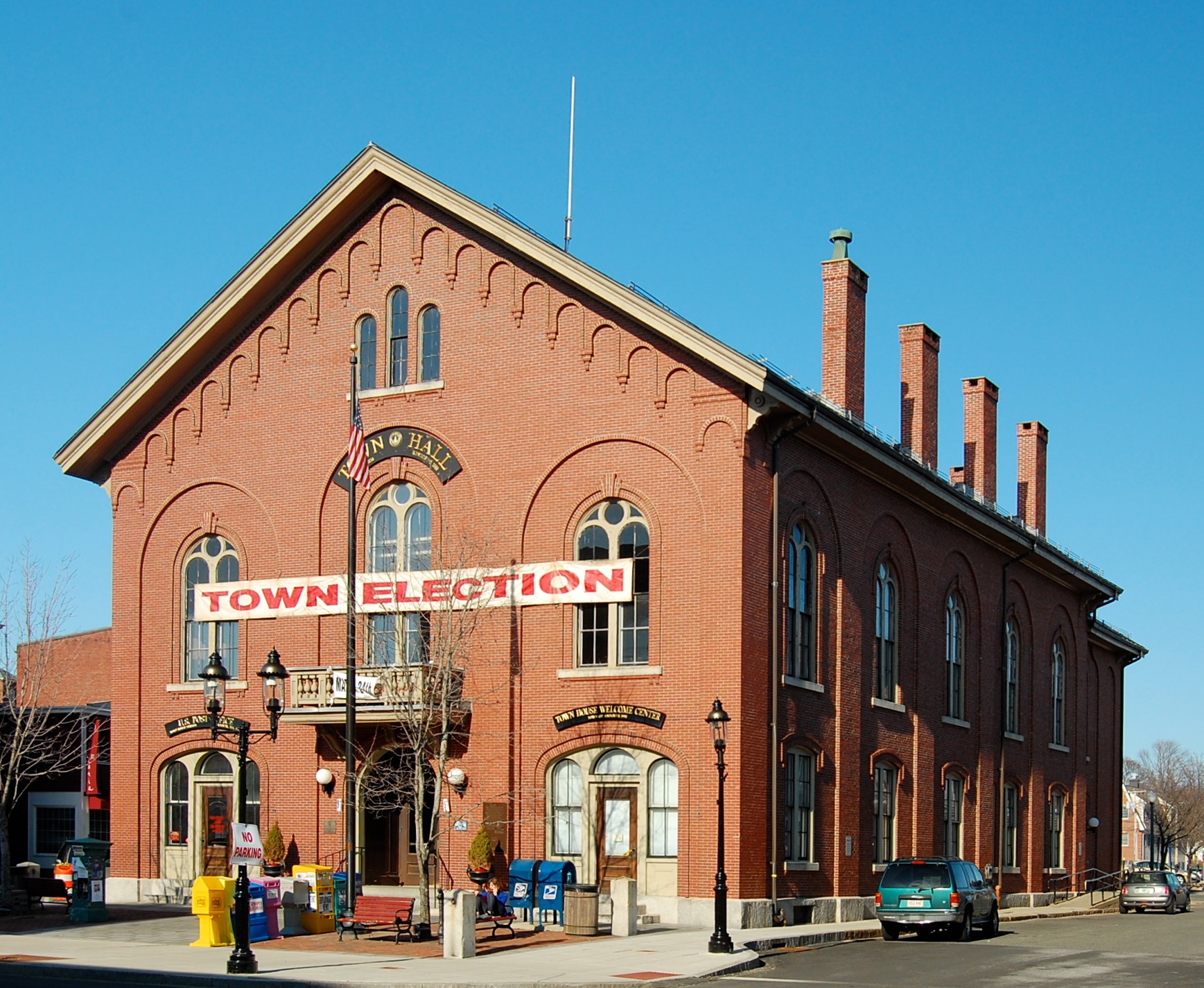
- Andover's Old Town Hall, located in downtown Andover

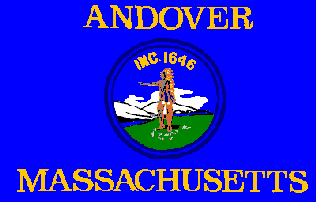
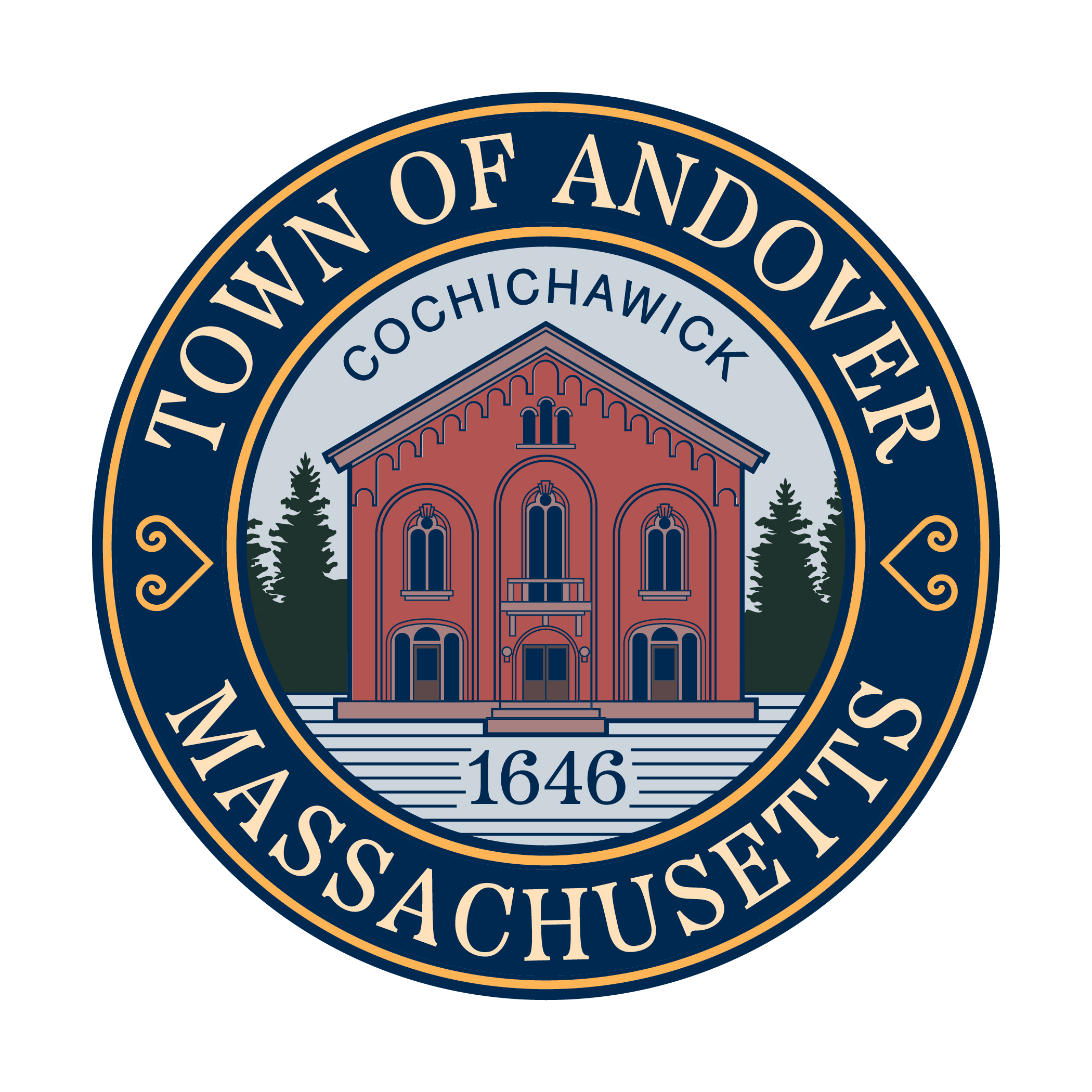
- Flag Seal
- Motto: "Home of America"
- Location in Essex County and the state of Massachusetts

- Location within Massachusetts Location within the United States Location within North America
- Coordinates: 42°39′27″N 71°08′27″W
- Country: United States
- State: Massachusetts
- County: Essex
- Region: New England
- Settled: 1634
- Incorporated: 1646
- Current geography: 1855

Government
  - Type: Open town meeting
  - Town Manager: Andrew P. Flanagan
  - Select Board: Alexander J. Vispoli; Ellen Townson; Laura M. Gregory; Melissa Danisch; Kevin Coffey

Area
  - Total: 32.1 sq mi (83.2 km^{2})
  - Land: 31.0 sq mi (80.3 km^{2})
  - Water: 1.1 sq mi (2.9 km^{2})
- Elevation: 180 ft (55 m)

Population (2020)
  - Total: 36,569
  - Density: 1,179/sq mi (455.4/km^{2})
- Time zone: UTC−5 (Eastern)
  - Summer (DST): UTC−4 (Eastern)
- ZIP Code: 01810
- Area code: 351/978
- FIPS code: 25-01465
- GNIS feature ID: 0619444
- Website: The Official Website of Andover, Massachusetts

Andover is a town in Essex County, Massachusetts, United States. It was settled in 1642 and incorporated in 1646. At the 2020 census, the population was 36,569. It is located 20 miles (32 km) north of Boston and 4 miles (6.4 km) south of Lawrence. Part of the town comprises the census-designated place of Andover. It is twinned with its namesake: Andover, Hampshire, England.

== History ==
Native Americans inhabited what is now northeastern Massachusetts for thousands of years prior to European colonization of the Americas. At the time of European arrival, Massachusett and Naumkeag people inhabited the area south of the Merrimack River and Pennacooks inhabited the area to the north. The Massachusett referred to the area that would later be renamed Andover as Cochichawick. Cochichawick was transferred to English settlers on May 16, 1649, by the Sagamore of the Massachusett, Cutshamache. He sold the land known as Cochichawick to Mr. John Woodbrige for the price of 6 pounds and a coat, which he had already received, as well as an agreement that the Massachusett people be allowed to catch alewives in the Cochichawick River.

=== Establishment and incorporation ===
In 1634, the Massachusetts General Court set aside a portion of land in what is now Essex County for an inland plantation, including parts of what is now Andover, North Andover and South Lawrence. In order to encourage settlement, early colonists were offered three years' immunity from taxes, levies, and services (apart from military service). The first permanent settlement in the Andover area was established in 1642 by John Woodbridge and a group of settlers from Newbury and Ipswich.

Shortly after they arrived, they purchased land from the Massachusett sachem Cutshamekin for "six pounds of currency and a coat" on the condition that a local company of indigenous people headed by a man named Roger be allowed to plant corn and take alewives from a local water source. Roger's Brook, a small stream which cuts through the eastern part of town, is named in his honor.

In May 1646 the settlement was incorporated as a town and was named Andover. This name was likely chosen in honor of the town of Andover in England, which was near the original home of some of the first residents. The first recorded town meeting was held in 1656 in the home of settler John Osgood in what is now North Andover.

The old burying ground in what is now North Andover marks the center of the early town. Contrary to popular belief, the towns split due to the location of the Old North Church, also located in what is now North Andover. The villagers from the southwestern part of the town were tired of walking all the way to the extreme north of what was then Andover and decided to build their own South Church central to what is now Andover.

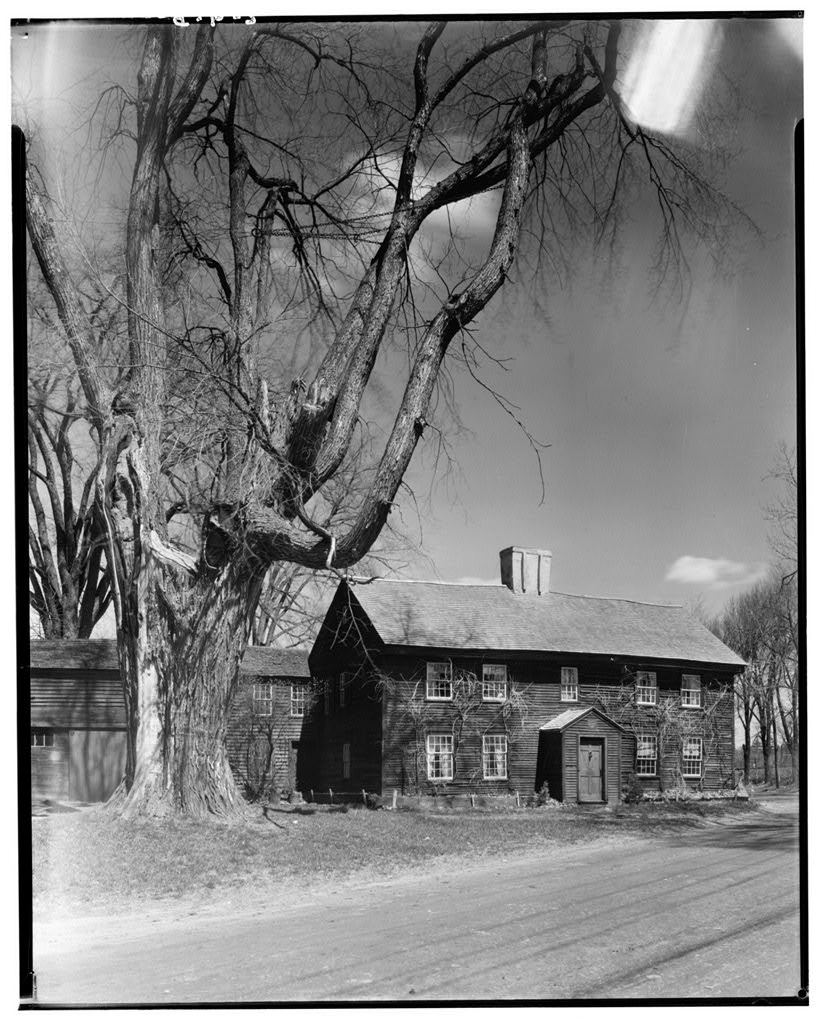
Benjamin Abbott farmhouse, Andover, 1934

=== Witchcraft ===
During the 1692 Salem witch trials, Andover resident Joseph Ballard asked for help for his wife from several girls in the neighboring Salem Village who were already identifying witches there. After visiting Elizabeth Ballard, the girls claimed that several people in Andover had bewitched her: Ann Foster, her daughter Mary Lacey Sr. and her granddaughter Mary Lacey Jr. During the course of the legal proceedings, more than 40 Andover citizens, mostly women and their children, were formally accused of having made a covenant with the Devil. Three Andover residents, Martha Carrier, Mary Parker, and Samuel Wardwell, were convicted and executed. Five others either pleaded guilty at arraignment or were convicted at trial: Ann Foster, Mary Lacey Sr., and Abigail Faulkner Sr. (daughter of Andover's minister, Francis Dane) in 1692 and Wardwell's wife Sarah and Rev. Dane's granddaughter, Elizabeth Johnson Jr. in 1693. Those who were not executed were granted reprieves by Gov. William Phips, but the convictions remained on their records. In 1713, in response to petitions initiated in 1703 by Abigail Faulkner Sr. and Sarah Wardwell, Massachusetts Governor Joseph Dudley reversed the attainder on the names of those who were convicted in the episode.

=== Division of the town ===
By 1705, Andover's population had begun to move southward and the idea of a new meeting house in the south end of town was proposed. This was strongly opposed by the people living near the original meeting house in the north, but the dispute was finally settled in 1709 when the Great and General Court divided Andover into two parishes, North and South. After the division of the two parishes, South Andover established the South Church and South Parish "Burying-Yard," as it was called, with early Andover settler Robert Russell the first to be interred at age 80 in December 1710. But despite this split, the town remained politically one unit.

For many years, Andover was geographically one of the largest towns in the Commonwealth of Massachusetts; in 1826 a third parish was established and West Parish Church was constructed on Reservation Road.

In 1855, Andover divided into two separate political units according to the old parish boundaries. The name Andover was assumed by the West and South parishes, while the name North Andover was given to the North Parish. How those names were decided upon is still debated to this day, from the reasons being money being paid to one town to keep the name, to there being a controversy over a fire truck affecting the name change.

=== American Revolutionary War ===
Records show that on the morning of April 19, 1775, approximately 350 Andover men marched toward Lexington. Although they did not arrive in time for the battle that day, they did go on to participate in the battle of Bunker Hill two months later and fought in subsequent skirmishes with the Redcoats during the war.

Among the Andover men who were representatives to the Massachusetts Constitutional Convention of 1779–1780 were Colonel Samuel Osgood, Zebadiah Abbot, John Farnum and Samuel Phillips Jr. Phillips—who had founded Phillips Academy in 1778—was later appointed by John Adams to help draft the Massachusetts state constitution.

During the burning of Charlestown (June 17, 1775) Andover townspeople hiked to the top of Holt Hill to witness it. Holt Hill is the highest point in Essex County at 420 ft (130 m) and is currently part of the Charles W. Ward Reservation.

=== Post-Revolution Andover ===
In November 1798, David Brown led a group in Dedham, Massachusetts, in setting up a liberty pole with the words, "No Stamp Act, No Sedition Act, No Alien Bills, No Land Tax, downfall to the Tyrants of America; peace and retirement to the President; Love Live the Vice President," referring to then-President John Adams and Vice President Thomas Jefferson. Brown was arrested in Andover, but because he could not afford the $4,000 bail, he was taken to Salem for trial. Brown was tried in June 1799. Brown wanted to plead guilty but Justice Samuel Chase wanted him to name everybody who had helped him or who subscribed to his writings. Brown refused, was fined $480, and sentenced to eighteen months in prison, the most severe sentence then imposed under the Alien and Sedition Acts.

=== Death of President-elect Pierce's son ===
On January 4, 1853, Benjamin "Bennie" Pierce, the 11-year-old son of President-elect Franklin Pierce, was killed in a train accident in town. The Boston & Maine noon express, traveling from Boston to Lawrence, was moving at 40 miles per hour (64 km/h) when an axle broke. The only coach, in which Franklin Pierce was also riding, went down an embankment and broke in two. (The baggage car and locomotive remained on the track.) Pierce's son Benjamin was the only passenger killed, but it was initially reported that Franklin Pierce was also a fatality.

=== American Civil War ===
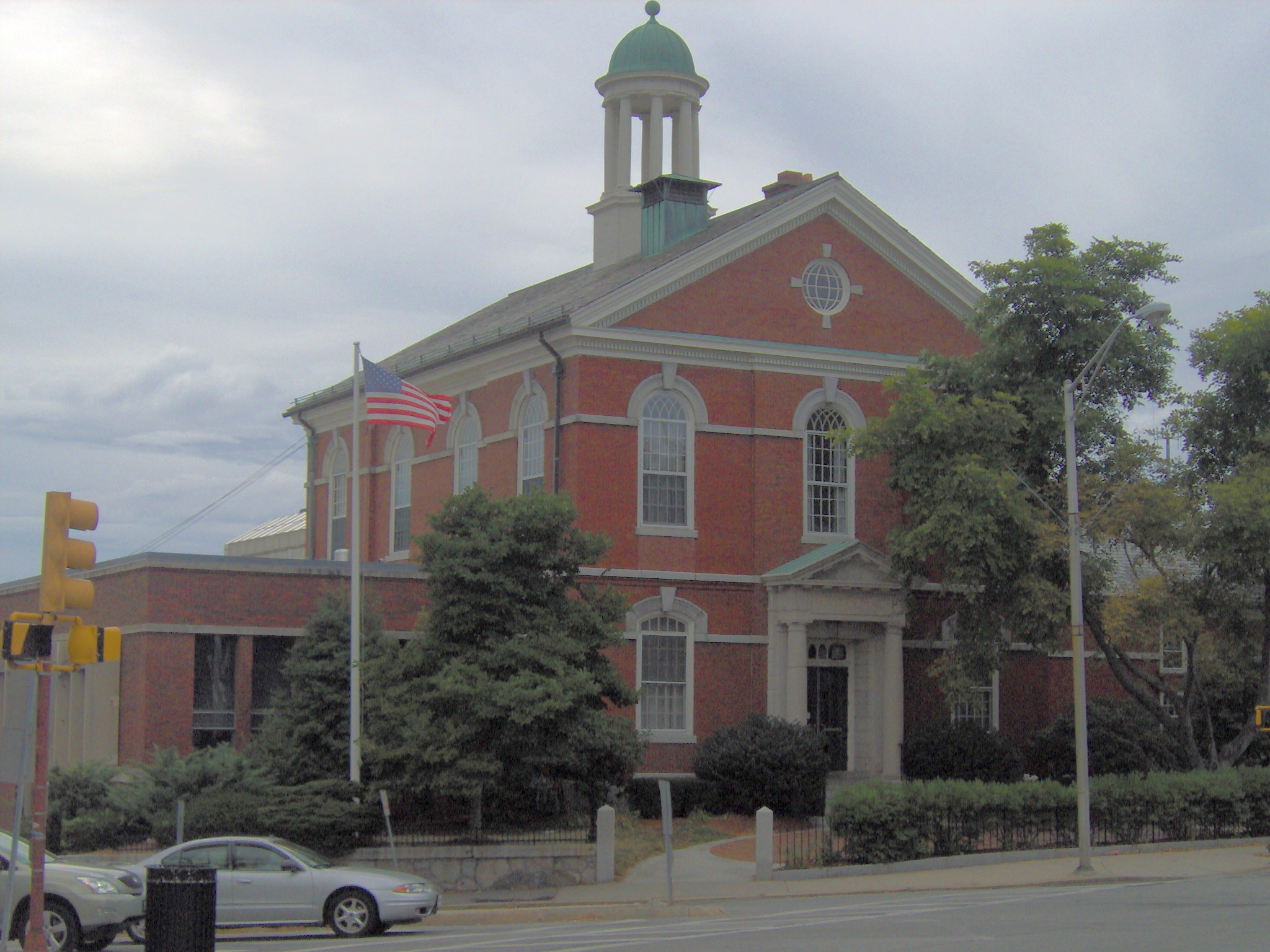
Memorial Hall Library, which was constructed in 1873 in memory of the 53 Andover men who lost their lives during the Civil War, was financed through private donations.

The anti-slavery movement had many supporters in Andover long before the Civil War began. William Jenkins – an ardent abolitionist and friend of William Lloyd Garrison – and several others provided stops on the Underground Railroad for runaway slaves. Harriet Beecher Stowe, author of Uncle Tom's Cabin, was a longtime resident. Her home, known as Stowe House, is now owned by Phillips Academy. Her body is buried in Phillips Academy's cemetery. When the Confederate Army shelled Fort Sumter in 1861, a company of 79 volunteers formed. By the time the war ended in 1865, six hundred Andover men had served in the Union Army.

=== Shawsheen Village ===
In 1919, the American Woolen Company announced plans to build a million dollar mill in the already-existing mill community of Frye Village and rename the region "Shawsheen." The village was completely rebuilt as a "model industrial community" and became the site of the company's headquarters. The mill began operating in 1922 and within two years the village contained more than 200 houses, several community buildings, a few tennis courts, a swimming area, a bowling green, an athletic field and a golf course. The employees rented their homes from the company; the brick structures were reserved for upper management and the wooden buildings for those of lesser position. This industrial utopia, however, was short-lived - by the early 1940s almost all of the houses and administration buildings were in private hands. The mills became a victim of changing technology as synthetic fibers became more popular than wool. The American Woolen Company closed its mills in 1953, and the buildings today house a variety of businesses, homes, and apartments. The village left its mark nationally, however, when its soccer team, the Shawsheen Indians, won the national soccer championship in 1925.

=== 2018 gas leaks and explosions ===
On September 13, 2018, several gas lines suffered leakage due to high pressure in the tubes of Columbia Gas of Massachusetts, a subsidiary of NiSource. As a result, several fires and explosions occurred, and homes were evacuated. At the conclusion of the event, over 70 houses suffered from gas-related explosions in the Andover-Lawrence area. Dozens of people were injured and one 18-year-old Lawrence resident was killed.

== Geography ==
According to the United States Census Bureau, the town has a total area of 32.1 square miles (83.2 km^{2}), of which 31.0 square miles (80.3 km^{2}) is land and 1.1 square miles (2.9 km^{2}) (3.49%) is water. Significant water areas include the Shawsheen River, Fosters Pond, Pomps Pond, and Haggetts Pond, located in west Andover, which serves as the town's reservoir. Haggetts Pond was originally set apart from other waters, but since the late 1990s has had waters added from the Merrimack River, which constitutes half of the town's northern border, to supplement the growing needs of the town. Andover is also home to the Harold Parker State Forest, the Trustees of Reservations' Charles W. Ward Reservation, as well as a very small portion of Lawrence's Den Rock Park. The town's Conservation Commission and privately non-profit A.V.I.S. (Andover Village Improvement Society) together own around 3000 acres in the town. Other notable reservations in the town include the Harold R. Rafton Reservation and the Deer Jump Reservation (along the banks of the Merrimack). The town is home to many glacial features including drumlins, eskers, and glacial erratics.

Andover's town center is located approximately four miles south of the center of Lawrence, and is 22 miles (35 km) north of Boston and 30 miles (48 km) southeast of Manchester, New Hampshire. Andover contains the westernmost point of Essex County, along the Merrimack River. It is bordered by Lawrence to the north, North Andover to the northeast, North Reading and Wilmington to the south, Tewksbury to the southwest. Andover also borders Methuen to the northwest; however, the boundary separation is formed by the Merrimack River.

== Demographics ==
Historical population
Year	Pop.	±%
1790	2,863	—
1800	2,941	+2.7%
1810	3,164	+7.6%
1820	3,889	+22.9%
1830	4,530	+16.5%
1840	5,207	+14.9%
1850	6,945	+33.4%
1860	4,765	−31.4%
1870	4,873	+2.3%
1880	5,169	+6.1%
1890	6,142	+18.8%
1900	6,813	+10.9%
1910	7,301	+7.2%
1920	8,268	+13.2%
1930	9,969	+20.6%
1940	11,122	+11.6%
1950	12,437	+11.8%
1960	17,134	+37.8%
1970	23,695	+38.3%
1980	26,370	+11.3%
1990	29,151	+10.5%
2000	31,247	+7.2%
2010	33,201	+6.3%
2020	36,569	+10.1%
2024*	36,927	+1.0%
* = population estimate. Source: United States census records and Population Estimates Program data.1790–1840 (Note: Population up to 1850 included present-day North Andover, incorporated in 1855.)

As of the census of 2000, there were 31,247 people, 11,305 households, and 8,490 families residing in the town. The population density was 1,007.8 inhabitants per square mile (389.1/km^{2}). There were 11,590 housing units at an average density of 144.3 persons/km^{2} (373.8 persons/sq mi). The racial makeup of the town was 91.60% White, 0.75% African American, 0.06% Native American, 5.73% Asian, 0.04% Pacific Islander, 0.84% from other races, and 0.99% from two or more races. 1.81% of the population were Hispanic or Latino of any race.

There were 11,305 households, out of which 40.3% had children under the age of 18 living with them, 65.6% were married couples living together, 7.5% had a woman whose husband does not live with her, and 24.9% were non-families. 21.6% of all households were made up of individuals, and 9.2% had someone living alone who was 65 years of age or older. The average household size was 2.74 and the average family size was 3.24.

In the town, the population was spread out, with 28.8% under the age of 18, 4.7% from 18 to 24, 27.5% from 25 to 44, 26.8% from 45 to 64, and 12.3% who were 65 years of age or older. The median age was 40 years. For every 100 females, there were 92.9 males. For every 100 females age 18 and over, there were 87.9 males.

According to a 2012 estimate, the median income for a household in the town was $118,324, the median family income was $144,685. Males with full-time year-round jobs had a median income higher than $100,000; for females, the median was $62,532. The per capita income for the town was $53,378. 2.6% of families and 4.2% of the population, including 3.7% of people aged under 18 years and 5.8% of people aged 65 and over, were below the poverty line.

Andover had 217 residents who filed as making at least $1 million (~$1.37 million in 2024) in 2011, accounting for one millionaire per every 157 people. The average income for millionaires in Andover was $2,441,000. Using income and other demographic data, Andover ranked 37 out of 490 in a ranking of wealthiest zipcodes in Massachusetts.

== Economy ==
There are several companies headquartered in Andover. One of many companies, Mercury Systems, is included in the S&P 400 Index. Another, Vicor Corporation, is a part of the S&P 600 Index. Andover also hosts regional offices for many multinational corporations such as Schneider Electric, Pfizer and Raytheon Technologies.

Internal Revenue Service (IRS) has the Andover Campus service center, which for many years accepted tax forms from several neighboring states. With increasing rates of e-filing, that function was threatened with phase-out in 2009. The federal employees' union, NTEU, in mid-2009 pushed for special consideration under the Troubled Asset Relief Program for employees threatened with losing jobs. In late 2009, the U.S. General Services Administration received money through the American Recovery and Reinvestment Act of 2009 to fund the $85 million green modernization of the 1967 building complex.

== Arts and culture ==
=== Points of interest ===
- Phillips Academy, a prep school founded in 1778 with many famous alumni.
- The Addison Gallery of American Art on the Phillips Academy campus is open to the public.
- The Andover Inn, an inn on the Phillips Academy campus.
- Andover is the site of a large factory owned by Raytheon, the builder of the Patriot Missile.
- Chandler-Bigsby-Abbot House, built in 1673, is the oldest house in Andover.
- Andover is home to the second oldest land preservation society in the country, the Andover Village Improvement Society (AVIS), which controls over 1,100 acres (4.5 km^{2}).
- Dundee Park, a historical mill district and current business park
- Lebanon maintains an honorary consulate on North Main Street, near the Lawrence line near the Andover train station.
- Harold Parker State Forest is located on the border between Andover, Middleton and North Reading.

== Government ==
The town manager is Andrew P. Flanagan, and the chair of the select board is Ellen Townson.

Andover presidential election results
Year	Democratic	Republican	Third parties	Total Votes	Margin
2020	66.70% 14,503	30.78% 6,693	2.52% 547	21,743	35.92%
2016	59.43% 11,222	34.54% 6,522	6.04% 1,140	18,884	24.89%
2012	50.11% 9,401	48.49% 9,096	1.40% 263	18,760	1.63%
2008	55.64% 10,177	42.63% 7,798	1.73% 316	18,291	13.01%
2004	53.02% 9,205	45.54% 7,907	1.45% 251	17,363	7.48%
2000	48.08% 7,899	44.57% 7,323	7.35% 1,207	16,429	3.51%
1996	49.90% 7,906	41.68% 6,604	8.43% 1,335	15,845	8.22%
1992	39.75% 6,649	38.78% 6,487	21.46% 3,590	16,726	0.97%
1988	41.70% 6,416	56.74% 8,730	1.57% 241	15,387	15.04%
1984	38.18% 5,479	61.42% 8,814	0.40% 58	14,351	23.24%
1980	29.48% 4,028	52.13% 7,122	18.39% 2,513	13,663	22.65%
1976	41.73% 5,464	55.09% 7,214	3.18% 417	13,095	13.36%
1972	41.09% 4,955	58.49% 7,054	0.42% 51	12,060	17.40%
1968	44.89% 4,726	51.90% 5,464	3.21% 338	10,528	7.01%
1964	56.61% 5,493	43.06% 4,179	0.33% 32	9,704	13.54%
1960	38.63% 3,582	61.31% 5,685	0.06% 6	9,273	22.68%
1956	22.81% 1,910	77.07% 6,453	0.12% 10	8,373	54.26%
1952	25.70% 1,945	74.08% 5,606	0.21% 16	7,567	48.38%
1948	32.41% 2,037	66.04% 4,151	1.56% 98	6,286	33.63%
1944	34.07% 2,027	65.69% 3,908	0.24% 14	5,949	31.62%
1940	36.31% 2,206	63.34% 3,848	0.35% 21	6,075	27.03%

== Education ==
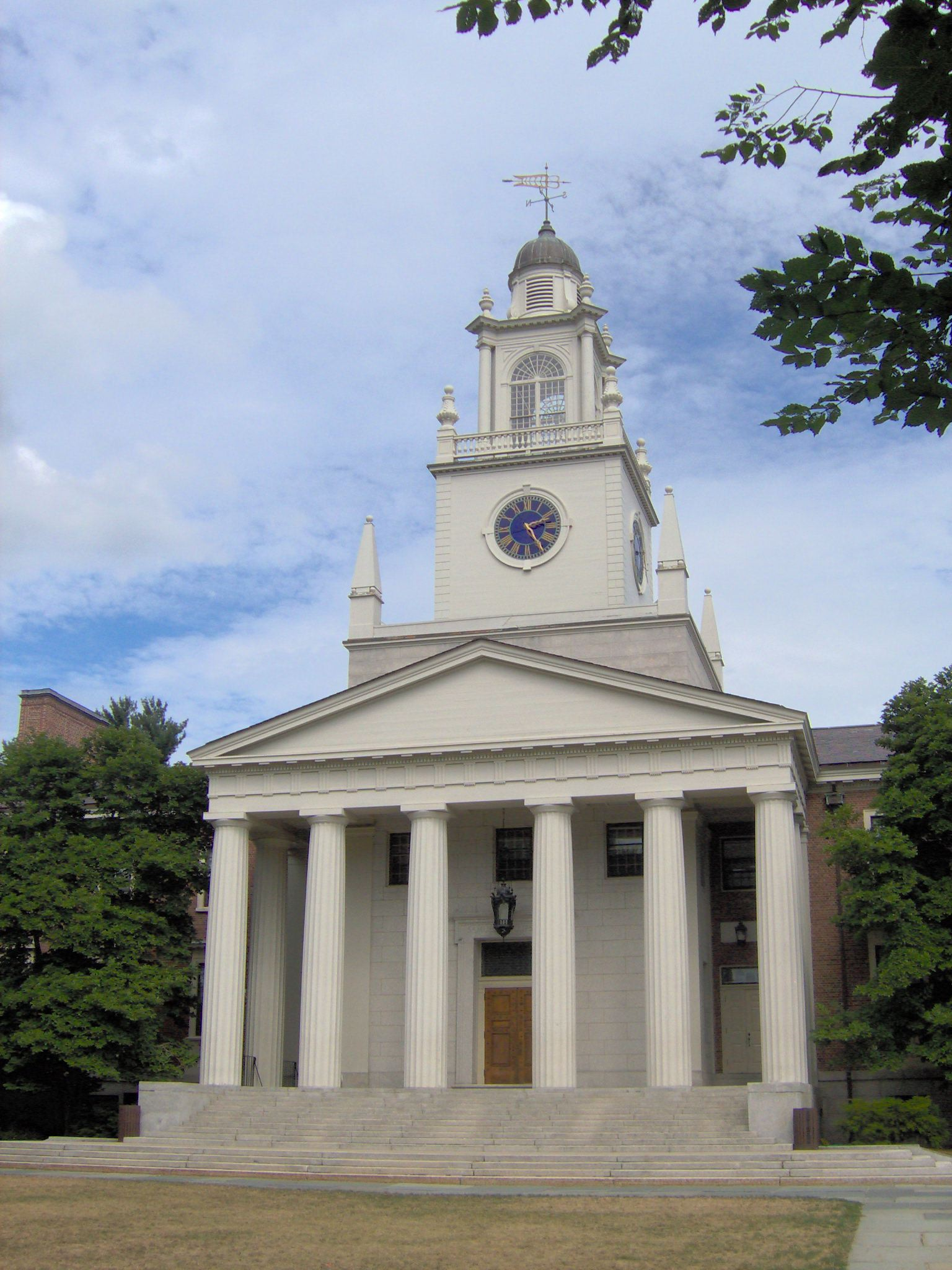
Samuel Phillips Hall, the social science and language building of Phillips Academy

=== Public schools ===
- Preschools – Shawsheen Preschool Program
- Elementary Schools (K–5): Bancroft, West Elementary, South, Sanborn, High Plain
- Middle Schools (6–8): Doherty, West Middle, Wood Hill
- High Schools (9–12): Andover High School
- Greater Lawrence Technical School, serves grades 9–12

=== Private schools ===
- Saint Augustine's Catholic School, serves grades K–8
- The Pike School, serves grades Pre-K–9
- Phillips Academy, serves grades 9–12 (Post-Grad)
- Andover School of Montessori

=== Higher education ===
- Massachusetts School of Law

== Infrastructure ==
=== Transportation ===
Andover is the location of the intersection of Interstate 93 and Interstate 495. The town is also served by Route 28, which serves as the main road from north to south through town, as well as Route 133 and Route 125, a bypass road going through the woods of eastern Andover.

Andover has two stops, Ballardvale and Andover along the Haverhill/Reading Line of the MBTA Commuter Rail, providing rail service from Haverhill to Boston's North Station. Andover Station is also near the Third Railroad Station, a former Boston and Maine Railroad station which is listed on the National Register of Historic Places. The nearest small plane service is at Lawrence Municipal Airport in North Andover, and national service can be found at both Logan International Airport and Manchester–Boston Regional Airport, both within thirty miles of the town. Several routes of the Merrimack Valley Regional Transit Authority and Route 10 on Lowell Regional Transit Authority also service the town. These include both service to Lawrence as well as a weekday commuter bus to Boston.

=== Public safety ===
The Andover Police Department provides full-time general law enforcement for the town. The town is also served by Troop A of the Massachusetts State Police, operating out of the Andover barracks (A-1).

Andover Fire-Rescue provides full-time fire and emergency medical services for Andover. The department has three full-time stations and maintains four engines, two ladder trucks, four ambulances and two forest fire units, as well as miscellaneous vehicles.

== Notable people ==
- Abiel Abbot, (1770–1828), Massachusetts clergyman and author
- Robert Abisi, DJ Lost Kings
- Benjamin Abbot, teacher at Phillips Academy
- Amos Abbott, United States Congressman from Massachusetts
- John Adams, teacher at Phillips Academy from 1810 through 1832
- Ed Anuff, entrepreneur and author
- Harriette Newell Woods Baker, author, over 200 short stories
- Anne Bradstreet, 17th-century poet
- Lorraine Broderick, Emmy-award winning writer
- Bill Buckner, former Red Sox first baseman
- Steven T. Byington, American individualist anarchist
- Sumner Carruth, Civil War officer
- Michael Casey, poet
- Michael Chiklis, actor, The Shield
- Andrew Coburn, author
- Asa Cummings, minister and author
- Bill Cunliffe, Grammy Award winning composer, arranger, jazz pianist
- S.E. Cupp, television host, political commentator, and writer
- Ed Doherty, football coach
- Annalisa Drew, freestyle skier and Olympic athlete at the 2014 and 2018 Winter Olympics
- Barry Finegold, member of the Mass. House of Representatives (served 1996–2007)
- Dudley Fitts, educator, critic, poet and translator
- Abiel Foster, clergyman and United States Congressman from New Hampshire
- Chelsea Frei, actress
- Joseph Frye, brigadier general in the Continental Army
- Ryan Hanigan, former Boston Red Sox catcher
- Kara Hayward, teen actress best known for the movie Moonrise Kingdom
- Jon B. Higgins, Carnatic and Jazz musician
- Jeremiah Ingalls, early American folk composer
- Martin Johnson, lead vocalist and guitarist for band Boys Like Girls
- Dan Koh, former Deputy Assistant to the President and Deputy Director of the White House Office of Intergovernmental Affairs
- Howard Koh, former United States Assistant Secretary for Health for the U.S. Department of Health and Human Services
- Priscilla Lane, actress, Arsenic and Old Lace
- Jonathan Leavitt, founder, early New York City publishing house
- Jay Leno, entertainer, The Tonight Show
- Jim Loscutoff, former Boston Celtics player
- Raphe Malik, American jazz trumpeter
- Martha Carrier, Accused Salem witch
- Michael Maren, film director and former journalist
- Mary McGarry Morris, prize-winning author
- Jimmy McLane, Olympic swimmer
- Paul Monette, prize-winning author
- Marcus Morton, Chief Justice (1882–1890) of the Massachusetts Supreme Judicial Court
- Mike Mullen, United States Navy Admiral
- Bill O'Brien, NFL coach
- Samuel Osgood, United States Postmaster General under President George Washington
- Betty Ong, American Airlines Flight 11 flight attendant killed on September 11, 2001 who informed ground authorities of the initial September 11, 2001, hijackings
- E. J. Perry, Boston College and Brown quarterback
- Samuel Phillips (1690–1771), first pastor of the South Church in Andover
- Salem Poor, freed slave of Andover and Revolutionary War soldier
- Jenny Powers, actress on Broadway; granddaughter of JFK confidant and aide Dave Powers
- Jim Rice, former left fielder for the Boston Red Sox and member of the Hall of Fame
- Blanchard Ryan, actress, Open Water
- John Smith, mill owner and abolitionist
- Samuel Francis Smith, wrote America while a student at Andover Theological Seminary
- Harriet Beecher Stowe, author of Uncle Tom's Cabin; buried in Andover
- George L. Street, III, World War II Medal of Honor recipient
- Dan Sullivan, former NFL lineman
- Susan Tucker, recent member of the Mass. House of Representatives and the Mass. Senate
- Robert Urich, actor best known for the TV series "Vega$" and "Spenser for Hire"
- Elizabeth Stuart Phelps Ward, nineteenth-century author
- Mike Yastrzemski, professional baseball outfielder; grandson of Hall of Famer Carl

== See also ==
- Ballardvale, Massachusetts
- List of municipalities in Massachusetts
- Feaster Five Road Race, an annual Thanksgiving race in Andover
- Andover, Kansas
- Andover, Hampshire, a town in England

== Sources ==
- Farnum, John, Moses Abbott. 1795 Map of Andover.
- Dorman, Moses. 1830 Map of Andover.
- "Andover". Essex-County History and Directory. Boston: C.A. & J.F. Wood. 1870.
- Beers, D.G. 1872 Atlas of Essex County 1872 Map of Andover. Plate 51.Andover Center. Plate 53.Lawrence South Side. Plate 48.
- Bailey, Sarah Loring (1880). Historical Sketches of Andover (Comprising the Present Towns of North Andover and Andover) Massachusetts. Boston: Houghton, Mifflin and Company.
- Walker, George H. 1884 Atlas of Essex County, Massachusetts Map of Andover. Plate 110-111.Frye Village and Ballardville, Andover. Plate 112.Dove Residence Andover. Plate 107.Phillips Academy. Plate 113.
