= ProMedica =

American healthcare system

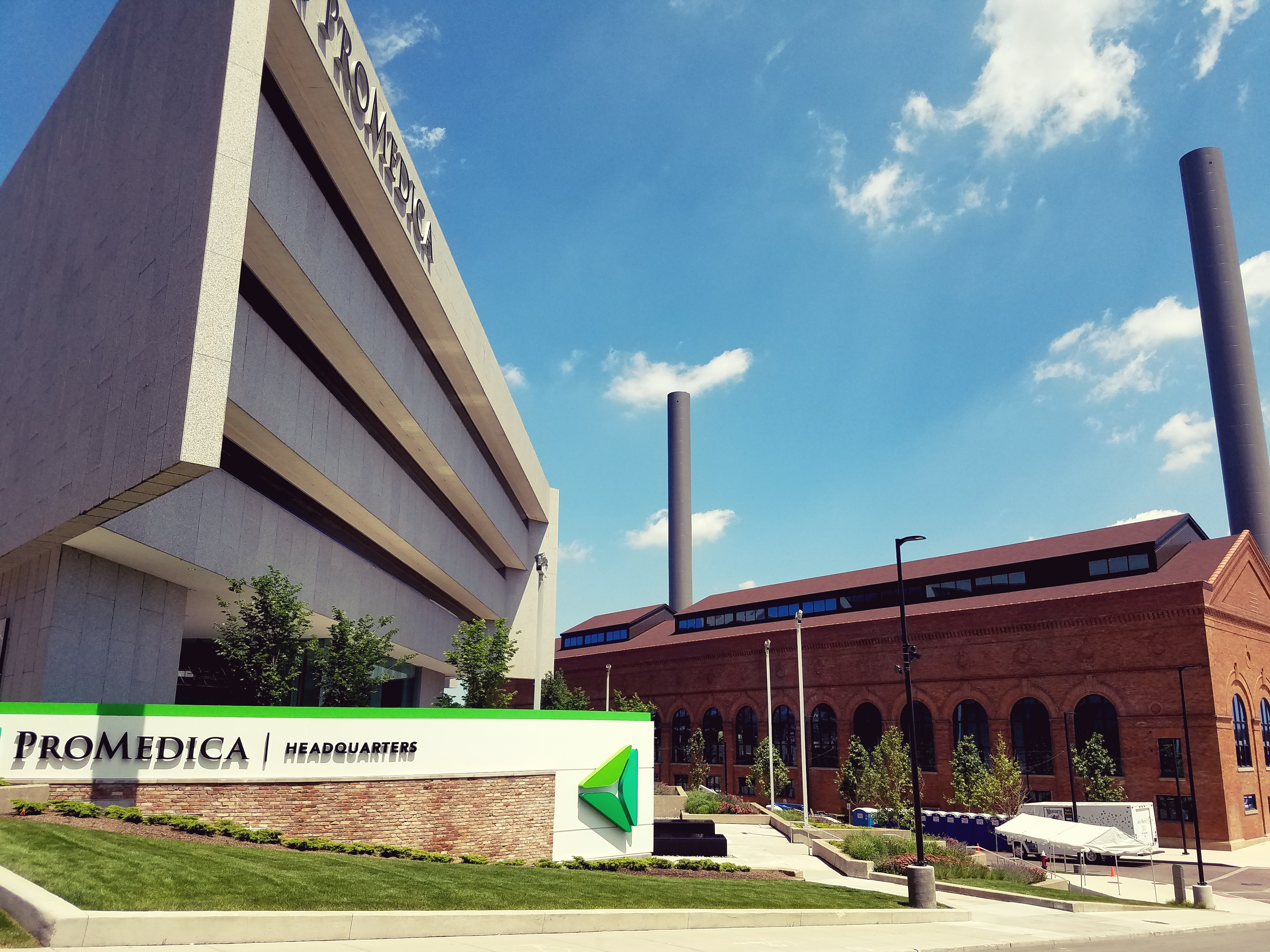
- The downtown headquarters of Promedica
- Established: 1986
- Type: Non-profit
- Headquarters: Toledo, Ohio, United States
- Services: Health care
- Staff: 3,200
- Website: www.promedica.org

ProMedica is a non-profit health care system with locations in northwest Ohio, southeast Michigan, and southern Pennsylvania. The system includes a health education and research center, the health maintenance organization Paramount Health Care, nursing homes, a ground/air ambulance service, a local business network of private practices and several hospitals. About 2,900 ProMedica physicians care for approximately 2 million patients each year.

== History ==
In April 2018, ProMedica announced that it would be pursuing projects in China. Also in April 2018, the company Welltower announced that it would be working with ProMedica to acquire a nursing/assisted living real-estate company called Quality Care Properties.

In September 2025, the Department of Justice announced that it had filed a civil complaint against ProMedica, alleging that several of its nursing facilities provided "grossly substandard" care in violation of the Nursing Home Reform Act.

== Hospitals ==
The company was established in Toledo, Ohio with The Toledo Hospital, and Toledo Children's Hospital. Throughout the years, it has expanded to include other hospitals to cover 23 counties in two states. These include:

- Bay Park Community Hospital (Oregon)
- Charles and Virginia Hickman Hospital (Adrian)
- Coldwater Regional Hospital (Coldwater)
- ProMedica Defiance Regional Hospital (Defiance)
- Flower Hospital (Sylvania)
- Fostoria Community Hospital (Fostoria)
- Fremont Memorial Hospital (Fremont)
- Herrick Medical Center (CLOSED) (Tecumseh)
- Lima Memorial Health System (Lima)
- Monroe Regional Hospital (Monroe)
- Wildwood Spine and Orthopedic Surgery Hospital (Toledo)
- ProMedica Toledo Hospital (Toledo)
- Toledo Children's Hospital (Toledo)
