= Chandler-Bigsby-Abbot House =

Historic house in Massachusetts, United States

- U.S. National Register of Historic Places
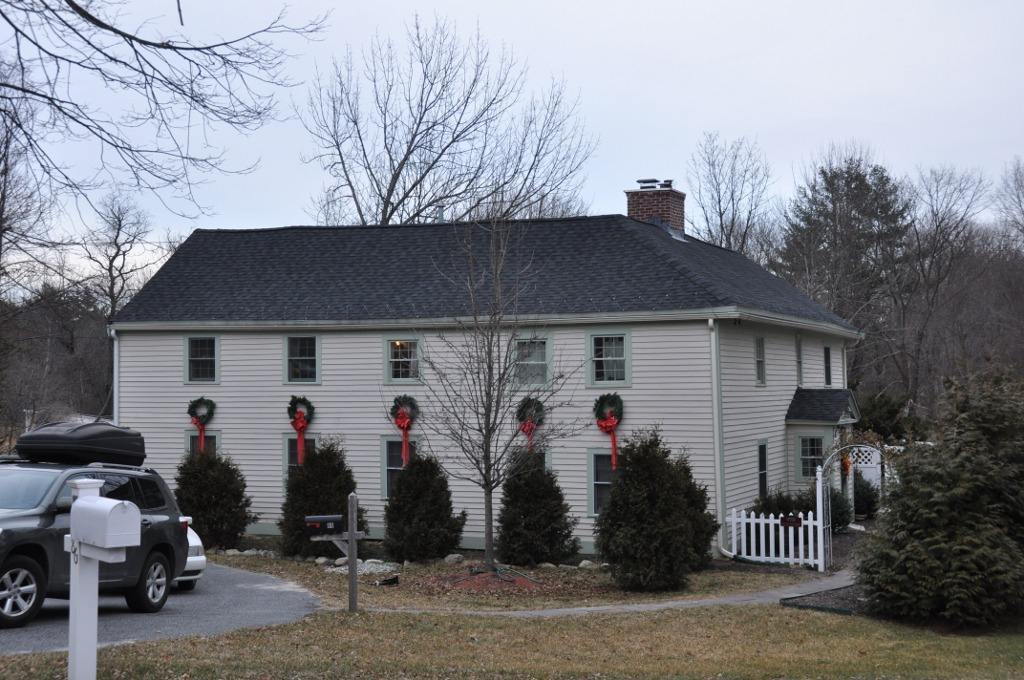

- Location within Massachusetts Location within the United States
- Location: 88 Lowell Street, Andover, Massachusetts
- Coordinates: 42°39′59″N 71°9′25″W
- Built: c.1673
- Architectural style: Georgian
- MPS: Town of Andover MRA
- NRHP reference No.: 82004830
- Added to NRHP: June 10, 1982

Chandler-Bixby-Abbot House (1673) is a historic house in Andover, Massachusetts and is the oldest surviving house in Andover.

== History ==
The house was built before 1673 by Captain Thomas Chandler, a blacksmith who was one of the original proprietors of Andover, as part of his sixty-acre farm. The house was inherited by his daughter Hannah Bigsby (Bixby) upon Chandler's death. The farm house was later remodeled in a Georgian style. The house was added to the National Register of Historic Places in 1982. It is one of the oldest surviving houses in Massachusetts.

== See also ==
- List of the oldest buildings in Massachusetts
- National Register of Historic Places listings in Andover, Massachusetts
- National Register of Historic Places listings in Essex County, Massachusetts
