= Norma Bixby =

American politician (born 1941)

Member of the Montana House of Representatives from the 41st district
- Incumbent
- Assumed office 2000

Personal details
- Born: April 29, 1941 (age 85) Lame Deer, Montana
- Party: Democratic Party
- Spouse: Robert
- Education: Eastern Montana College, New Mexico State University
- Profession: Educator

Norma Bixby (born April 29, 1941) is a Democratic Party member of the Montana House of Representatives, representing District 41 since 2000.
