= Ward Reservation =

Protected area in Massachusetts, US

Coordinates: 42°38′28″N 71°6′21″W

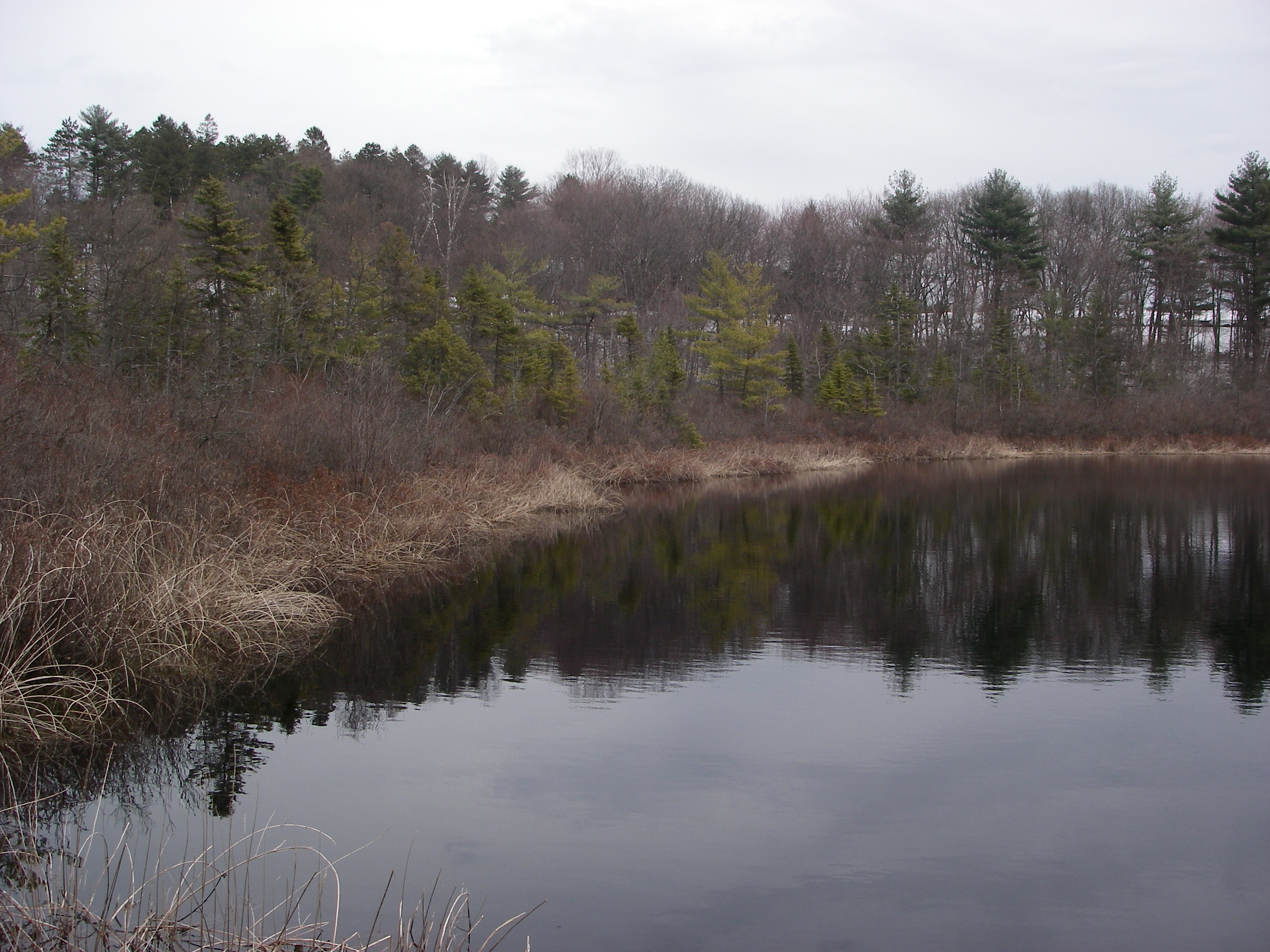
- The Ward Reservation's Pine Hole Bog
- Interactive map of Ward Reservation
- Established: 1940
- Operator: The Trustees of Reservations
- Website: Charles W. Ward Reservation

The Charles W. Ward Reservation is a 704-acre (285 ha) open space reserve located in Andover and North Andover, Massachusetts, 20 miles (32 km) north of Boston. The reserve, managed by the land conservation non-profit organization The Trustees of Reservations, is notable for its open drumlin hilltops and vistas encompassing Boston and Salem. The Ward Reservation offers 13 miles (21 km) of trails and former woods roads available for hiking, horseback riding, mountain biking, and cross country skiing; it is also a link in the 200-mile (320 km) Bay Circuit Trail system.

== Geography and recreation ==
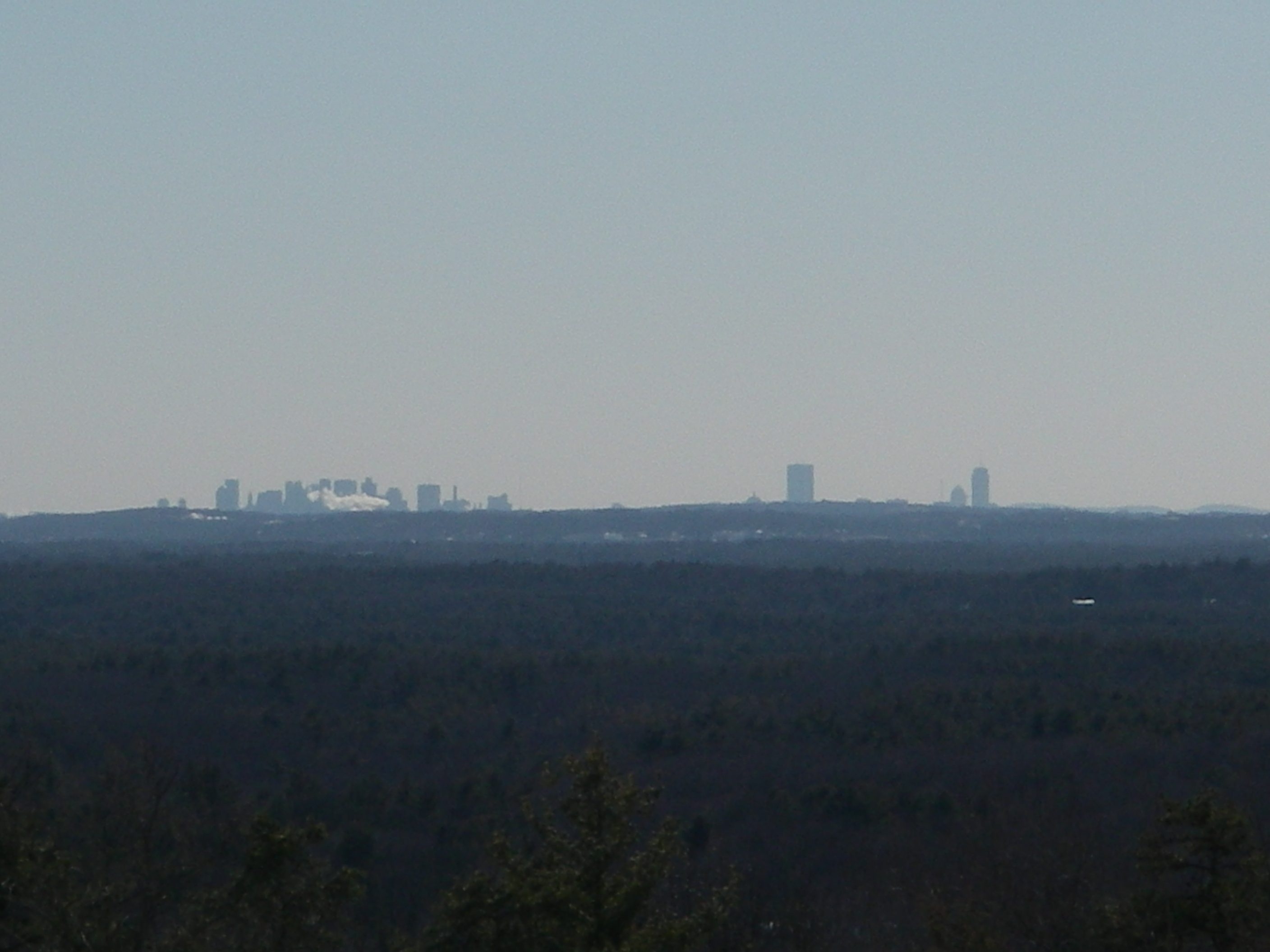
Boston from Holt Hill

The Ward Reservation contains hayfields, hilltops, wetlands, creeks, swamps, and woodlands. Colonial era stone walls on the property, when combined, total more than 17 miles (27 km) long. Hills on the reservation include Shrub Hill, Boston Hill, and the 420-foot (130 m) Holt Hill drumlin, named for the 17th-century settlement of Nicholas Holt, which offers 280 degree views of Boston, Salem, and the Blue Hills. An arrangement of "solstice stones" on the summit mark annual solstice and equinox events. Pine Hole Bog, a rare quaking bog located on the property is accessed via a 700-foot (210 m) boardwalk; The Trustees of Reservations provides an interpretive brochure for the bog at trailhead kiosks.

A network of trails span the Ward Reservation, most notably the Bay Circuit trail which forms a 200-mile (320 km) arc around metropolitan Boston through suburbs west of the city. The trail passes over Holt Hill. A main reservation trailhead and parking area is located on Prospect Road in Andover. There is also access and parking at Brightview on Turnpike Street in North Andover via Boston Hill.

== History ==
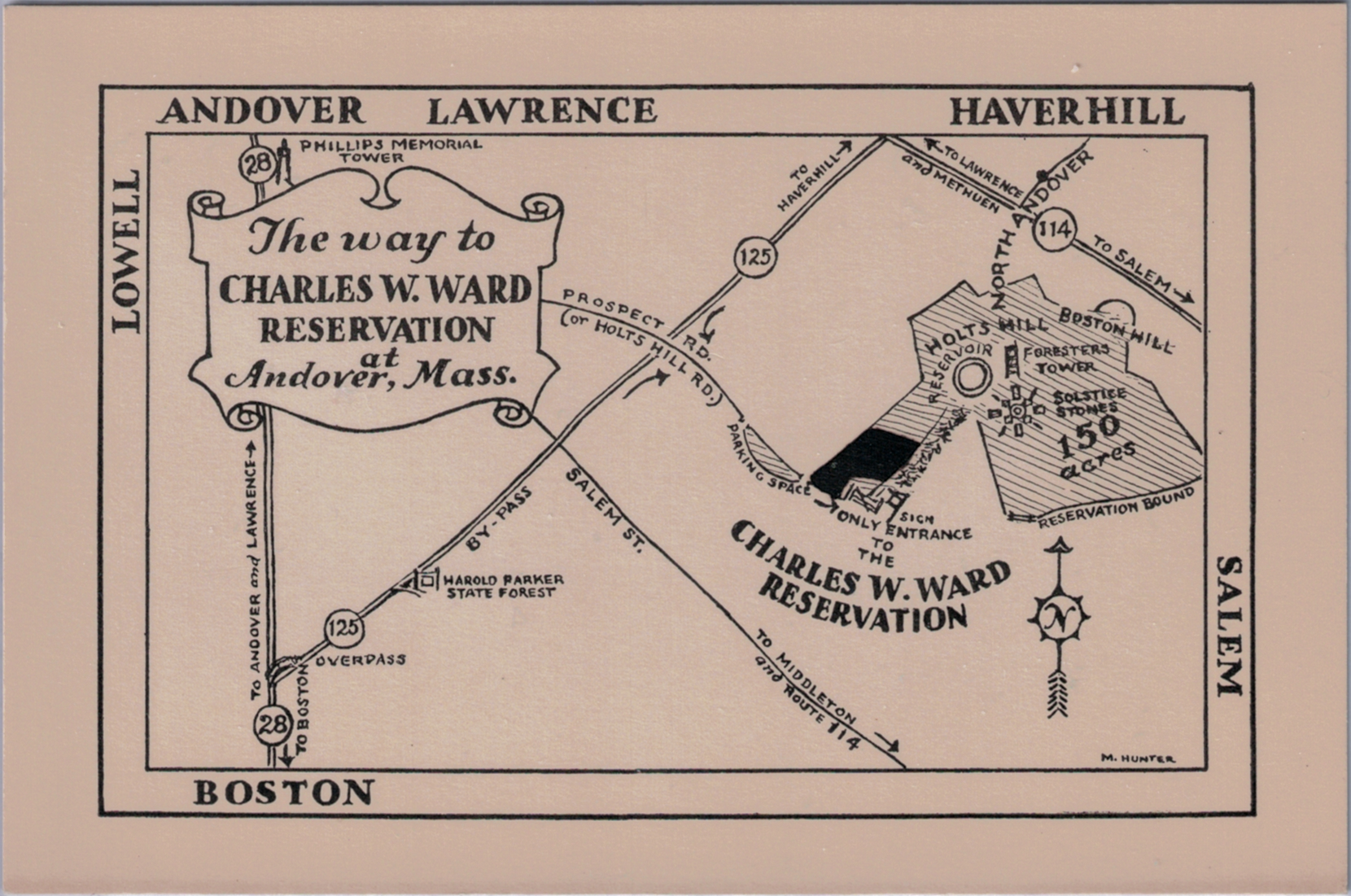
Promotional map drawn by Mabel Brace Ward c.1940

The Ward Reservation's original acreage was donated by Mrs. Charles W. Ward in 1940 in memory of her husband. Additional lands were given by the Ward family and other donors in at least twelve gifts from 1944 to 1999. Other parcels were purchased between 1958 and 1978.

Parts of the reservation, including some parcels it surrounds, are listed on the National Register of Historic Places as the Holt Farm.

A fire tower was built at the top of Holt Hill in 1924. The current tower was built in 1970. It is in active use, but is not open to the public.

Some time in between 2005–2013, the Johnston family sold their inherited land from Grey Road to earlier reservation land. Mary, Chuck, and Joe all sold their land to the reservation, and generously added to the governmental land for a very cheap price. The land was officially sold, and the Johnston root can still be seen in the houses and family ties in Andover.

== Image gallery ==
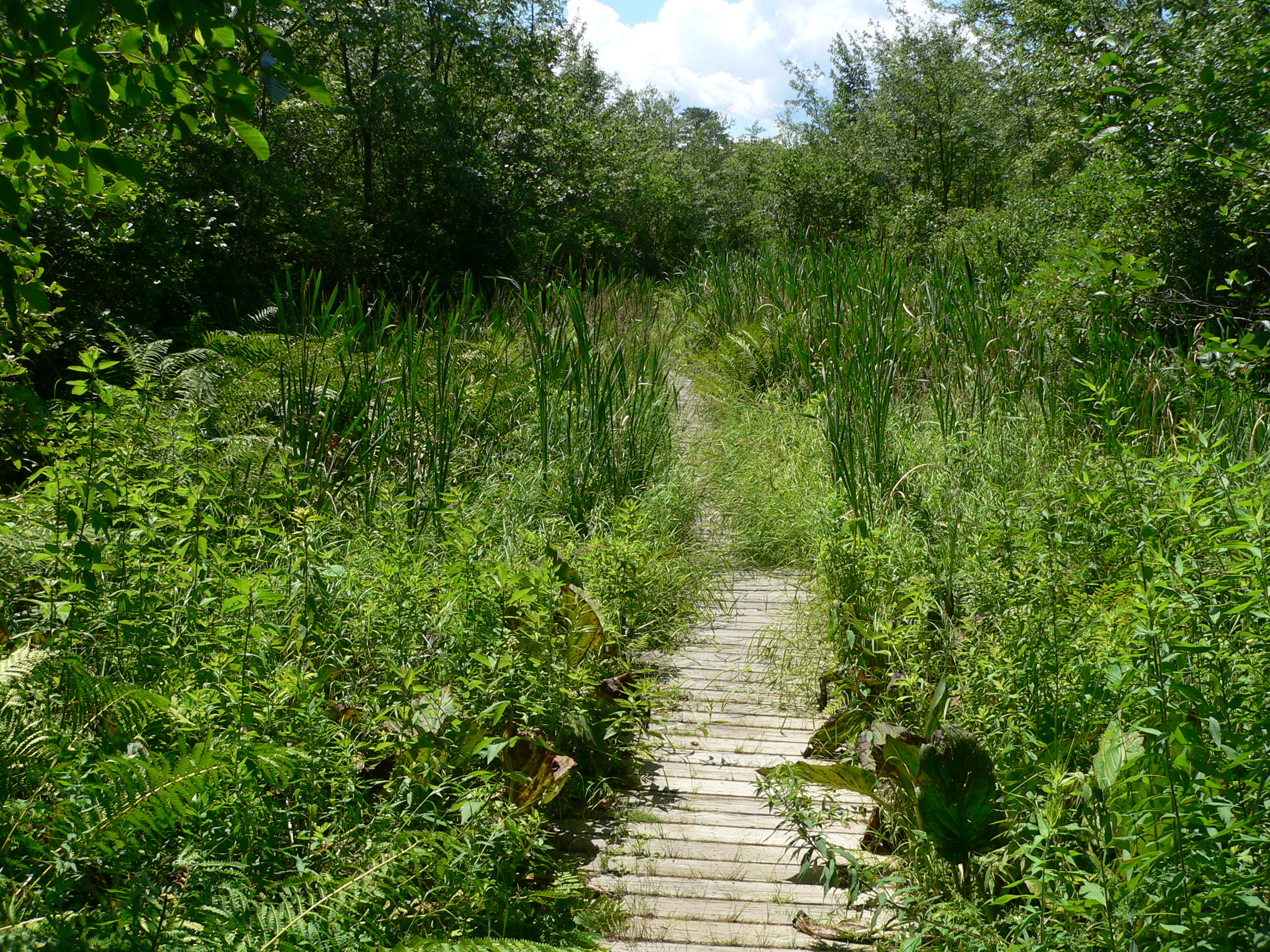
Bog Trail

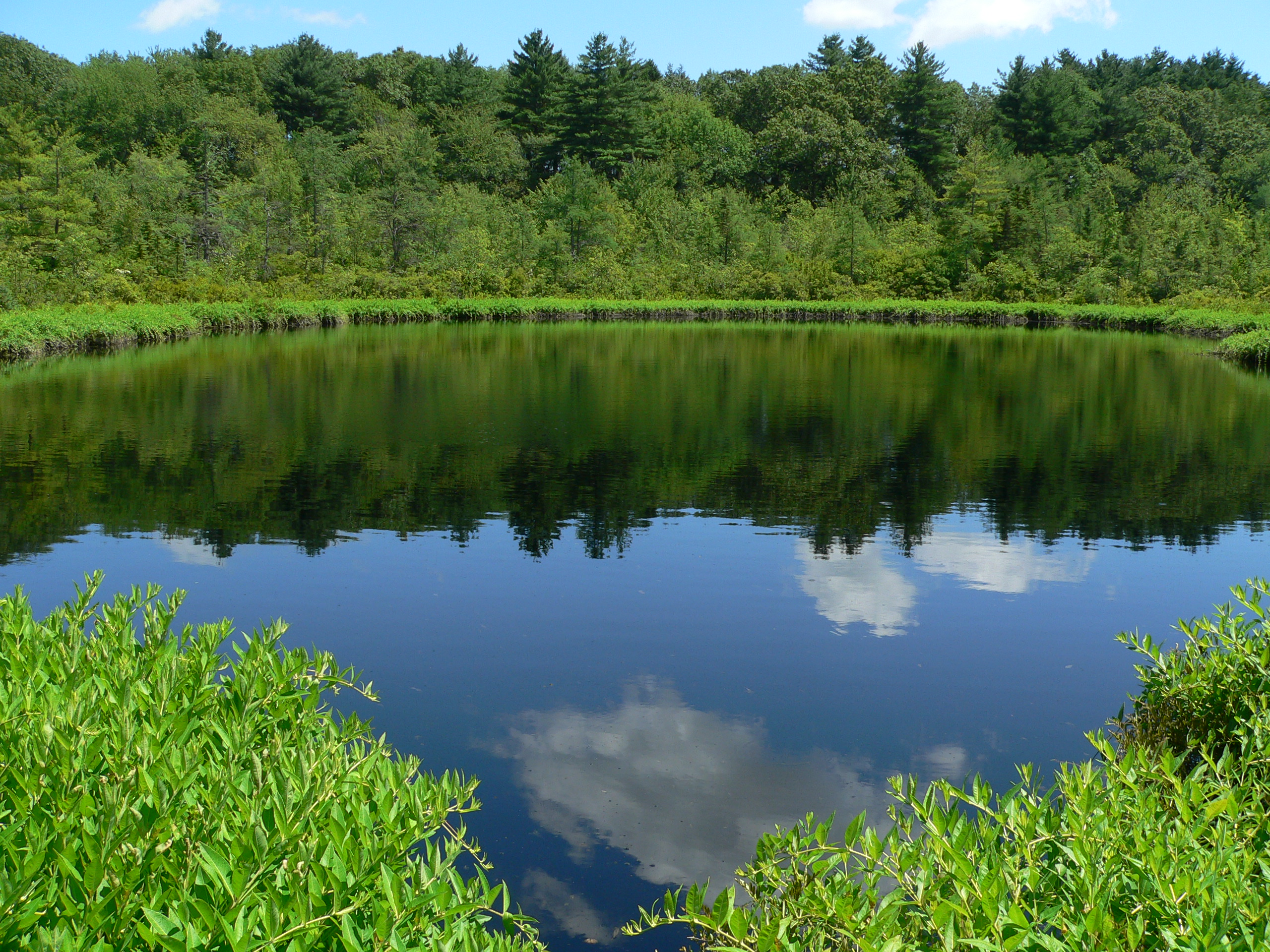
Pine Hole Pond

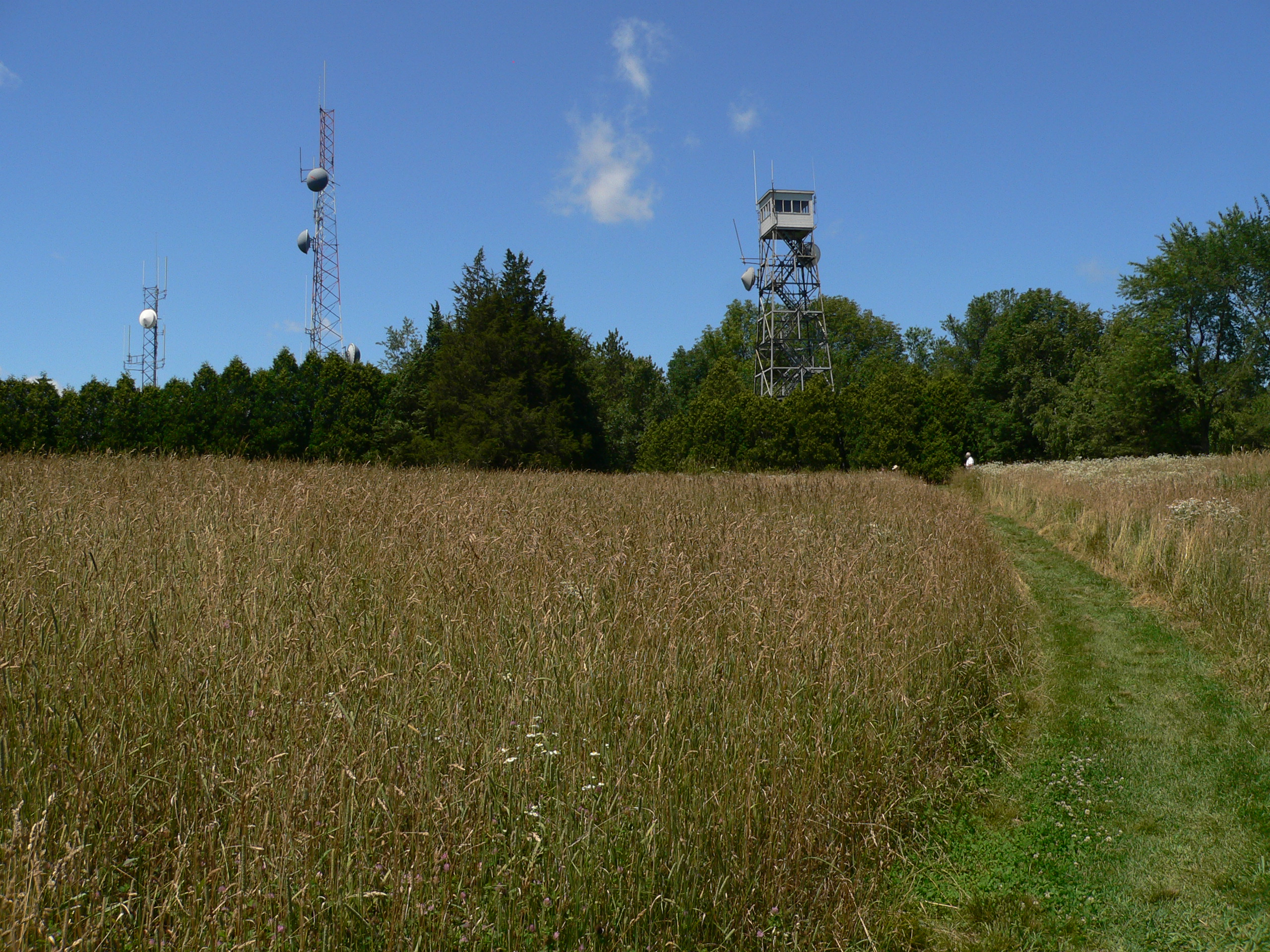
Fire tower on Holt Hill

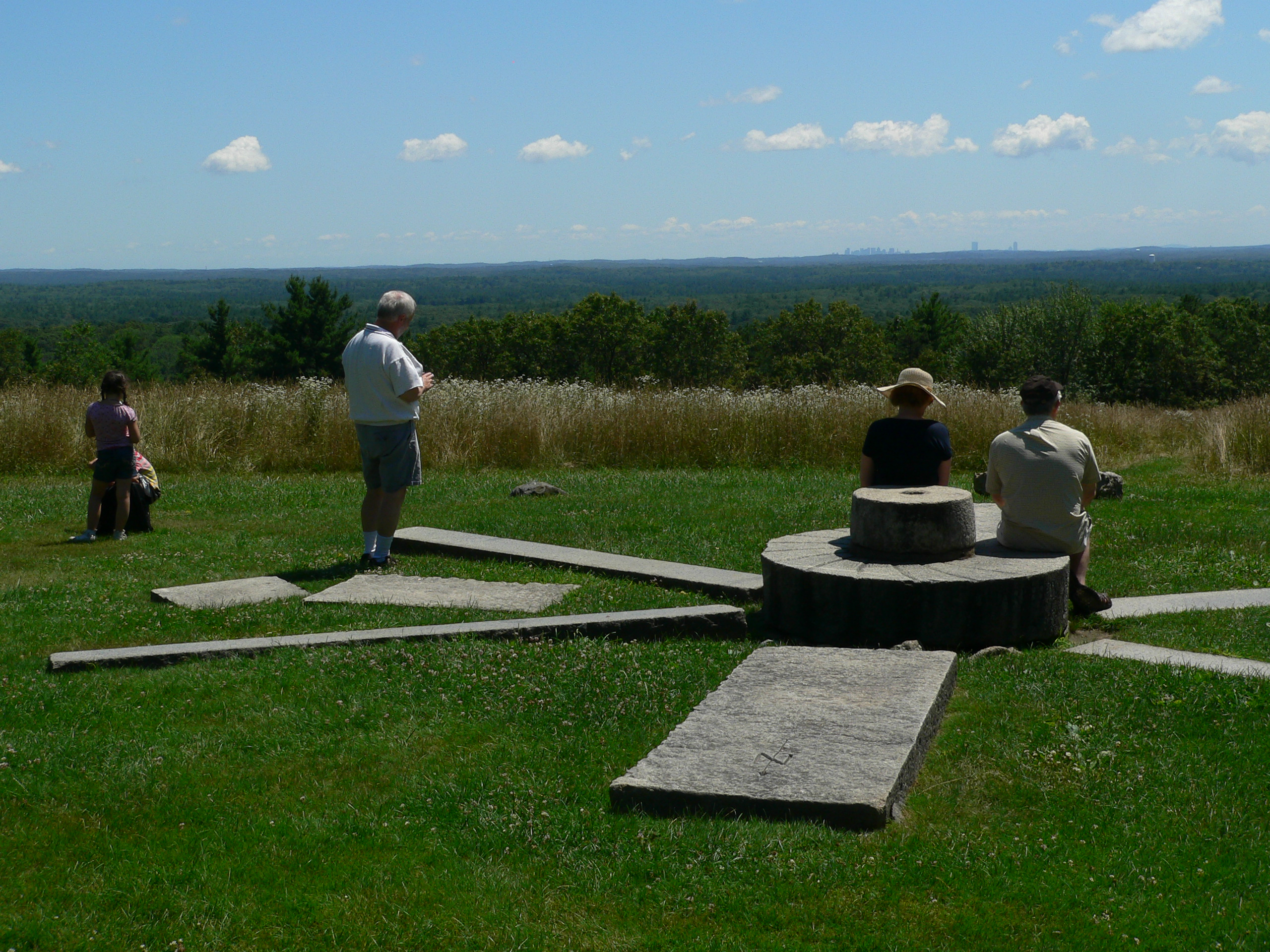
Solstice stones on Holt Hill summit
