= Robert Bigsby =

English antiquarian and author

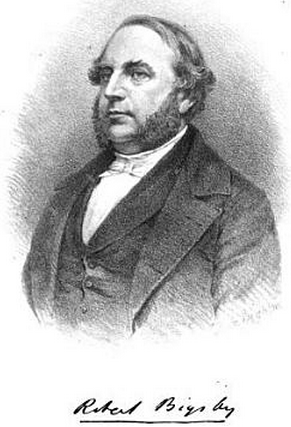
Robert Bigsby

Robert Bigsby FSA (11 April 1806 – 27 September 1873) was an English antiquarian and author.

Bigsby was born in Castle Gate, Nottingham in 1806, son of Robert Bigsby, the registrar of the archdeaconry of Nottingham. His father had visited the United States in 1787 where he had often been the guest of George Washington. He was educated at Repton School during the headmastership of William Boultbee Sleath, and originally intended to become a lawyer. However, he turned to the study of antiquities and in particular to collecting memorabilia of Sir Francis Drake, the famous navigator of the Elizabethan era. He had inherited Drake's astrolabe, and in 1831 he presented the instrument to King William IV, who in turn presented it to Greenwich Hospital. He presented other relics of Drake to the British Museum.

Bigsby was awarded an honorary LLD by the University of Glasgow, became a member of several foreign literary societies, was voted a Fellow of the Society of Antiquaries and in 1837 a Fellow of the Royal Society (although ejected in 1845 for non-payment) and became secretary and registrar of the English "Langue" of the Knights Hospitaller. He was a prolific author, writing poetry and drama but mainly concentrating on antiquarian subjects, publishing sixteen books and many articles in magazines and reviews.

Bigsby was elected a member of the American Antiquarian Society in 1851.

He died on 27 September 1873 at Peckham Rye, aged 67.

== Bibliography ==
- Robert Bigsby (1839). The Triumph of Drake, or the Dawn of England's Naval Power, a Poem.
- Robert Bigsby (1842). Miscellaneous Poems and Essays. Whittaker & Co.
- Robert Bigsby (1848). Visions of the Times of Old, or the Antiquarian Enthusiast.
- Robert Bigsby (1850). Boldon Delaval, a Love Story; My Cousin's Story; The Man on the Grey Horse.
- Robert Bigsby (1850). Dr. Bigsby and the Evangelicals, a Vindication of Boldon Delavel.
- Robert Bigsby (1850). A Supplement to the Rev. Jos. Jones's Appendix to the Vindication of Boldon Deleval.
- Robert Bigsby (1851). Old Places Revisited, or The Antiquarian's Enthusiast. C. Wright.
- Robert Bigsby (1853). Scraps from my Note-Book, or Gleanings of Curious Facts connected with the Family - History of D-shire.
- Robert Bigsby (1853). Ombo, a Dramatic Romance in twelve acts, with an historical introduction and notes.
- Robert Bigsby (1854). Historical and Topographical Description of Repton, in the County of Derby. Woodfall and Kinder.
- Robert Bigsby. Remarks on the Expediency of founding a National Institution of Literature.
- Robert Bigsby (1864). Irminsula, or the Great Pillar, a mythological research.
- Robert Bigsby (1866). A Tribute to the Memory of Scanderbeg the Great.
- Robert Bigsby (1867). National Honours and their Noblest Claimants.
- Robert Bigsby (1869). Memoir of the Order of St John of Jerusalem from the Capitulation of Malta till 1798.
- Rev. Samuel Fox (1872). Robert Bigsby (ed.). History and Antiquities of the Parish Church of St. Matthew, Morley, in the County of Derby.
