= ProMedica Toledo Hospital =

- ProMedica Health System
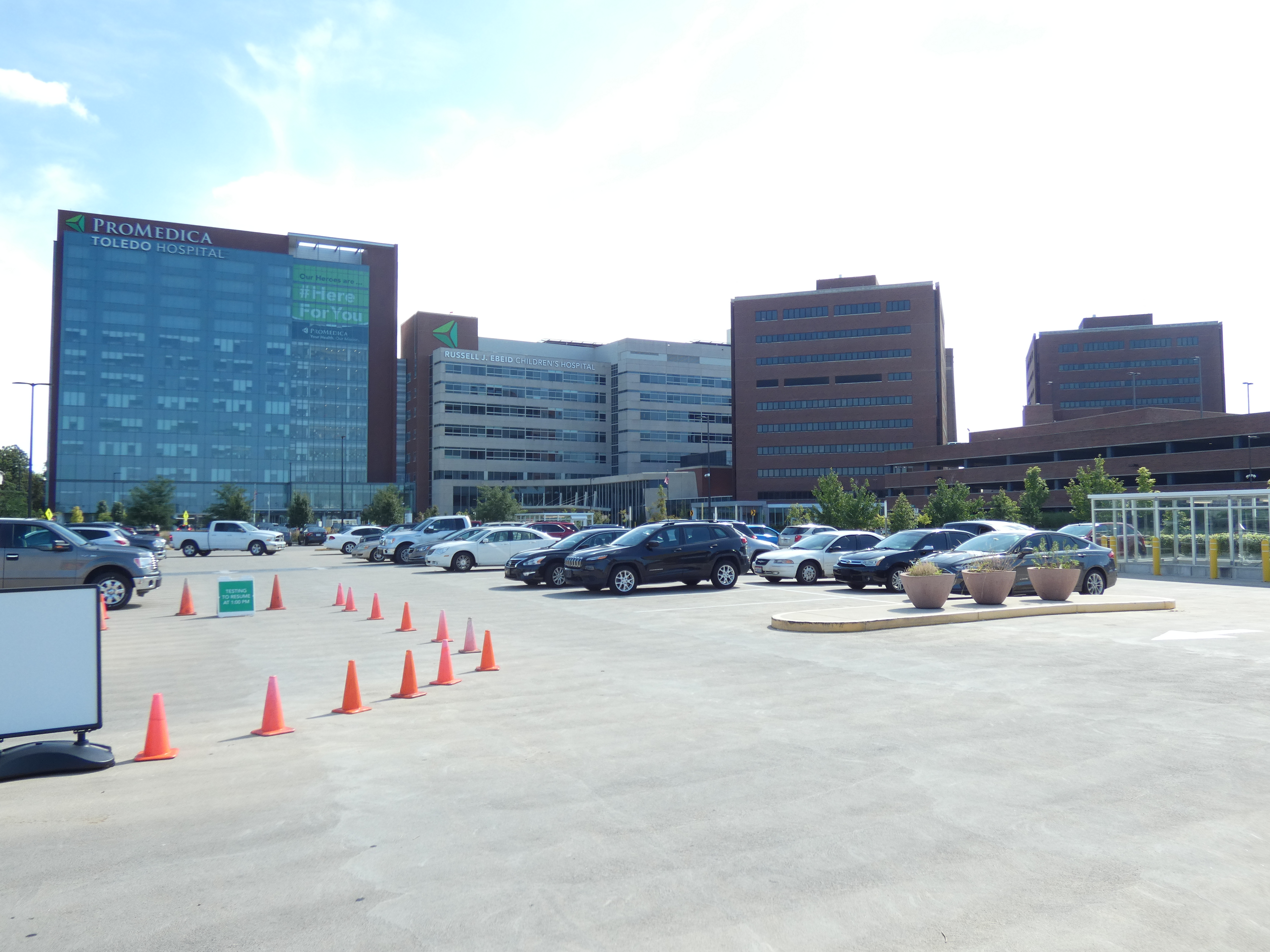
- Hospital's main campus

Geography
- Location: 2142 North Cove Boulevard, Toledo, Ohio, United States
- Coordinates: 41°40′27″N 83°35′43″W

Organization
- Type: Teaching Hospital; Academic Medical Center
- Affiliated university: University of Toledo College of Medicine & Life Sciences

Services
- Emergency department: Level I trauma center Level II Pediatric Trauma Center
- Beds: 794 adult beds 151 pediatric beds (Russell J Ebeid Children's Hospital)

Helipads
- Helipad: Metro Life Flight; ICAO: 6OI6

History
- Founded: 1874

Links
- Website: https://www.promedica.org/toledo-hospital/pages/default.aspx
- Lists: Hospitals in Ohio

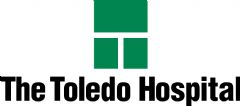
The Toledo Hospital logo, before acquisition by ProMedica

ProMedica Toledo Hospital, originally known as Toledo Hospital, is a 794-bed non-profit hospital in Toledo, Ohio operated by ProMedica. The hospital is a Level I trauma center and the largest acute care hospital in the Toledo metropolitan area with at least 4,800 health care professionals, including more than 1,000 specialty and primary care physicians, making it the region's largest employer.

The hospital's Toledo campus includes ProMedica Russell J. Ebeid Children's Hospital, a Level II pediatric trauma center with 151 beds, including a 72-bed newborn intensive care unit.

Divisions of ProMedica Toledo Hospital include ProMedica Flower Hospital in Sylvania and ProMedica Wildwood Orthopaedic and Spine Hospital in Sylvania Township.

In 2015, the University of Toledo entered into a 50-year agreement with ProMedica to affiliate the school's University of Toledo College of Medicine and Life Sciences with the hospital.

== Amenities ==
The hospital has a cafeteria, one gift shop, internet access, a library, and pastoral services.

There is also a renovation project currently taking place, which will result in the hospital containing a specific heart hospital.

== Russell J. Ebeid Children's Hospital ==
The Toledo campus includes the ProMedica Russell J. Ebeid Children's Hospital, formerly the ProMedica Toledo Children's Hospital. In 2006, 4,856 patients were under the care of Toledo Children's Hospital. The children's hospital treated 26,469 emergencies and performed almost 2000 surgeries the same year.
