= ProMedica Flower Hospital =

Coordinates: 41°42′32″N 83°41′28″W

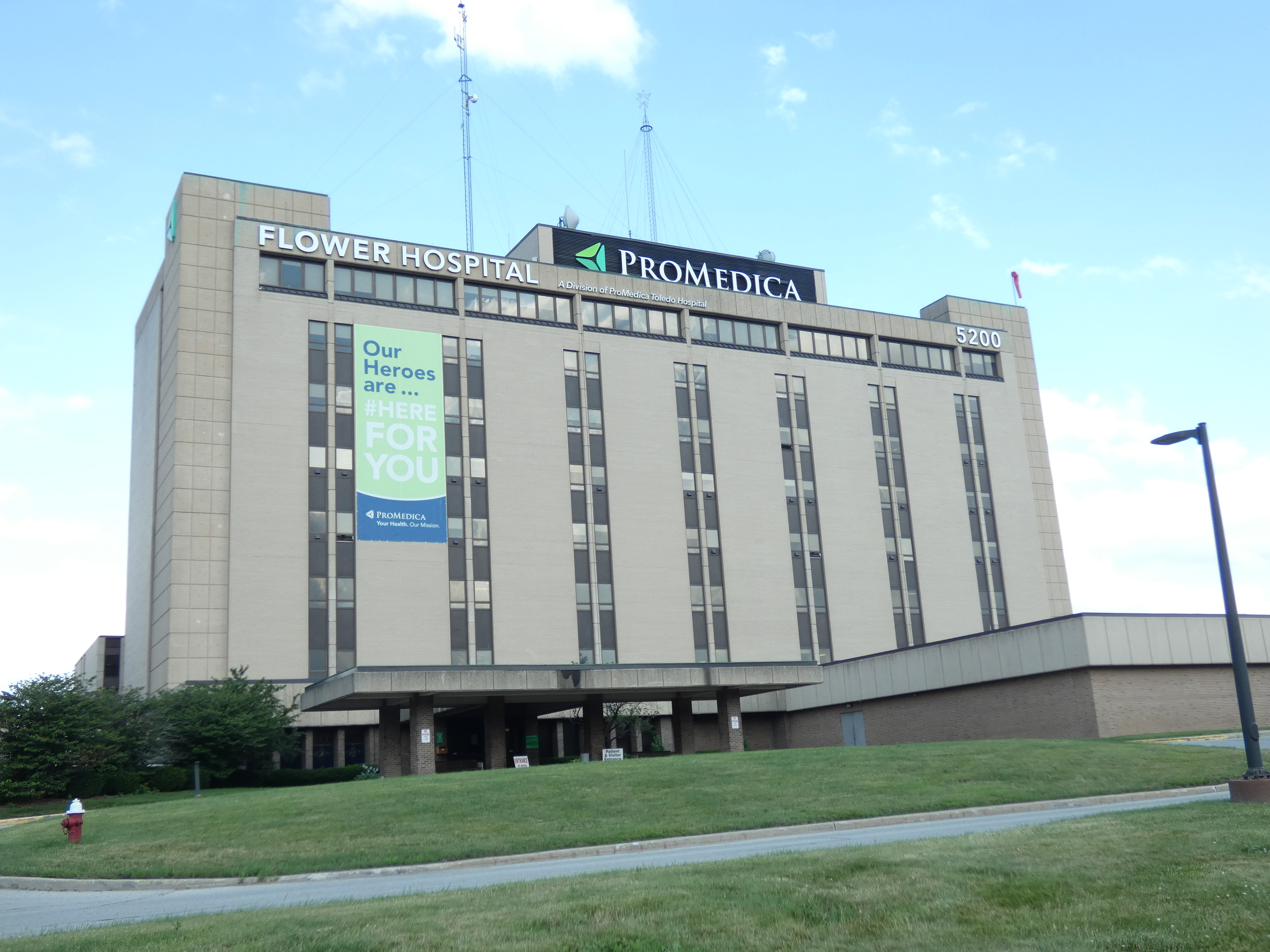
- Hospital's main building

Geography
- Location: 5200 Harroun Road, Sylvania, Ohio, USA

Organisation
- Care system: Non-profit
- Affiliated university: none

Services
- Beds: 311

History
- Opened: 1910

Links
- Website: promedica.org/flower-hospital
- Lists: Hospitals in Ohio

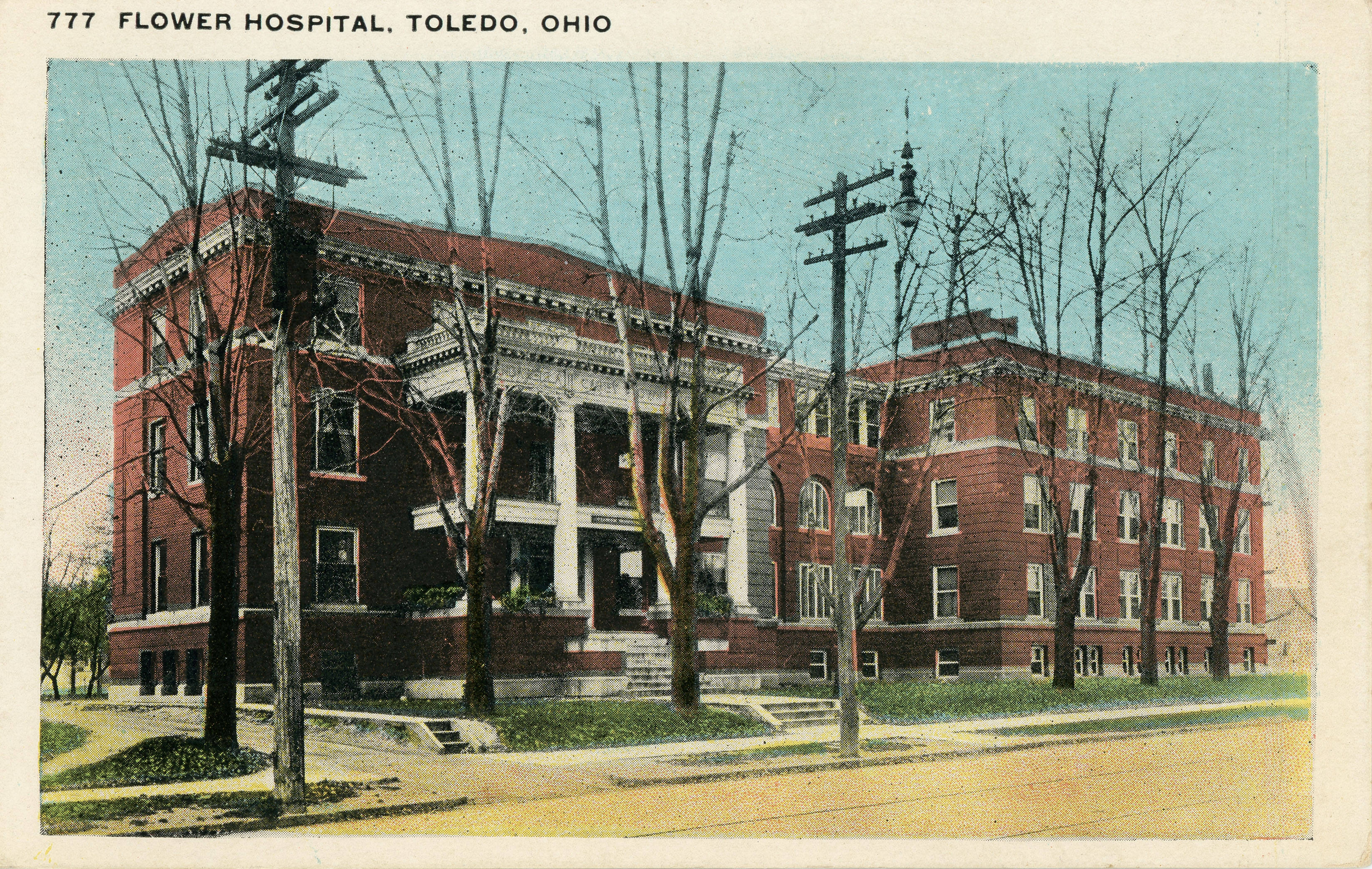
The original Flower Hospital in Toledo, Ohio, 1910s

ProMedica Flower Hospital is 311-bed non-profit hospital in Sylvania, Ohio, United States, operated by ProMedica as a division of ProMedica Toledo Hospital.

The hospital is home to the Hickman Cancer Center, an emergency department, primary stroke center, and adult inpatient psychiatry services. The emergency department has 25 beds and serves approximately 30,000 patients each year.

== History ==
In memory of his late wife, Ellen, Stevens Warren Flower took up the task of building Flower Hospital in 1910. It was originally built near his home in downtown Toledo, Ohio, but it was later relocated to Sylvania, Ohio, in 1975.

== Amenities ==
The hospital has a cafeteria, a Subway, two gift shops, internet access, a library, and pastoral services.
