= Orlando (Andover, Massachusetts) =

Historic house in Massachusetts, United States

- U.S. National Register of Historic Places
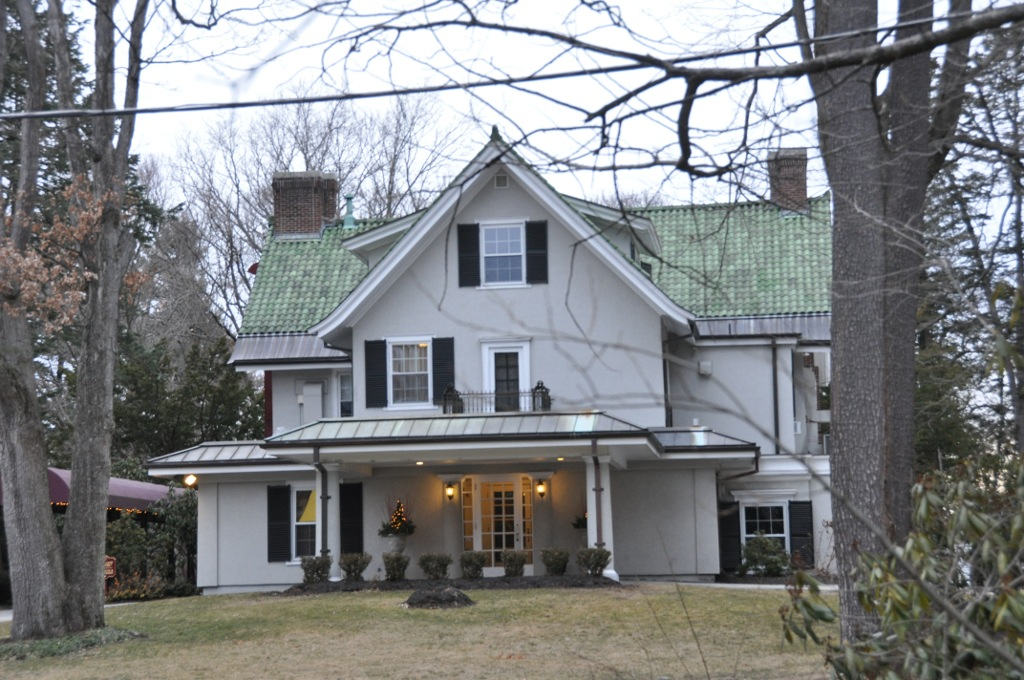

- Location within Massachusetts Location within the United States
- Location: Andover, Massachusetts
- Coordinates: 42°40′2″N 71°8′59″W
- Built: 1916-17
- Architect: Perley F. Gilbert
- Architectural style: Spanish Colonial Revival
- MPS: Town of Andover MRA
- NRHP reference No.: 82004815
- Added to NRHP: June 10, 1982

Orlando is the historic estate of William M. Wood Jr. in Andover, Massachusetts.

== History and architecture ==
Wood's father, William Madison Wood, was president and part owner of the American Woolen Company, whose home was the Arden estate next door to where Orlando was built. William M. Wood Jr.'s mother was Ellen Ayer Wood, the daughter of Frederick Ayer. Orlando is a distinctive Spanish Mission style mansion of 2.5 stories, with a green tile roof. The house was a wedding gift to Wood and his new wife, Edith Goldsborough Robinson, from his parents. The house was begun in 1916 and completed in 1917 to a design by architect Perley F. Gilbert, an Andover native who was then practicing in Lowell. The house's locally unusual Spanish Colonial-inspired architecture may have been influenced by the Wood family's summers in Florida.

Located at 260 N. Main Street, the house now houses the private Lanam Club.

The house was listed on the National Register of Historic Places in 1982.

== Architect ==
The architect, Perley Fred Gilbert (December 14, 1868 – May 5, 1956), practiced architecture in Lowell from 1899 until his death. He graduated from the Massachusetts Institute of Technology in 1895 and began practice as the partner, then successor, of Otis A. Merrill, Lowell's leading architect. He specialized in the design of homes but was responsible for other buildings including the Masonic Temple (1929) in Lowell and the Memorial Auditorium (1936, with Kilham, Hopkins & Greeley) in Andover. After his death his firm continued as Perley F. Gilbert Associates; their works included the Kenneth R. Fox Student Union (1973), Lowell's tallest building.

== See also ==
- National Register of Historic Places listings in Andover, Massachusetts
- National Register of Historic Places listings in Essex County, Massachusetts
