= Arden (Andover, Massachusetts) =

Historic house in Massachusetts, United States

- U.S. National Register of Historic Places
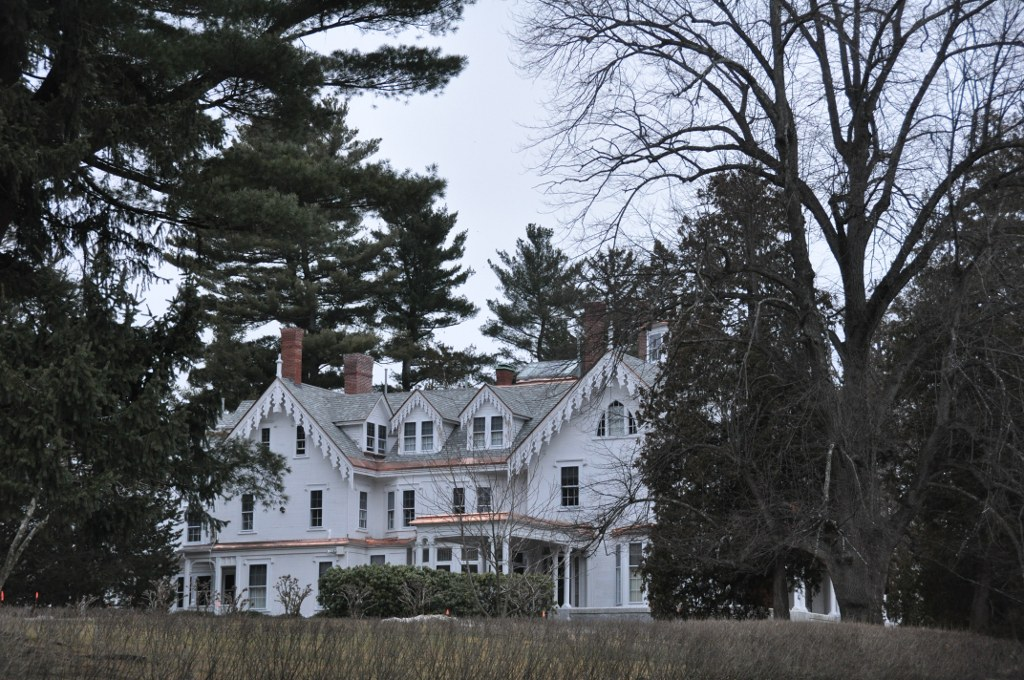

- Location within Massachusetts Location within the United States
- Location: Andover, Massachusetts
- Coordinates: 42°40′5″N 71°8′57″W
- Built: 1845
- Architect: Chickering, Jacob
- Architectural style: Gothic Revival
- MPS: Town of Andover MRA
- NRHP reference No.: 82004812
- Added to NRHP: June 10, 1982

Arden is a historic estate at 276 N. Main Street in Andover, Massachusetts, United States. It was the home of two of Andover's most important mill owners, John Dove and William Madison Wood (the latter being the founder of the American Woolen Company).

== History ==
The site where Arden was built was originally occupied by the c. 1678 Josiah Barnard House, which was described in 1829 as one of the nicest houses of its time. This house was torn down in 1846 to make way for the construction of Arden. It was built for John Dove, a Scottish immigrant who established the first flax mill in Andover with Peter Smith and established Smith & Dove Co. with Peter Smith and his brother, John. The builder was Jacob Chickering, a leading local builder, who may have had design guidance for Theodore Voelkers. Dove's family held the property until 1891.

The buyer of the house was William Wood, who went on to found the American Woolen Company, and to develop the planned community of Shawsheen Village to the north. The estate is still in the hands of Wood's descendants. It was listed on the National Register of Historic Places in 1982.

== Description ==
The 2 1/2-story wood-frame house is built with elaborate Gothic Revival style decorations. The gable ends are decorated with bargeboard molding, and the porches are supported by elaborate groupings of columns. The house also has a particularly elaborate port cochere.

== See also ==
- National Register of Historic Places listings in Andover, Massachusetts
- National Register of Historic Places listings in Essex County, Massachusetts
