= John Smith (abolitionist) =

19th century mill-owner and abolitionist

John Smith (1797-1886) was a 19th-century industrialist in Andover, Massachusetts, whose Smith & Dove Co. mill employed up to 300 people spinning twine and thread from flax. Smith was also a philanthropist who inspired the building of the town's Memorial Hall Library and an abolitionist who co-founded the Free Christian Church on the principle of freedom for all people.

== History ==
Smith was born in Brechin, Scotland in 1797. At age 8, following his father's death, he began to work on farms and in flax mills to support his family.

Smith emigrated to the United States via Halifax, Nova Scotia, arriving on Dec. 15, 1816. He worked as a machinist in Watertown and Medway before starting his own business, John Smith & Co., in Plymouth. He later asked his brother, Peter, to join him in America.

Smith and his business partners, Joseph Faulkner and Warren Richardson, moved their company to Andover in 1824. They built a mill on the east side of the Shawsheen River where they made machinery for the cotton industry. After Faulkner and Richardson died in 1829, Smith went into business with his brother, Peter, and his brother's friend, John Dove.

Smith purchased a farm and home on North Main Street formerly owned by Capt. Reuben Frye. The home dated to 1796. Smith remodeled, building a “fine mansion house” with piazzas and other architectural features favored by the wealthy. The home, subsequently named Shawsheen Manor, was demolished in 1988.

Smith died on Feb. 25, 1886, at age 89.

John Smith and his brother, Peter, are buried in the West Parish Garden Cemetery in Andover.

== Smith & Dove Co. ==
John Smith's brother, Peter, and John Dove started a business to spin flax while making the machinery used in the spinning process. Later joined by John Smith, their company's first mill was in Andover's Frye Village (later Shawsheen Village) until moving up the Shawsheen River into the former Abbot Mill in 1843. The business incorporated as Smith & Dove Co. in 1864. The company supplied linen thread for boots worn by Union soldiers during the Civil War.

The company recruited workers from the founders’ hometown of Brechin and by 1896 employed 300 people. Smith & Dove was sold to Ludlow Manufacturing in 1927, and the mills were closed the following year.

== Wealth and philanthropy ==
John Smith's personal wealth was significant, especially compared to other residents of Andover. The town's 1850 valuation assessed his personal property including his home, 45 1/2 acres of land, a twine factory, machine shop and other holdings at $31,020 (~$930,456 in 2025). In addition, Smith owned a significant personal estate, mostly in railroad and bank stock, whose assessed value was $47,324.

John Smith and the other founders of Smith & Dove Co. were philanthropists. John Smith, in particular, contributed to Phillips Academy and Abbot Academy.

John Smith was also instrumental in building Andover's Memorial Hall Library. Smith first proposed a reading room and library in honor of the town's residents who had died in the Civil War. He described the idea in a letter to his son, having been inspired by the public library he saw in his travels to Dresden, Germany. Smith put up $25,000 and sought contributions from others. His business partners gave $15,000. The effort eventually raised $63,000 (~$1.54 million in 2025), which was used to build the town's library in 1873 and to purchase books.

== Abolitionism ==
John Smith's abolitionism stemmed from his travels in Charleston, South Carolina, where he witnessed a slave auction. In a 1946 essay, Smith's granddaughter, Mary Byers Smith, described the young Scottish immigrant's decision in Fall 1819 to travel the country to learn “what was out here.” He traveled to Albany and Troy, New York, as well as New York City, where he found a berth on a ship bringing hay to Charleston, S.C. She quoted his account:

“Off Cape Hatteras we experienced ... a severe gale but arrived in the Charleston Harbor safely, and I went on shore. I saw a crowd of people gathered on a vacant lot; I always went where there was a crowd–and what, think you, I saw there? It went to my heart like a shot: it was a sale of slaves.

“I remained and saw them bid off; one young fellow, named Anthony, about seventeen years of age, brought $750. After Anthony was sold, a woman was put up, with a child on each side of her, and a babe in her bosom. … She wept bitter tears and it made me weep to see her. She was bid off, and my heart recoiled at the sight.

“If there is anything wicked it is for one man to take another, to make him his beast, to beat him and to get all the work out of him possible, and to allow him to go blindly down into eternity without the knowledge of God.”

Mary Byers Smith wrote that the encounter was “unquestionably” the “driving force” behind the founding of the Free Christian Church.

Smith's “strong belief that the end of slavery had to be opposed by the church” led him and others to withdraw from West Parish Church, where his brother, Peter, was a member. Smith and others founded the Free Christian Church on March 21, 1846, based on their abolitionist beliefs.
