= Lincolnshire (disambiguation) =

Lincolnshire is a county that is mainly in the East Midlands of England.

Lincolnshire may also refer to:

- Lincolnshire (district), a unitary authority due to be formed in 2028
- Lincolnshire (European Parliament constituency)
- Lincolnshire (UK Parliament constituency)
- Lincolnshire, Illinois, United States
- Lincolnshire, Kentucky, United States
- Lincolnshire Management, a private equity firm based in New York, United States
- The Lincolnshire, a historic mansion in Andover, Massachusetts, United States

== See also ==
- "The Lincolnshire Poacher", a traditional English folk song
- Lincolnshire Poacher (numbers station), a shortwave radio station
- Lincoln County
