= City Hall Historic District (Lowell, Massachusetts) =

Historic district in Massachusetts, United States

- U.S. National Register of Historic Places
- U.S. Historic district
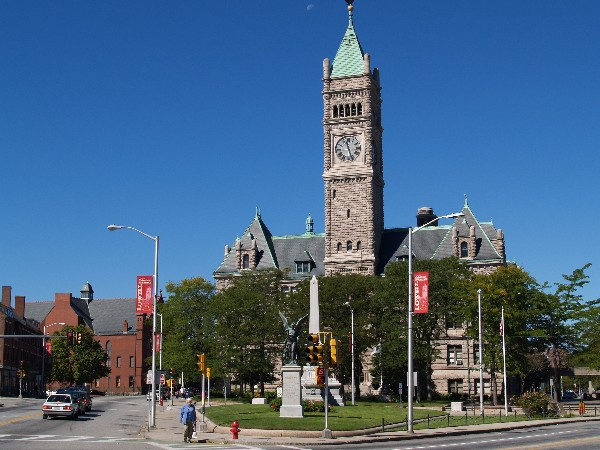
- Lowell City Hall

- Location within Massachusetts Location within the United States
- Location: Roughly area between Broadway and French Sts., Colburn St. and both sides of Kirk St., Lowell, Massachusetts
- Coordinates: 42°38′46″N 71°18′48″W
- Built: 1823
- Architect: Kirk Boot et al.
- Architectural style: Greek Revival, Romanesque Revival, Richardsonian Romanesque
- NRHP reference No.: 75000156 (original); 88001906 (increase)

Significant dates
- Added to NRHP: April 21, 1975
- Boundary increase: October 13, 1988

The City Hall Historic District is a historic district in Lowell, Massachusetts, United States, bound roughly by Broadway, Colburn, and Kirk streets. The centerpiece of the district is the Richardsonian Romanesque City Hall, built in 1893 to a design by Merrill & Cutler, with its 180-foot (55 m) clock tower.

The district features Greek Revival and Romanesque Revival architecture, including work by Kirk Boott. City Hall Historic District was added to the National Register of Historic Places in 1975 and expanded in 1988.

== Gallery ==
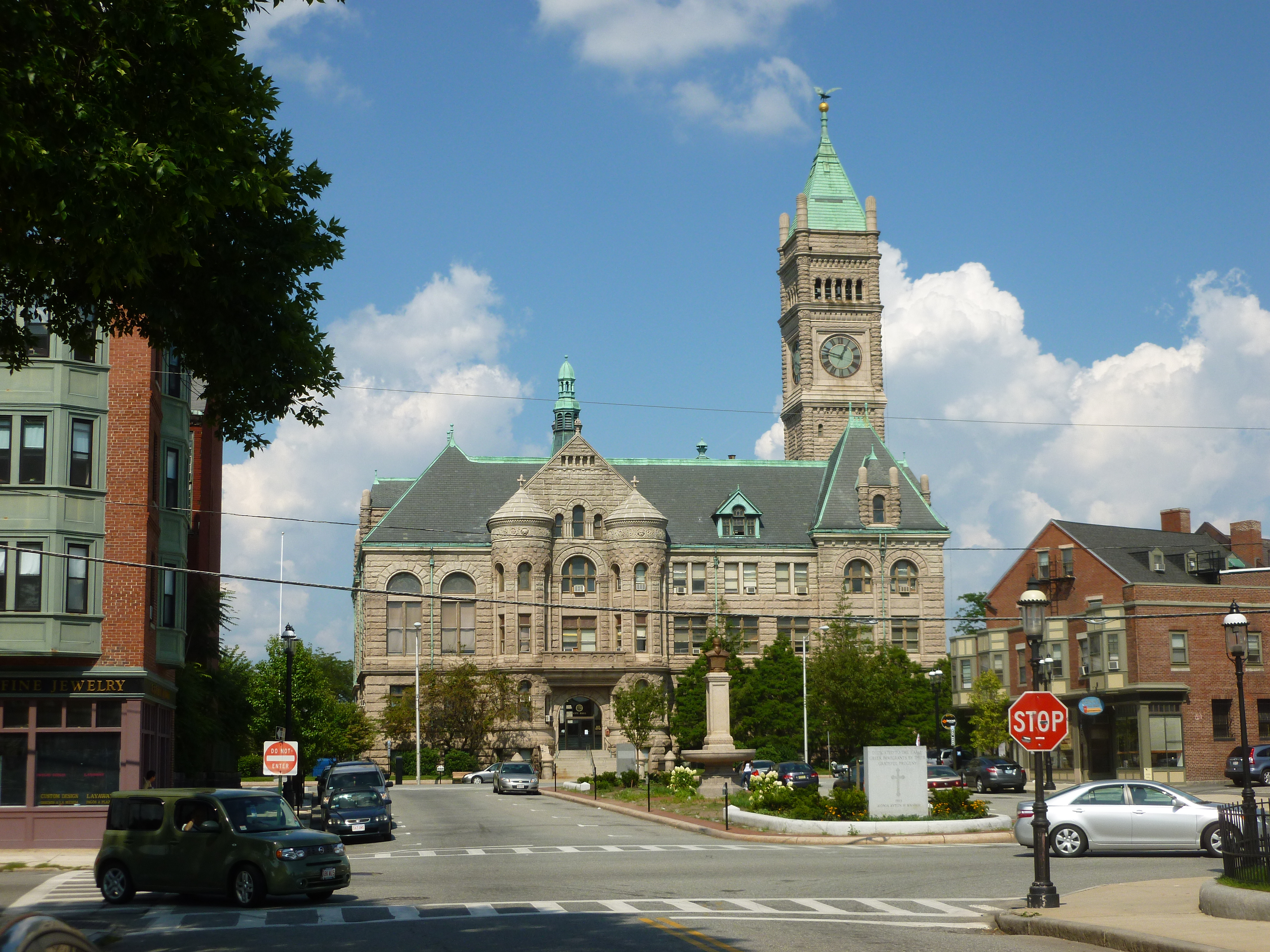

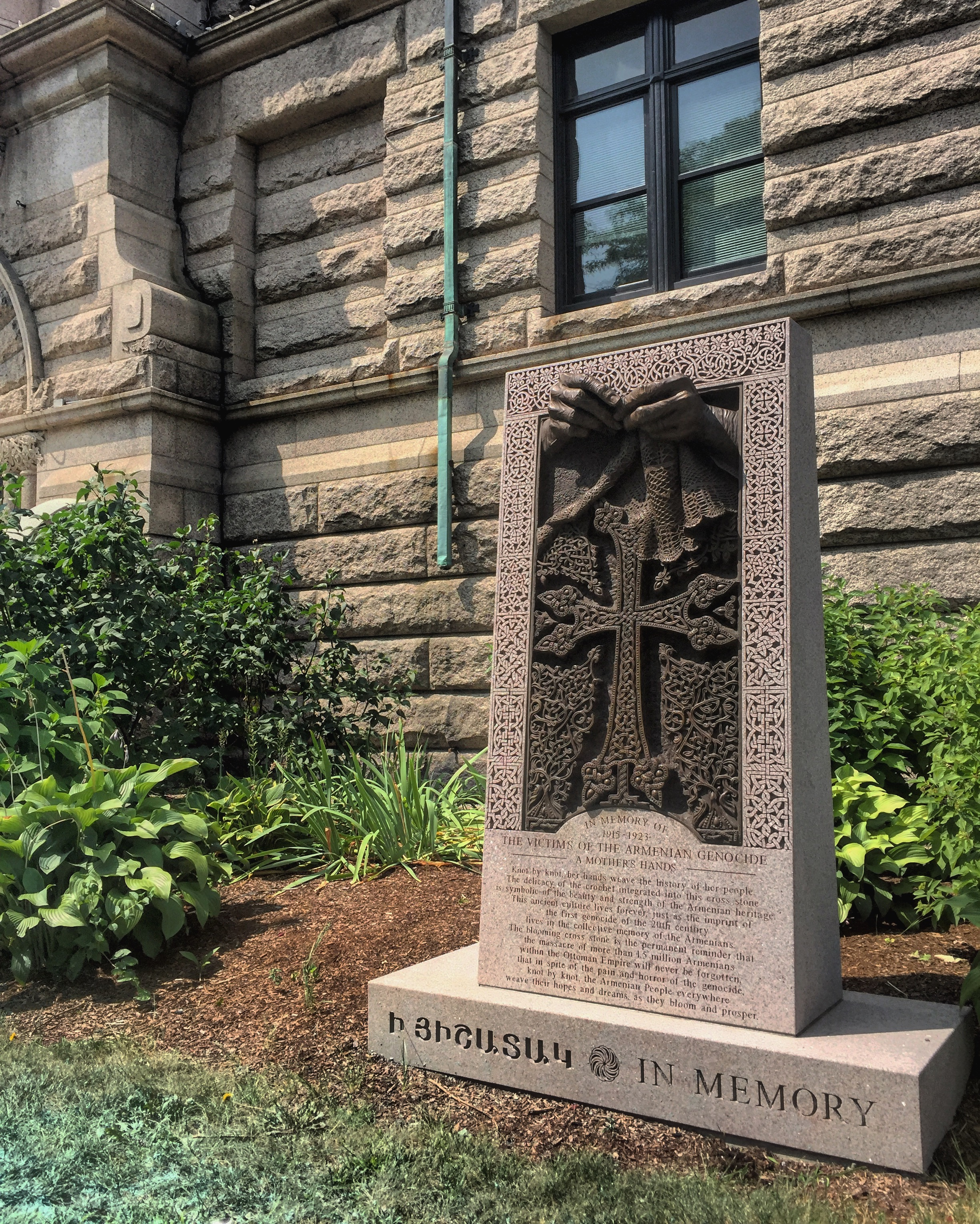
"A Mother's Hands" - Monument Dedicated to the Armenian Genocide at Lowell City Hall

== See also ==
- National Register of Historic Places listings in Lowell, Massachusetts
