= Wilton Town Hall =

- U.S. National Register of Historic Places

- Location within New Hampshire Location within the United States
- Location: 42 Main St., Wilton, New Hampshire
- Coordinates: 42°50′40″N 71°44′18″W
- Area: less than one acre
- Built: 1884
- Architect: Merrill & Cutler
- Architectural style: Queen Anne
- NRHP reference No.: 09000254
- Added to NRHP: April 20, 2009

Wilton Town Hall is located at 42 Main Street in downtown Wilton, New Hampshire. Built in 1886, the red brick building is a prominent local example of civic Queen Anne style architecture. In a common style of the day, it includes a theater space which was used for dramatic presentations, silent films, and vaudeville productions, before being converted to its present use as a movie theater. The building was listed on the National Register of Historic Places in 2009.

== Description and history ==
Wilton Town Hall occupies a prominent setting in the center of the town, on the east side of Main Street. It occupies a steeply sloping triangular lot bounded on the north by Maple Street. Its basement side is completely exposed on the Main Street side, and is composed of rustically cut Milford granite. The rest of the building is built out of load-bearing red brick, and is covered by a slate roof with a complex roofline. Windows in the upper levels are generally set in rounded-arch openings, and the roof is punctuated by several brick chimneys and a square clock tower. The clock is original to the building, made by George Milton Stevens of Boston, Massachusetts. The interior of the building is divided into civic offices and a theater. Its finishes are largely original, including fine woodwork on the main staircases, floors, and wainscoting.

The town hall was completed in 1886, and has housed town offices since then. It was the first building in the town dedicated to housing all of the town functions, including town clerk, police, and selectmen's offices. It was built in the aftermath of fires in 1874 and 1881 that destroyed much of what is now downtown Wilton. Its construction further cemented the importance of Wilton's East Village as the town's main village center. The hall was designed by Merrill & Cutler of Lowell, Massachusetts, and its design was featured in an architectural publication in 1884.

== See also ==
- National Register of Historic Places listings in Hillsborough County, New Hampshire
