= Presidential Village, Maynard, Massachusetts =

Neighborhood in Maynard, Massachusetts, US

Coordinates: 42.429779°N 71.447003°W

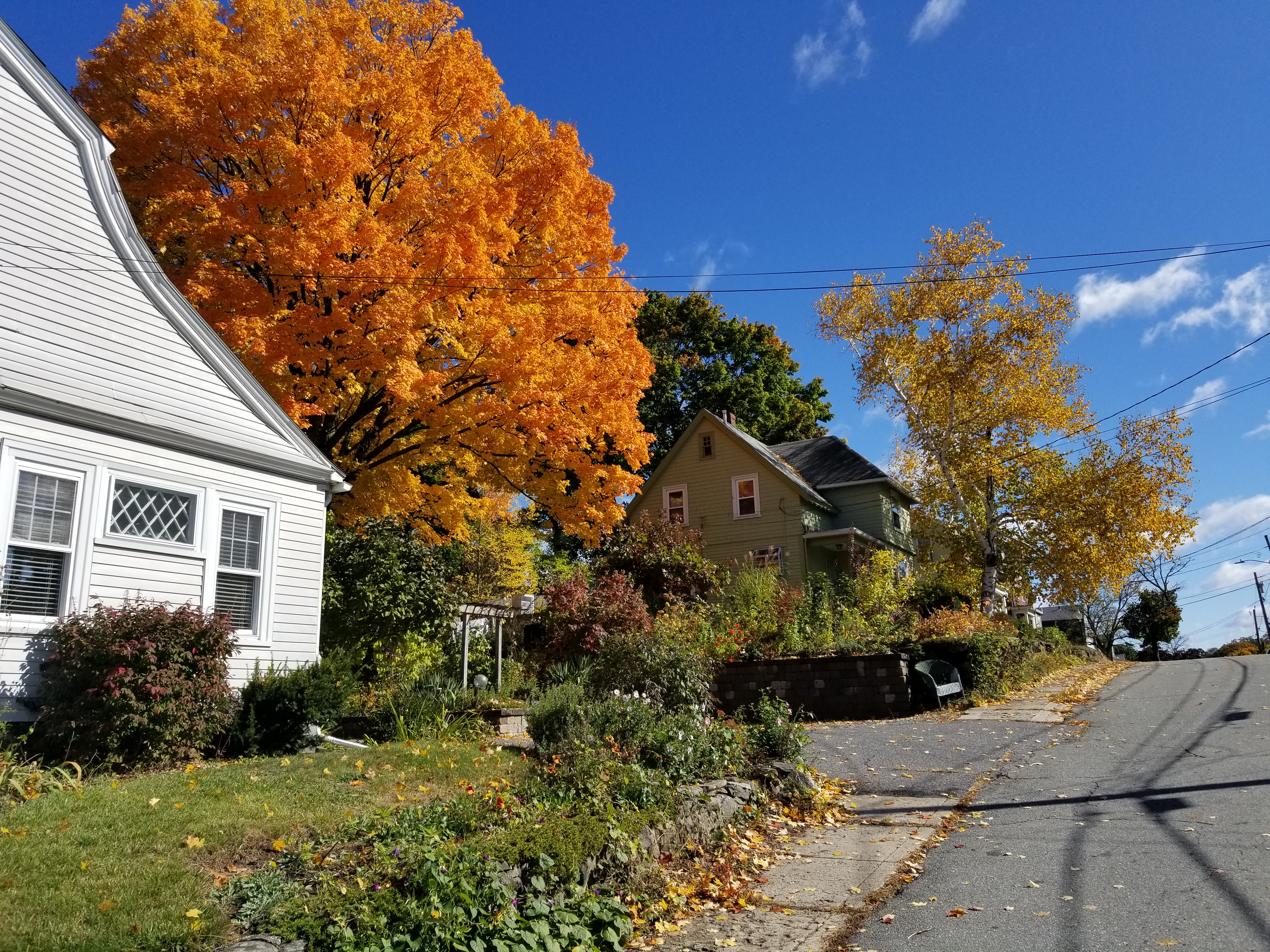
Roosevelt Street in Presidential Village

Presidential Village (also once known as New Village, Reardonville, and Mahoneyville) is a residential neighborhood of approximately 250 houses in Maynard, Massachusetts, where almost all of the streets are named after the post-American Civil War U.S. Presidents: Ulysses Grant, Rutherford Hayes, James Garfield, Chester Arthur, Grover Cleveland, Benjamin Harrison, William McKinley, and Theodore Roosevelt. Across from Harrison Street is the Coolidge Park Playground and former Calvin Coolidge School (1905), named after President Calvin Coolidge in 1932.

The American Woolen Company started construction of the neighborhood in 1902 as rented mill worker housing - small houses on small lots. The mill owned the housing until August 1934 when it put 101 houses and 49 two-family dwellings up for auction. The single-family houses sold for about $1100 to $1400. The neighborhood remains largely preserved in its original form. Prior to the construction the land had been farmland belonging to the Reardon and Mahoney families.

According to a Boston Globe newspaper article at the time, New Village was a "model village," and a great improvement over the many factory sponsored housing projects that the newspaper described as "barracks-like rows of apartment houses." Houses in New Village, by contrast, varied by style of architecture. Each house was freestanding with sufficient space for a garden and trees. Furthermore, while all of Maynard enjoyed a public water system in the early 1900s, New Village was the only neighborhood in Maynard that had sewers. In the assessment of the Boston Globe, "....there probably is not today anywhere in New England a similar number of houses designed for occupancy of mill employes(sic) equal in all respects to these."

The Town of Maynard Historical Commission has created six self-guided historic walking tours. Tour #3 visits New Village: "Thirteen different styles of houses were built and are designated as Types A-M. The village was built on the old Mahoney and Reardon farms and boasted a private sewer system. Each house had pine flooring, a cold water tap, a toilet in the cellar, and no central heat. Houses were rented to mill employees for $3-6 per month."

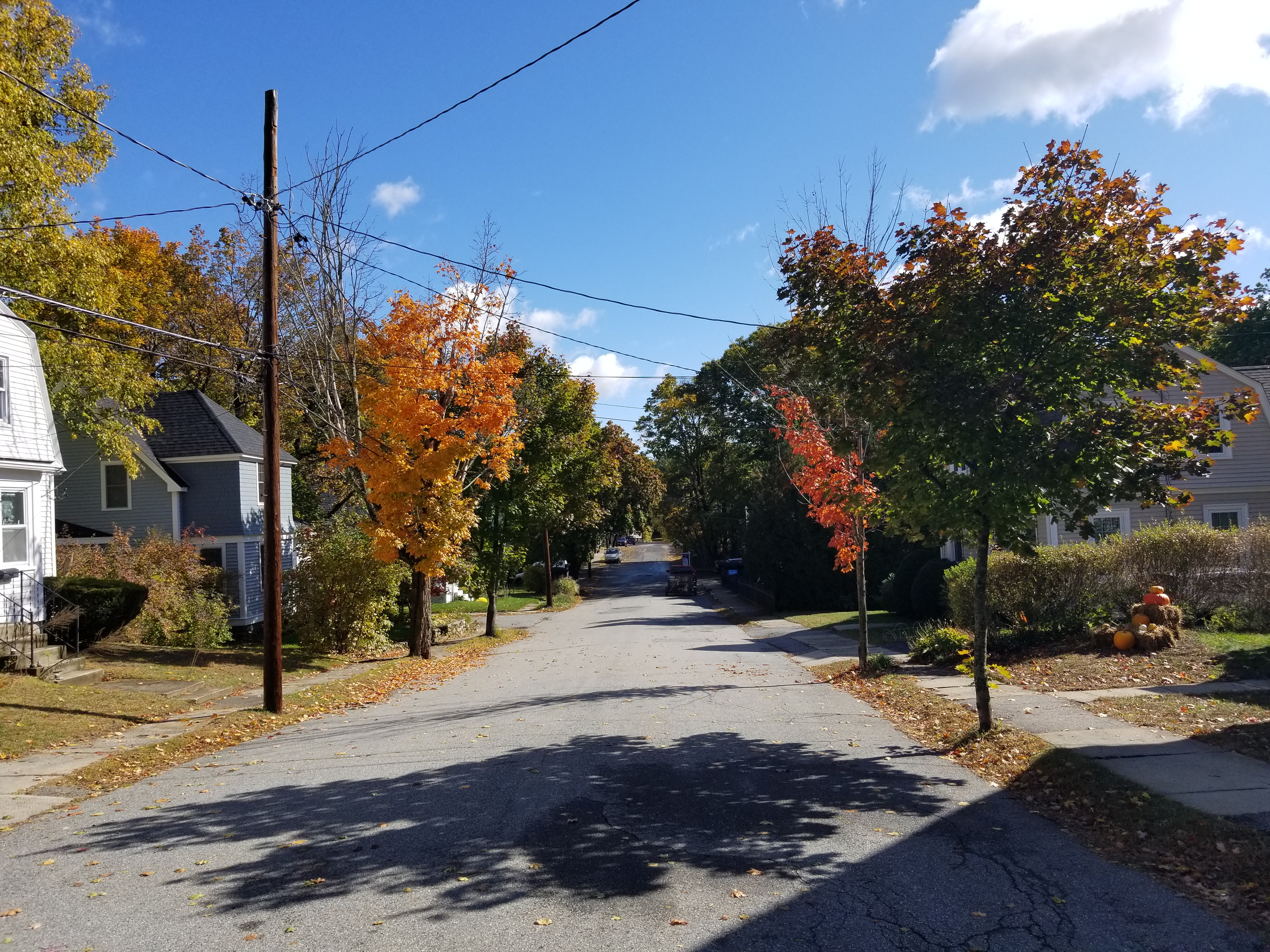
Harrison Street in Presidential Village

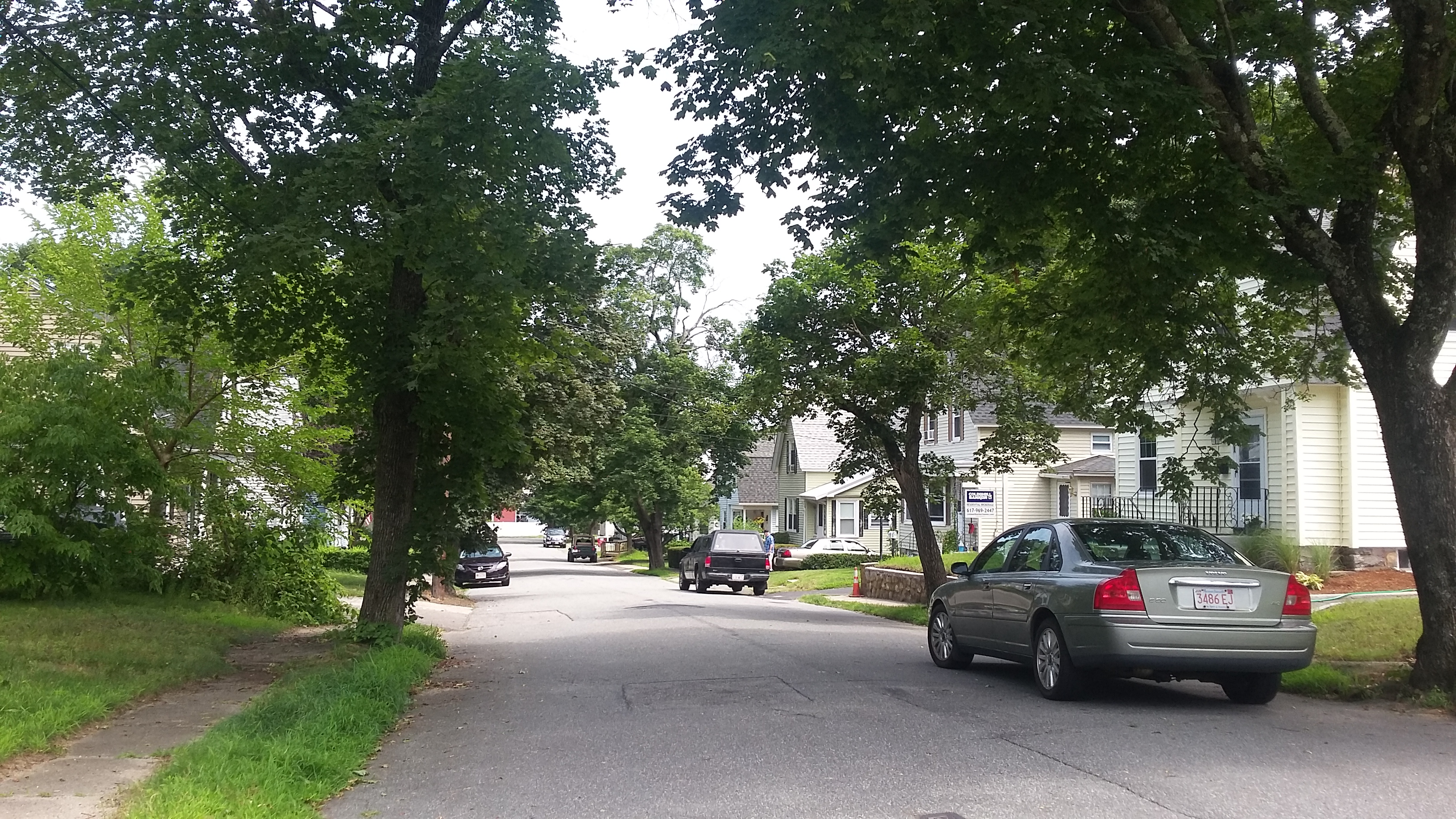
Grant Street in Presidential Village

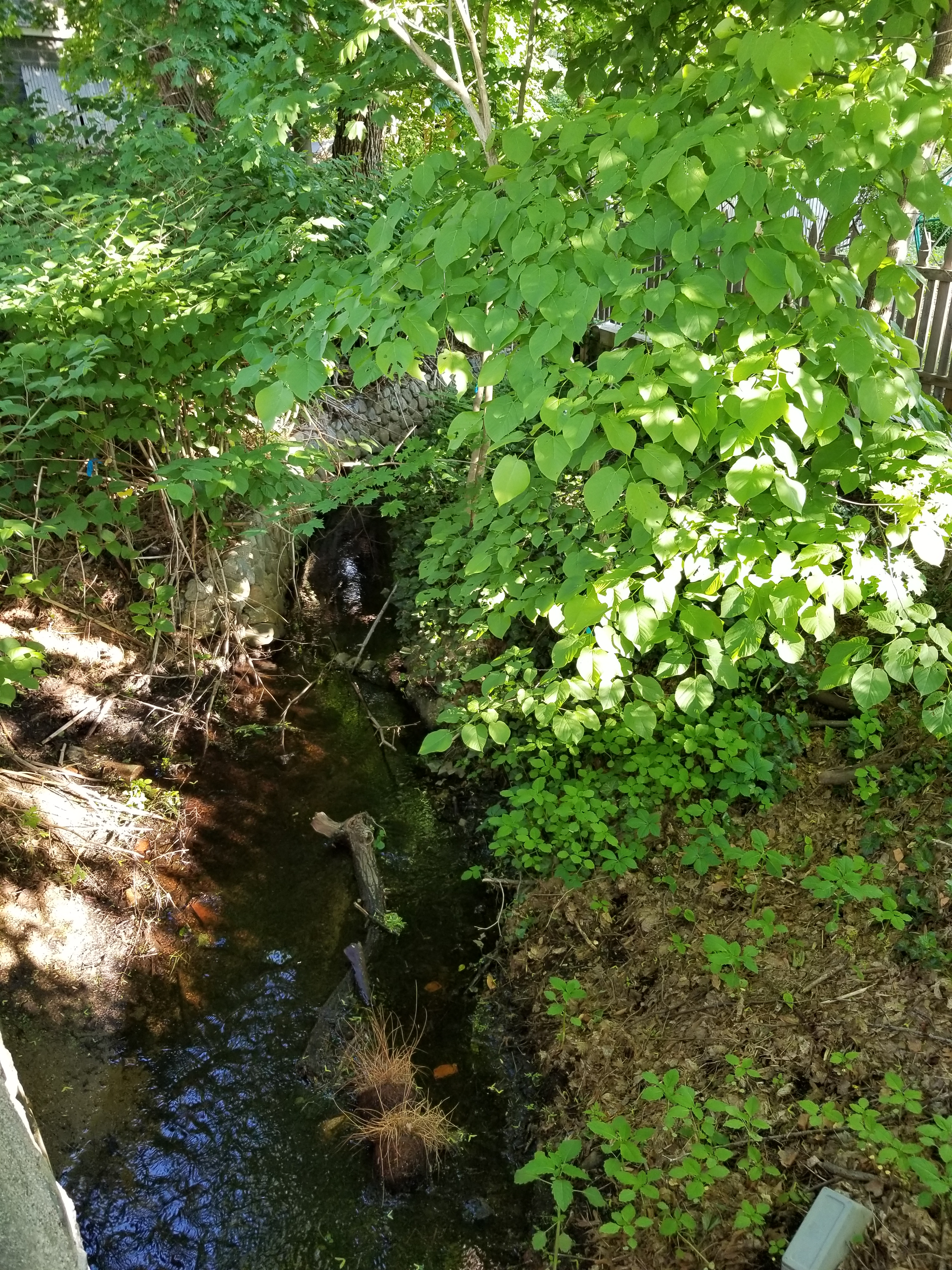
Brook in Presidential Village as viewed from McKinley Street bridge

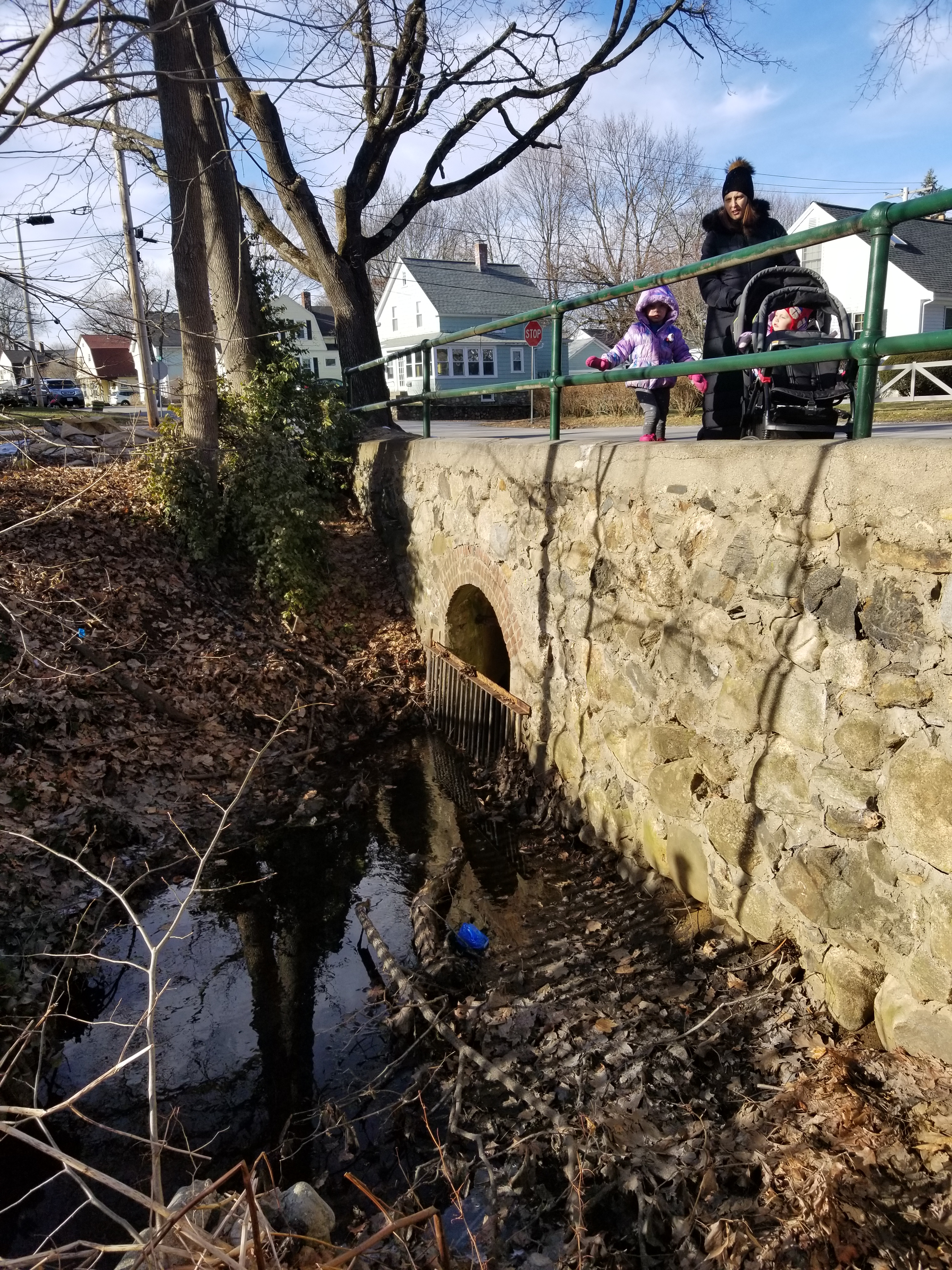
McKinley Street bridge and tunnel which channels the brook under the village into the Assabet River
