= Otis A. Merrill =

American architect (1844–1935)

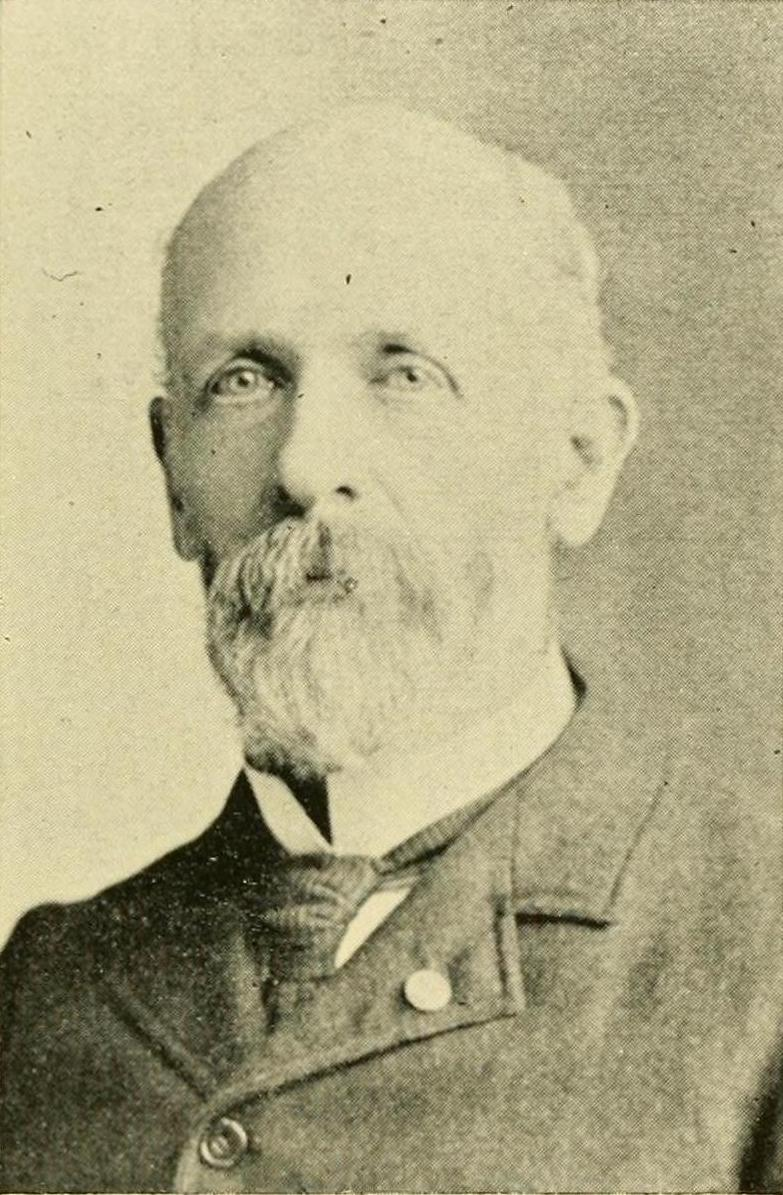
- Otis A. Merrill, circa 1896
- Born: August 22, 1844; Hudson, New Hampshire
- Died: September 14, 1935 (aged 91); Pepperell, Massachusetts
- Occupation: Architect
- Buildings: Wilton Town Hall; Lowell City Hall; The Lincolnshire

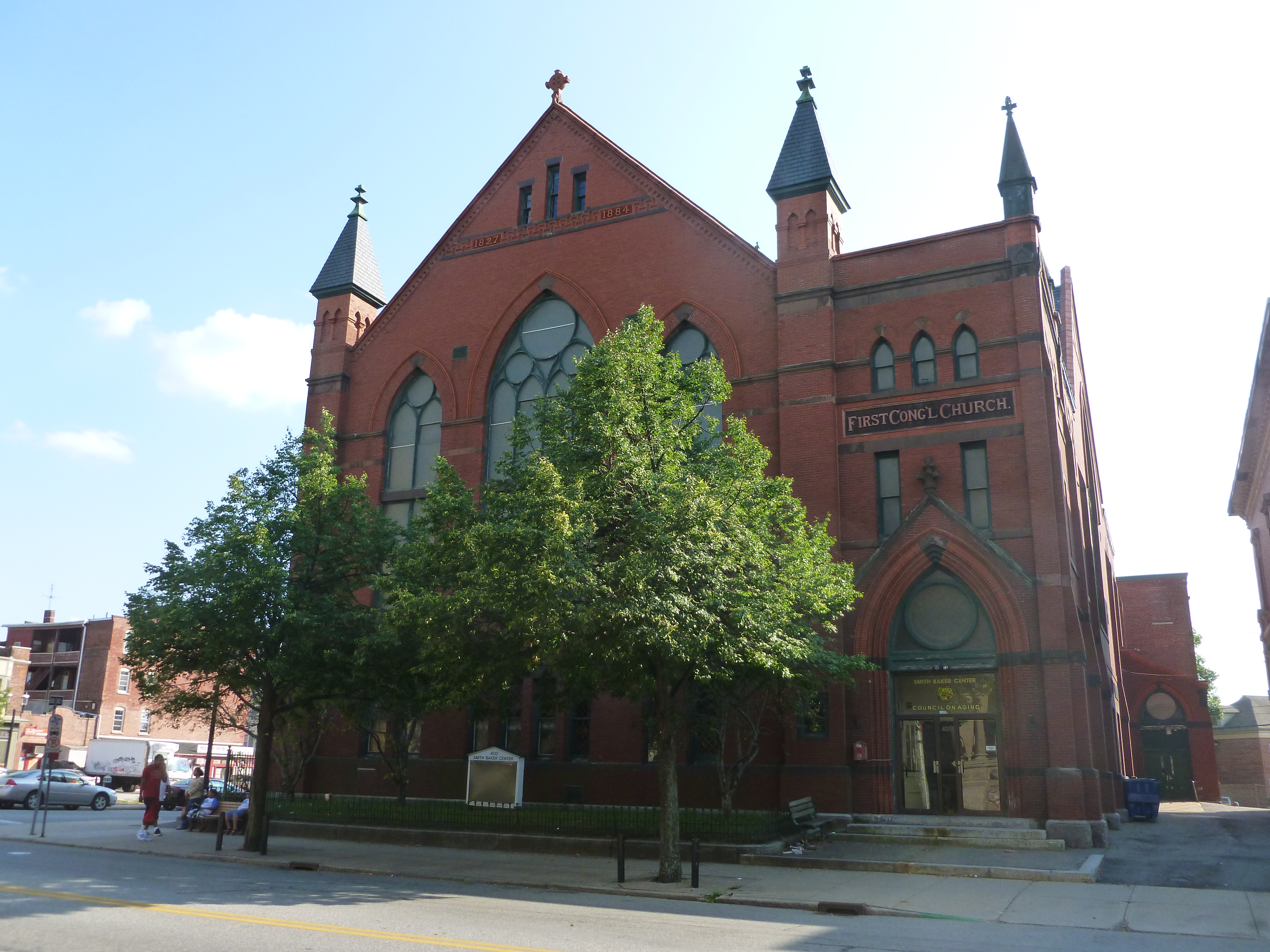
The former First Congregational Church in Lowell, completed in 1885

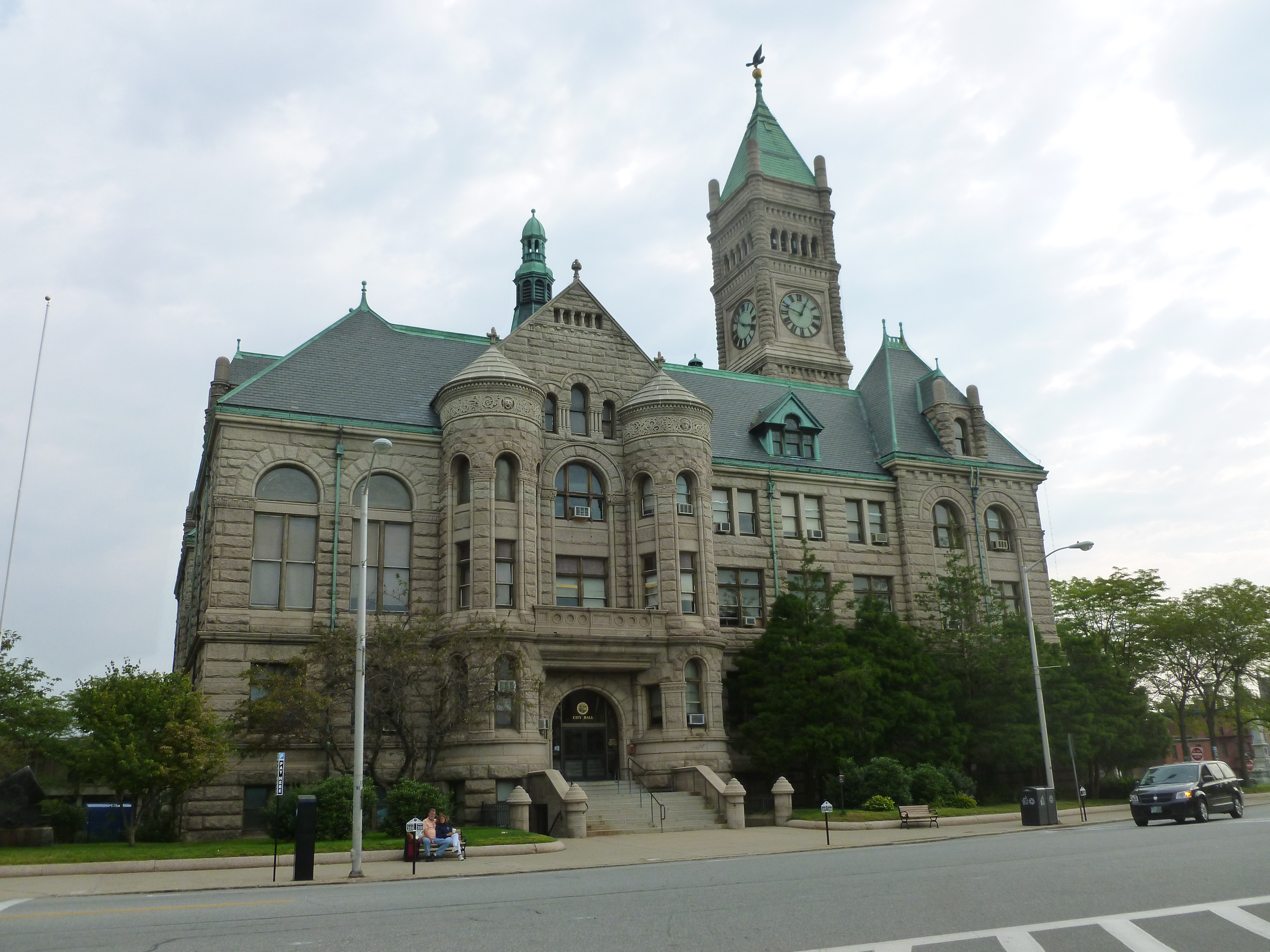
The Lowell City Hall, completed in 1893

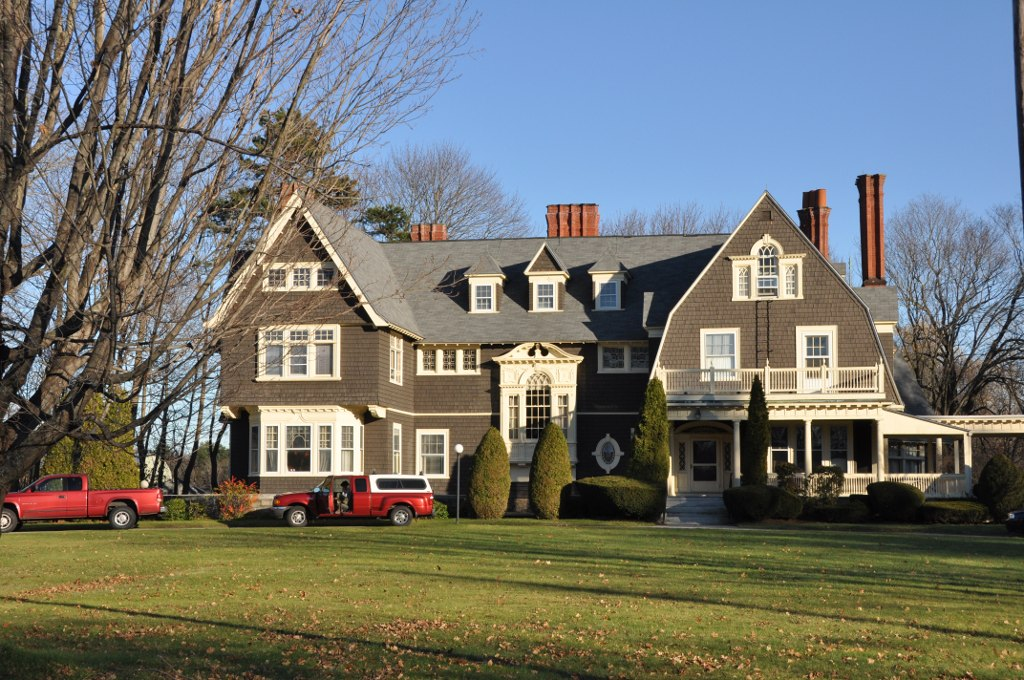
The Lincolnshire in Andover, completed in 1898

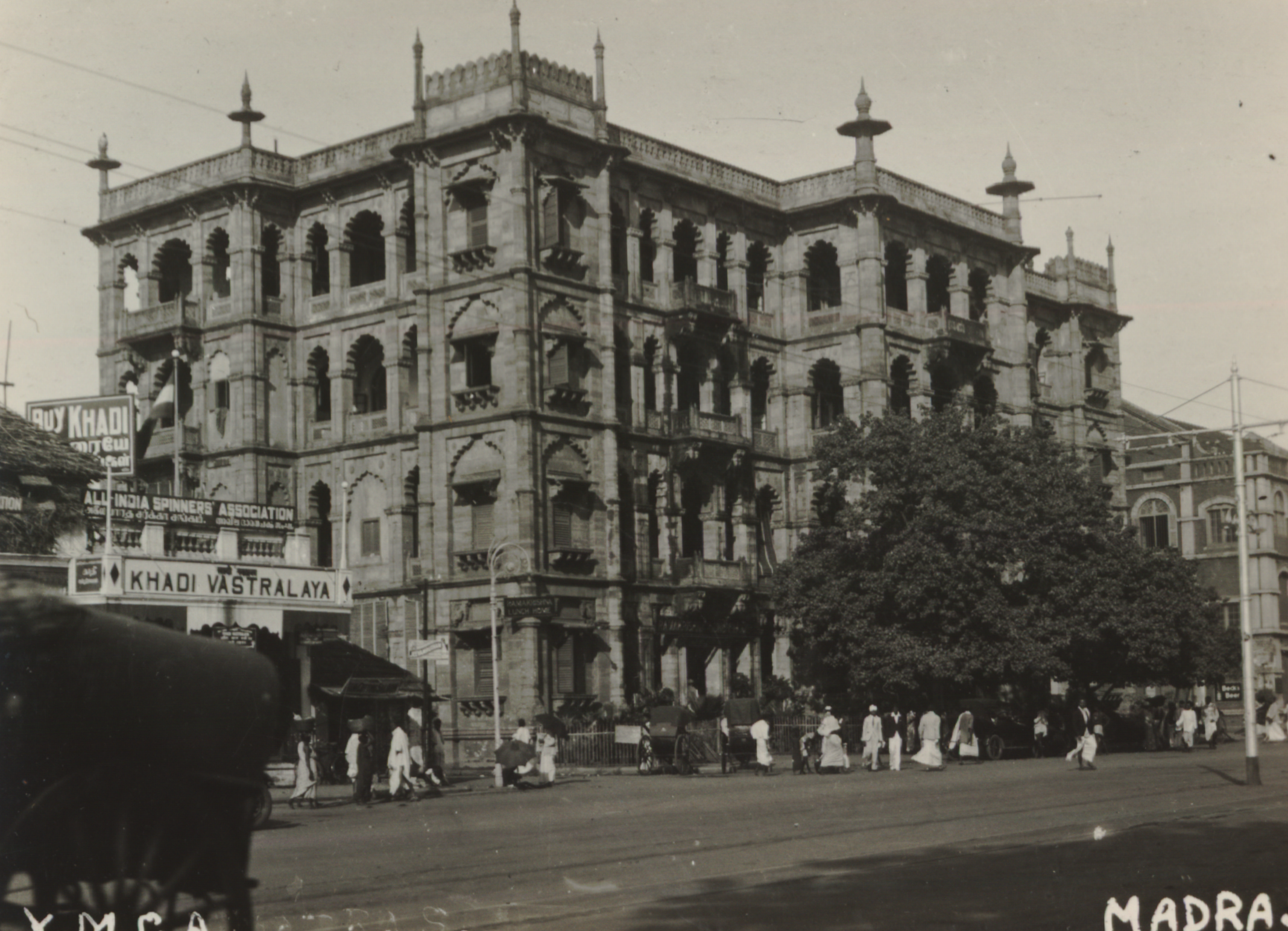
The YMCA in Madras, completed in 1899

Otis A. Merrill (August 22, 1844 – September 14, 1935) was an American architect. In association with various partners he practiced architecture in Lowell, Massachusetts, from 1873 until 1900.

== Life and career ==
Otis Addison Merrill was born August 22, 1844, in Hudson, New Hampshire, to Benjamin Arnold Merrill and Mary Jane (Winn) Merrill. He was educated in the local schools. At the age of 18, during the American Civil War, he enlisted in the Union Army with the 7th New Hampshire Infantry Regiment. He was awarded a Gillmore Medal for his conduct during the Second Battle of Charleston Harbor. He was discharged July 7, 1865, at Concord with the rank of sergeant. After the war he went to Haverhill, Massachusetts, where he learned the carpentry trade, moving to Lowell in 1869. After four more years and with some self-training in architecture, he established himself as an architect in Lowell in 1873. In 1878 he formed a partnership with Charles S. Eaton, a Lowell native who had just graduated from the Massachusetts Institute of Technology. The partnership of Merrill & Eaton was dissolved in 1880. Two years later in 1882 he formed a partnership with Arthur S. Cutler, an Andover native, who had joined Merrill's office as a draftsman in 1876. Merrill & Cutler was dissolved in 1897, and Merrill formed a new partnership, Merrill & Clark, with draftsman Edwin R. Clark. In April 1899 Clark left to open his own office, and Merrill was joined by Perley F. Gilbert, a native of St. Johnsbury, Vermont, and graduate of MIT. Merrill & Gilbert practiced together until Merrill's retirement in November 1900. The office continued under Gilbert and his successors until 1990.

Merrill's practice was centered on Massachusetts, and he and his partners were well known as architects of public buildings and schools in Massachusetts and New Hampshire. His most prominent building was the Lowell City Hall, begun in 1890 and completed 1893, with a design based on the Allegheny County Courthouse by H. H. Richardson. An unusual foreign project was for a YMCA in Madras, now Chennai, in India. Plans for this building, which was the gift of John Wanamaker, were drawn and accepted in the United States in 1896. Merrill & Cutler designed the building in an Italian Gothic style. In 1897, after being sent to India, they were revised by local architect George S. T. Harris at the suggestion of Governor Arthur Havelock. Though the floor plans were unchanged, Harris redrew the elevations to be more in keeping with the local architecture, in what is now known as the Indo-Saracenic style. The building was finished in 1899.

== Personal life ==
Merrill was married three times. He was married first in 1870 to Maria Jennie Moore of Pelham, New Hampshire, who died in 1882. He married second in 1883 to Anna Maud Smith of Worcester, who died in 1886. He married third in 1889 to Anna E. Boynton of Pepperell. He had a total of six children. During their time in Lowell, Merrill and his family lived in a house now numbered 92 Wannalancit Street, a Second Empire cottage which he designed and built himself in 1870. After his retirement, Merrill and his wife moved to her hometown of Pepperell. She died there March 6, 1929, followed by her husband September 14, 1935.

== Legacy ==
The Lowell architects Frederick W. Stickney and Harry Prescott Graves worked for Merrill before opening their own offices.

At least two buildings designed by Merrill and his partners have been listed on the United States National Register of Historic Places, and others contribute to listed historic districts.

== Architectural works ==
- Branch Street Fire Station, 45 Branch St, Lowell, Massachusetts (1877)
- Fiske Building, 219 Central St, Lowell, Massachusetts (1877)
- Lowell City Stable (former), 276 Broadway St, Lowell, Massachusetts (1877)
- Appleton Bank Building, 166 Central St, Lowell, Massachusetts (1878)
- Asa C. Russell house, (Note: A contributing property to the Wilder Street Historic District, listed on the National Register of Historic Places in 1995.) 331 Wilder St, Lowell, Massachusetts (1879)
- Tucker House, Phillips Academy, Andover, Massachusetts (1880)
- Central Block, Central and Middle Sts, Lowell, Massachusetts (1881, demolished)
- Gates Block, (Note: A contributing property to the City Hall Historic District, listed on the National Register of Historic Places in 1975.) 307 Market St, Lowell, Massachusetts (1881)
- Old Ladies' Home (former), 520 Fletcher St, Lowell, Massachusetts (1881)
- Graves Hall, Phillips Academy, Andover, Massachusetts (1882–83 and 1891–92)
- Abel T. Atherton house, (Note: A contributing property to the Belvidere Hill Historic District, listed on the National Register of Historic Places in 1995.) 236 Fairmount St, Lowell, Massachusetts (1883)
- Wilton Town Hall, 40 Main St, Wilton, New Hampshire (1883–84, NRHP 2009)
- First Congregational Church (former), 400 Merrimack St, Lowell, Massachusetts (1884–85)
- Sargent School (former), 7 Cross St, Graniteville, Massachusetts (1884)
- Phillips Hall, Phillips Academy, Andover, Massachusetts (1885)
- Seventh New Hampshire Veteran Association Building, (Note: A contributing property to the New Hampshire Veterans' Association Historic District, listed on the National Register of Historic Places in 1980.) Lakeside Ave, Weirs Beach, New Hampshire (1885)
- The Moosilauke, Breezy Point Rd, Warren, New Hampshire (1886, burned 1953)
- Varnum School addition, Lowell, Massachusetts (1886, NRHP 1995)
- Central Fire Station (former), 45 Palmer St, Lowell, Massachusetts (1889)
- Concord High School (former), School St, Concord, New Hampshire (1889–90, demolished 1958)
- Eliot School (former), 10 Favor St, Lowell, Massachusetts (1889)
- Charles E. Bartlett house, 22 Bartlett St, Chelmsford, Massachusetts (1890)
- Lowell Armory, Westford and Grand Sts, Lowell, Massachusetts (1890–91, demolished)
- Lowell City Hall, 375 Merrimack St, Lowell, Massachusetts (1890–93)
- YMCA Building, William and 6th Sts, New Bedford, Massachusetts (1890–91, demolished)
- Howe Building, 11 Kearney Sq, Lowell, Massachusetts (1891–92)
- Odd Fellows Building, 84 Middlesex St, Lowell, Massachusetts (1891–92, demolished 1948)
- Sylvia Ann Howland School, Pleasant and Kempton Sts, New Bedford, Massachusetts (1892–93, demolished)
- Congregational Church of North Chelmsford, 15 Princeton St, North Chelmsford, Massachusetts (1893–94)
- Samuel Robinson house, 180 Jackson St, Lawrence, Massachusetts (1893)
- Jewett Building, 492–496 Merrimack St, Lowell, Massachusetts (1893)
- Stowe School, Bartlett St, Andover, Massachusetts (1894–95, demolished 1982)
- The Lincolnshire, 22 Hidden Rd, Andover, Massachusetts (1897–98, NRHP 1982)
- YMCA Building, (Note: Built with revisions by G. S. T. Harris.) NSC Bose Rd, Chennai, Tamil Nadu, India (1897–99)
- North Chelmsford School, North Chelmsford, Massachusetts (1899, demolished)
