= Winooski Falls Mill District =

Historic district in Vermont, United States

- U.S. National Register of Historic Places
- U.S. Historic district
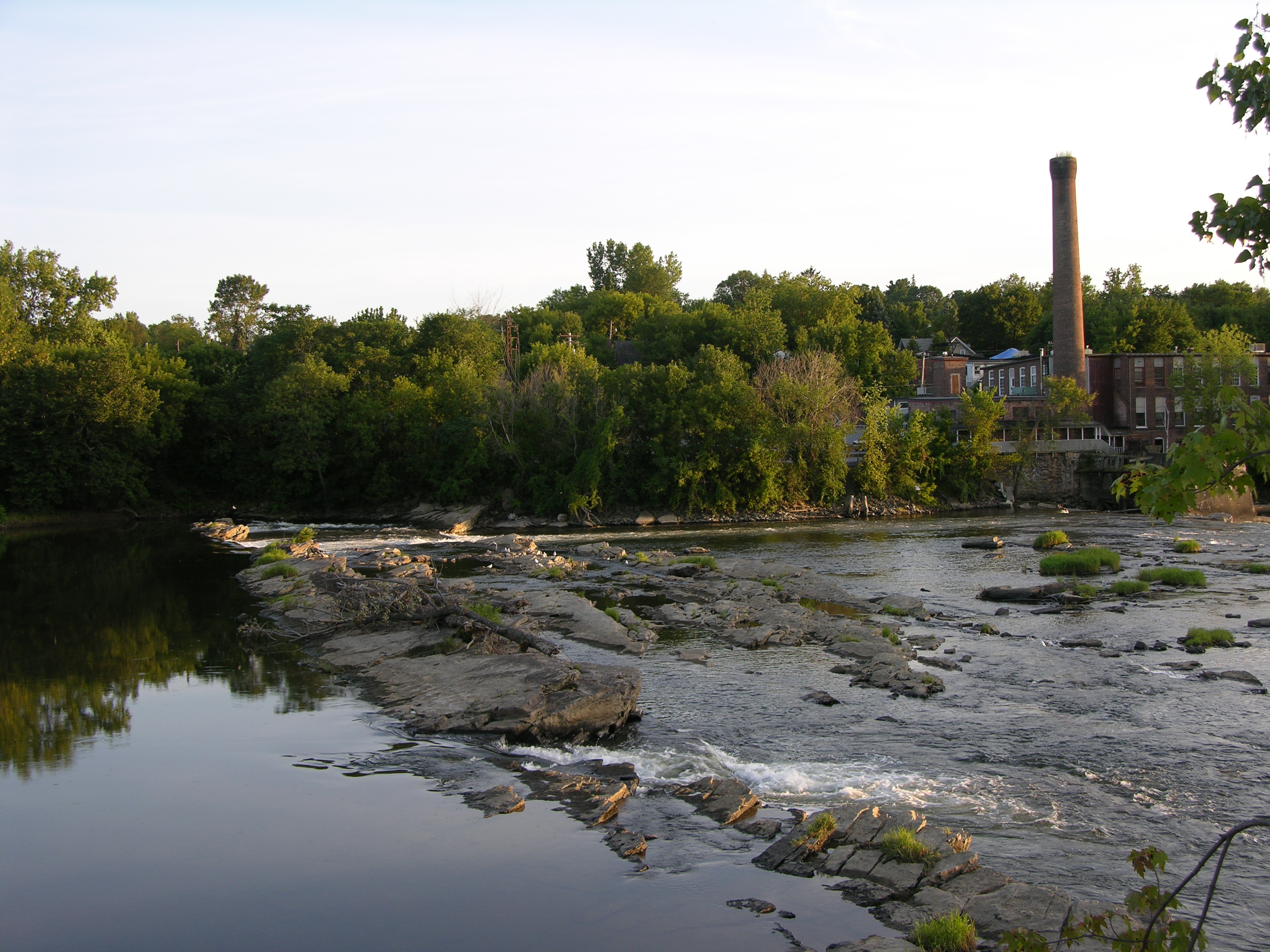
- Chace Mill on the Winooski Falls

- Location within Vermont Location within the United States
- Location: Winooski and Burlington, Vermont
- Coordinates: 44.488889°N 73.1875°W
- Area: 20 acres (8.1 ha) (original size); 1.4 acres (0.57 ha) (size of 1993 increase)
- NRHP reference No.: 79000223 (original); 93001009 (increase 1); 09000916 (increase 2)

Significant dates
- Added to NRHP: May 9, 1978
- Boundary increases: September 30, 1993; November 12, 2009

The Winooski Falls Mill District is located along the Winooski River in the cities of Winooski and Burlington, Vermont, in the United States of America. It encompasses a major industrial area that developed around two sets of falls on the river in the 19th century.

== Location ==
The Winooski River flows from the southeast into Burlington Bay, Lake Champlain. The city of Burlington in Chittenden County, Vermont is on the south bank and Winooski and Colchester on the north. It is 45 miles (72 km) from the Canada–US border. There are two sets of falls on the river; the settlement of Winooski is placed between the falls. The historic district refers to the mills built on both banks at the lower falls. The designated district stretches on the northern bank of the river to Center and Canal Streets, including 110 West Canal Street, and on the southern bank including Burlington addresses 485 to 497 Colchester Avenue, 5 to 21 Mill Street and 10 to 32 (even numbers only) Barrett Street. The Burlington addresses represent a 1993 enlargement of the district.

== History ==
In 1789, Ira Allen, one of the towns founders built a dam across the upper falls, and used it to power two saw mills to provide cut timber for the British market in Québec. It was in 1835 that the water rights to the Colchester bank were secured and in 1835 the Burlington Woolen Mill was constructed beneath the lower falls. They followed the employment patterns used in Lowell, Massachusetts, and employed single girls to work in the mills. A series of tenement houses were built to house the operatives, on common land on the hill leading to Winooski Falls Village. The second mill, the Winooski Mill, a cotton mill, was built in 1846 by the Winooski Mill Company on the Burlington side of the river. This operated as such until 1888 when it was reorganised into the Burlington Cotton Mill.

Wool remained the less profitable fiber until the cotton famine of the 1860. This and improvements in wool cleaning techniques caused rapid expansion and the construction of new mills. Water power systems improved, and new steam powered system expanded capacity. This require more operatives and a large number of French Canadians and Irish workers were employed. The Colchester Merino Mill and the Winooski Worsted Mill were built in the 1880s.

In 1902, the American Woolen Company purchased all the mills from the Burlington Woolen Company and refurbished them with modern equipment. The Champlain Mill was built in 1912. By 1922, the American Woolen Company was the state's largest employer and Winooski Falls split from Colchester, incorporating itself as the City of Winooski.

In 1927, there was a major flood where the dams were destroyed and all mills suffered heavy damage, from which some never recovered. The mills closed in 1954.

=== Lewis Hine ===
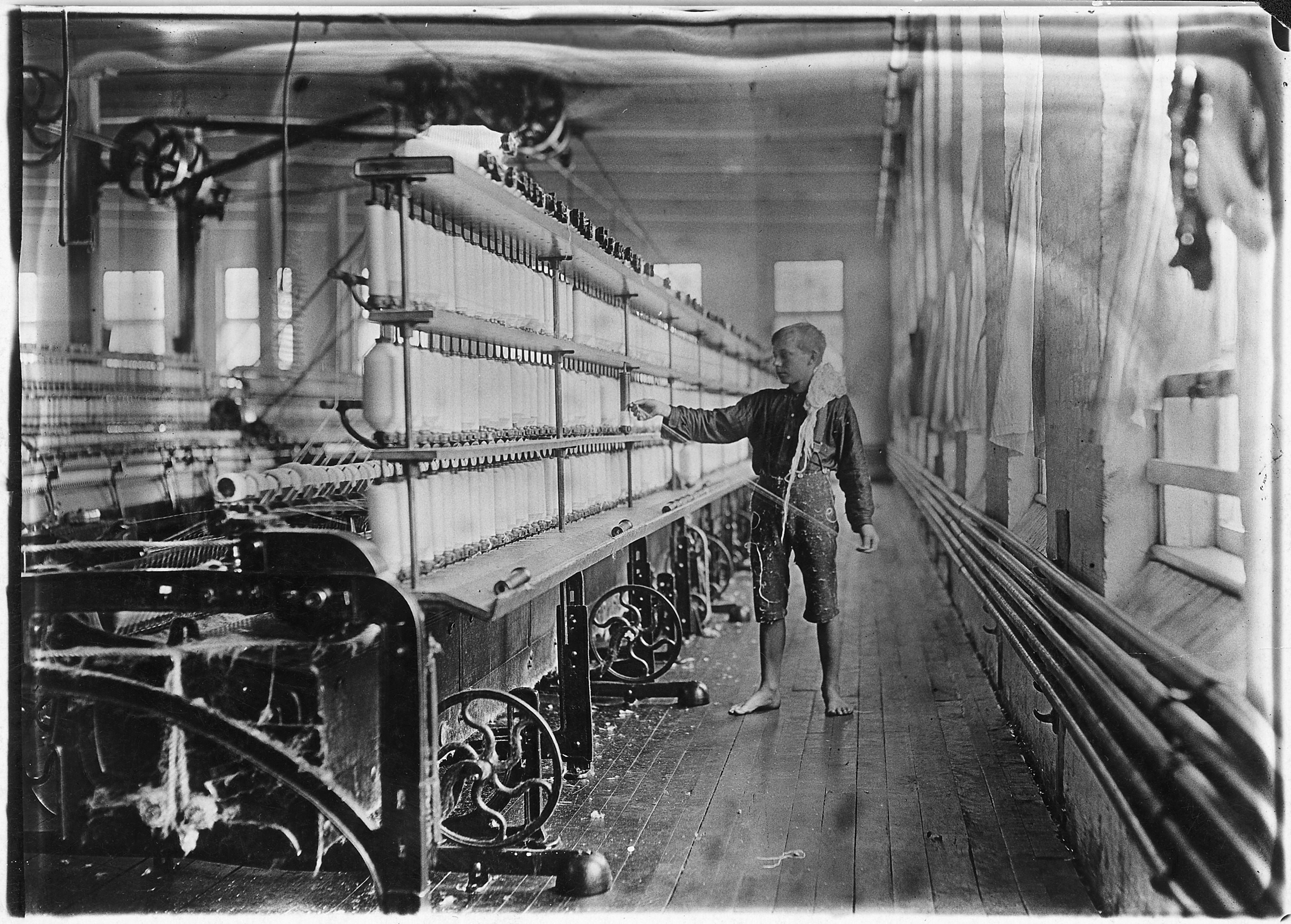
Lewis Hine photographed Raoul Julien working as a "back-roping boy in a mule spinning room in Chace Mill, in 1909.

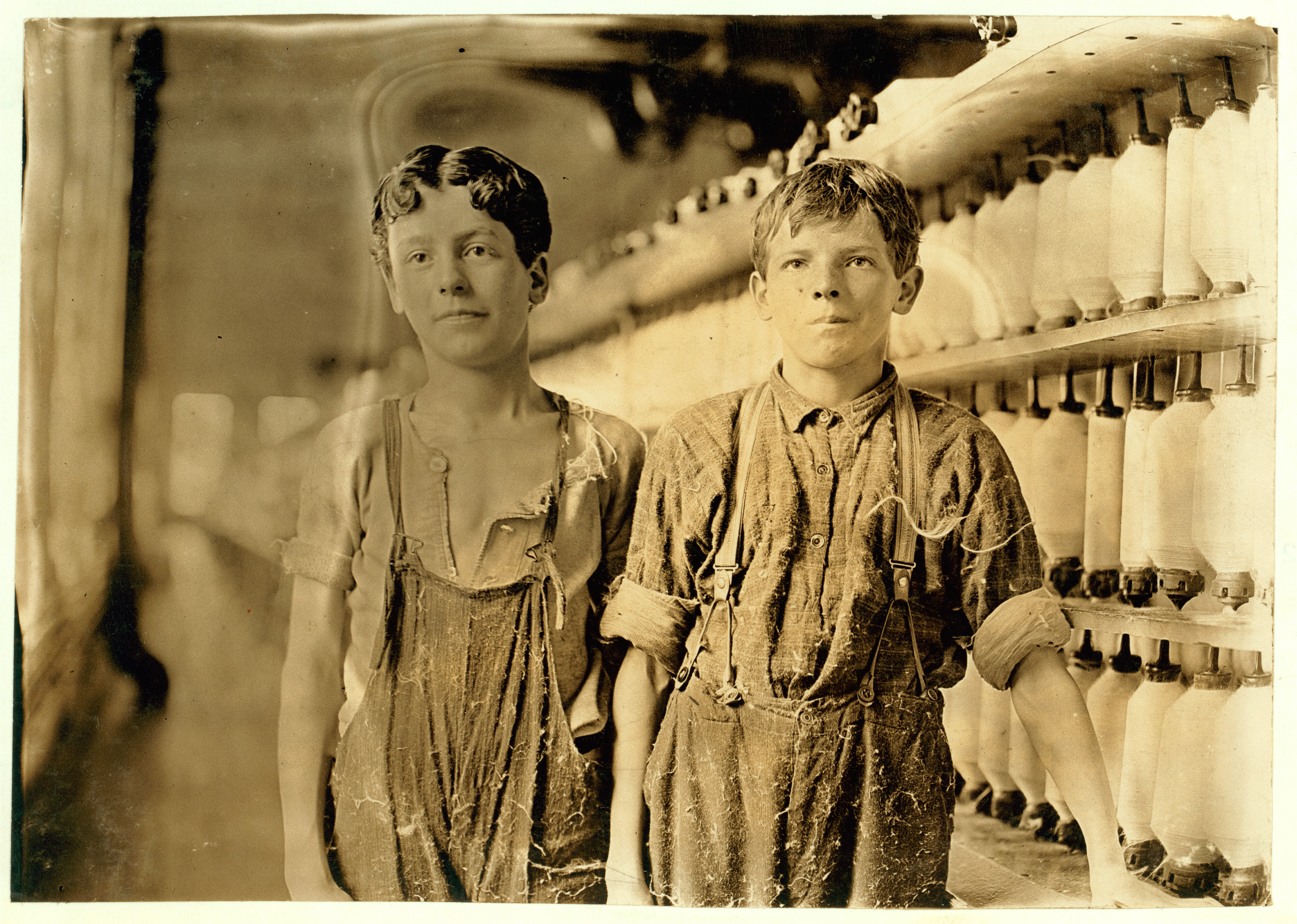
Leopold Daigneau and Arsene Lussier, 1909

Lewis Hine (September 26, 1874, Oshkosh, Wisconsin – November 3, 1940) was an American sociologist and photographer. Hine used his camera as a tool for social reform. His photographs were instrumental in changing the child labor laws in the United States. In 1908, he became the photographer for the National Child Labor Committee (NCLC), leaving his former teaching position. Over the next decade, Hine documented child labor in American industry to aid the NCLC's lobbying efforts to end the practice. In 1909 he visited Burlington, and took photographs in Chace Mill. These demonstrate the employment practices where children with French Canadian names are seen to be working in responsible posts, and equally they provide images of the machines in use at the time. Mule spinning was relatively rare in the United States; where ring spinning predominated.

== Buildings ==
=== Burlington Woolen Mill ===
This five-story mill was built of local stone over a canal that drove its centrally placed waterwheel. It was built in 1837 and destroyed by fire in 1961. A timber dam was constructed across the lower falls to provide a head for this wheel. The timber dam was destroyed in the floods of 1927. As of 1921 the Burlington Mills employed 1,500 workers who produced items such as Kerseys, Friezes, Meltons, Thibets and worsted dress goods.

=== Chace Cotton Mill ===
44°29′18″N 73°11′06″W

A three-story, 34-bay brick-built mill built on the site of a previous mill. Water for the waterwheel entered through two head gates connected to the upper dam. One gate opened to the working wheel, while the other lead to the wheel pit of a former wheel, a wallower passes the rotary motion to each floor, which contain line shafts. The Lewis Hine photograph shows that mill had spinning mules with a short travel. The mill was built by the Burlington Mill Company in 1892, and changed its name when it was purchased by the Chace Mills of Fall River in 1912.

=== Champlain Mill ===
A five-story mill, of 28 bays by 8 bays. (280 feet (85 m) by100 feet (30 m).

=== Colchester Merino Mill ===
The Colchester Merino Mill built in 1880 and extended in 1902 stands in a group of buildings built on a large rock outcrop. The buildings are dated from 1860 to 1902. The 1902 extension connected it to the Winooski Worsted Mill. Its name tells us that this was a woolen mill built to spin the finest long staple merino wool. It was a 3-story brick built mill with heavy beam construction. The twenty pane windows are topped by segmental brick arches. It was powered by an internal waterwheel which exploited a sliceway from an earlier mill, and used the head provided by the timber dam at the lower falls.

=== Winooski Worsted Mill ===
In the same complex as the Colchester Merino Mill, the Winooski Worsted Mill is a similar design. Worsted is a different thread from woolen using combing rather than carding techniques. The building was similar in design to the Merino Mill; the wood beams though were strengthened by metal tie rods.

=== Carbonizing Mill ===
This is a 1909, brick built structure built for one process in the cleaning of wool. It is a two-story brick building, with basement, oriented parallel to West Canal Street. It comprises a twenty-by-five bay main block, with projecting center bays, attached engine room and dye house with the typical louvred slat roof lights.

Raw wool would be weighed and sorted according to a variety of classifications, and sent on for opening, willowing and pickering. Wool fibers would be spread into smooth open layers, cut into slices and cleared of large pieces of vegetative matter. It would be sent for cleaning, or scouring in large vats containing a solution of water, soap and carbonate of potash, and then dried. Scouring did not remove all vegetative particles. In a carbonizing process the wool passed through bowls or troughs containing a solution of sulfuric acid or aluminum chloride where the remaining burrs were burnt off.

=== Timber dam ===
A lattice work of timber was built across the river, in a manner that was common in New England timber crib dams, what is interesting is the infilling. This was a very early example of the use of concrete. It is here that the Chase Mills Hydro-electric project will be situated.

== Current use ==
The Hydropower Reform Coalition has used the water channels to power a 7.4MW Turbo-Generator. Some of the buildings have been converted into loft apartments.

== See also ==
- National Register of Historic Places listings in Chittenden County, Vermont
