= American Woolen Company =

Designer, manufacturer and distributor of worsted and woolen fabrics

The American Woolen Company is a designer, manufacturer and distributor of men's and women's worsted and woolen fabrics. Based in Stafford Springs, Connecticut, the company operates from the 160-year-old Warren Mills, which it acquired from Loro Piana SpA in June 2014.

== History ==
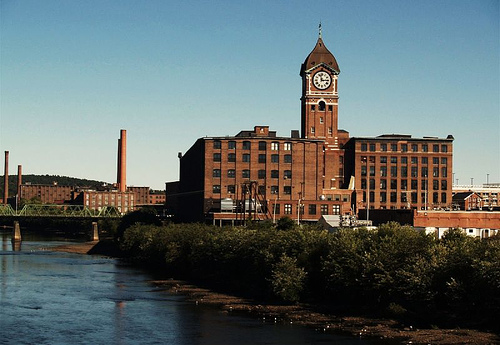
Ayer Mill, Lawrence, Massachusetts

=== 1899-1910s ===
The American Woolen Company was established in 1899 under the leadership of William M. Wood and his father-in-law Frederick Ayer through the consolidation of eight financially troubled New England woolen mills. At the company's height in the 1920s, it owned and operated 60 woolen mills across New England. It is most known for its role in the Lawrence Textile Strike of 1912.

The American Woolen Company was the product of the era of trusts. Overproduction, competition and poor management had brought the New England textile industry to its knees by the 1890s. In particular, family trusts, the main shareholders of many of the mills, insisted on receiving high dividends instead of making necessary capital improvements. Frederick Ayer, successful Lowell merchant, purchased the Washington Mills in Lawrence, Massachusetts, and hired his son-in-law, William M. Wood to run it. Wood had already successfully turned around a bankrupt mill in Fall River. With Ayer's financial backing, Wood brought together various under-performing mills in the aim of reducing competition and increasing prices. He convinced investors to permit profits to be reinvested into new plants and machinery.

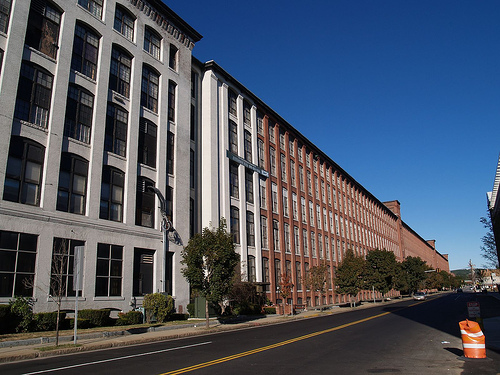
Wood Mill, Lawrence

In 1901, the company purchased the failing Burlington Mills in Winooski, Vermont, and restored their profitability. These mills closed in 1954.

In 1905, the American Woolen Company built the largest mill in the world, the Wood Mill in Lawrence, followed by the neighboring Ayer Mill in 1909. The Ayer mill's 22 foot diameter 4-sided clocktower is only a foot smaller than Big Ben and purportedly only second to it in size in the world (among chiming 4-sided clocktowers).

Following the 1912 Lawrence Textile Strike, the AWC was forced to increase wages. The company reached its apogee in the 1920s, when it controlled 20% of the country's woolen production. Most of these mill operations had started as 100% water-powered, but added coal-fueled steampower in the late 1800s as demand exceeded what could be provided by water alone.

=== 1910s-1950 ===
However, even though technology was continually updated, these unionized New England mills were unable to compete with non-unionized Southern mills able to produce staple woolen products, such as blankets, more cheaply. Additionally, fashions changed with the introduction of polyester and rayon, and demand for worsted wool plummeted by the mid-1920s. The two world wars were a boon to the AWC, keeping the company prosperous into 1945. American Woolen Company ranked 51st among United States corporations in the value of World War II military production contracts.

=== Workers housing ===
In 1902 the company built Presidential Village, a neighborhood of about 200 rental houses for workers at its mill in Maynard, Massachusetts. All of the homes were auctioned to highest bidders in August 1934. The company was also auctioning housing at other New England mills.

In the early 1920s American Woolen Company (re)built Shawsheen Village built on the site of the former Frye Village of Andover, Massachusetts, to house the company's middle to upper management, near the company headquarters.

=== 1950-present ===
Following the end of the Korean War, government contracts ended. Virtually bankrupt, the American Woolen Co. was purchased by Textron and incorporated into its Amerotron division in 1955.

In 1966 an Uxbridge, Massachusetts-based, wool blanket contractor purchased the American Woolen Company trademark in order to better support its business activity of the manufacturing and distribution of woolen blankets for the American domestic market. In 1987, American Woolen sold its Uxbridge blanket manufacturing facility, relocated to Miami, Florida, and focused its activity on the importing and wholesaling of woolen blankets targeting relief organizations, municipalities, aid agencies and the general hospitality sector.

In 2013 an investment group led by Jacob Harrison Long completed the purchase, carve out and realignment of American Woolen Company's business activity with the intent to focus the company on the design and manufacture of fine American-made worsted and woolen apparel fabrics.

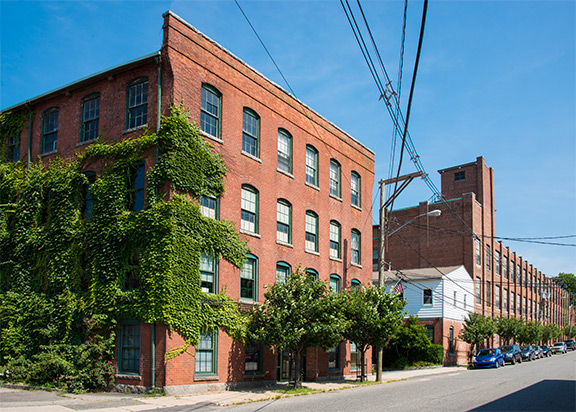
Warren Mills' primary building, 8 Furnace Avenue, American Woolen Company's headquarters

In June 2014, American Woolen purchased the Warren Mills complex from Italian luxury apparel group Loro Piana SpA, which had owned and operated the mill for 26 years. Recognized as being "on par with the best mills in Europe," Stafford Springs, Connecticut based Warren Mills is American Woolen Company's headquarters where the company produces worsted wool for men's suits and cashmere and camel hair for coats. The acquisition was made with the assistance of the Connecticut Department of Economic and Community Development, which provided American Woolen Company with a loan and a grant to help cover the building acquisition costs. The acquisition was made with the intent to "reintroduce luxury worsted and woolen textile manufacturing to the United States."

== Original Mills, some founded as early as 1846 ==
American Woolen Company was created by the assimilation of the following mills, March 29, 1899:

- Washington Mills, Lawrence, MA
- Fitchburg Mills, Fitchburg, MA
- Beoli Mills, Fitchburg, MA
- Valley Mills, Providence, RI
- National and Providence Worsted Mills, Providence, RI
- Fulton Mills, Providence, RI
- Saranac Mills, Providence, RI
- Riverside Worsted Mills, Providence, RI

== Later mills ==
- Assabet Woolen Mill, Maynard, MA
- Anchor-Inman Mills, Harrisville, RI
- Anchor-Sheffield Mills, Pascoag, RI
- Anderson Mills, Skowhegan, ME
- Arms Mills, Skowhegan, ME
- Baltic Mills, Enfield, Enfield, NH
- Bay State Mills, Lowell, MA
- Breaver Brook Mills, Dracut, MA
- Beoli Mills, Fitchburg, MA
- Bradford Mills, Louisville, KY
- Brown Mills, Dover, ME
- Burlington Mills, Winooski, VT
- Champlain Mills, Winooski, VT
- Chase Mills, Webster, MA
- Dracut Mills, Dracut, MA
- Forest Mills, Bridgton, ME
- Foxcroft Mills, Foxcroft, ME
- Fulton Mills, Fulton, NY
- Globe Mills, Utica, NY
- Hartland Mills, Hartland, ME
- Hecla Mills, Uxbridge, MA
- Indian Spring Mills, Madison, ME
- Kennebec Mills, Fairfield, ME
- Lebanon Mills, Lebanon, NH
- Manton Mills, Manton, RI
- Mascoma Mills, Lebanon, NH
- Moosup (Lower) Mills, Moosup, CT
- Moosup-Glen Falls Mills, Moosup, CT
- Naragansett Worsted Mills, Warren, RI
- Newport Mills, Newport, ME
- Oakland Mills, Maine, Oakland, ME
- Ounegan Mills, Old Town, ME
- Pioneer Mills, Pittsfield, ME
- Prospect Mills, Lawrence, MA
- Puritan Mills, Plymouth, MA
- Ram's Head Yarn Mills, Lowell, MA
- Ray Mills, Franklin, MA
- Riverina Mills, Medford, MA
- Rochdale Mills, Rochdale, MA
- Royalston Mills, South Royalston, MA
- Saranac Mills, Blackstone, MA
- Sawyer Mills, Dover, NH
- Sebasticook Mills, Pittsfield, ME
- Vassalboro Mills, Vassalboro, ME
- Waverly Mills, Pittsfield, ME
- Whitestone Mills, Elmville, CT
- Warren Mill, Stafford Springs, CT
