= Memorial Hall Library =

Public library of Andover, Massachusetts, United States

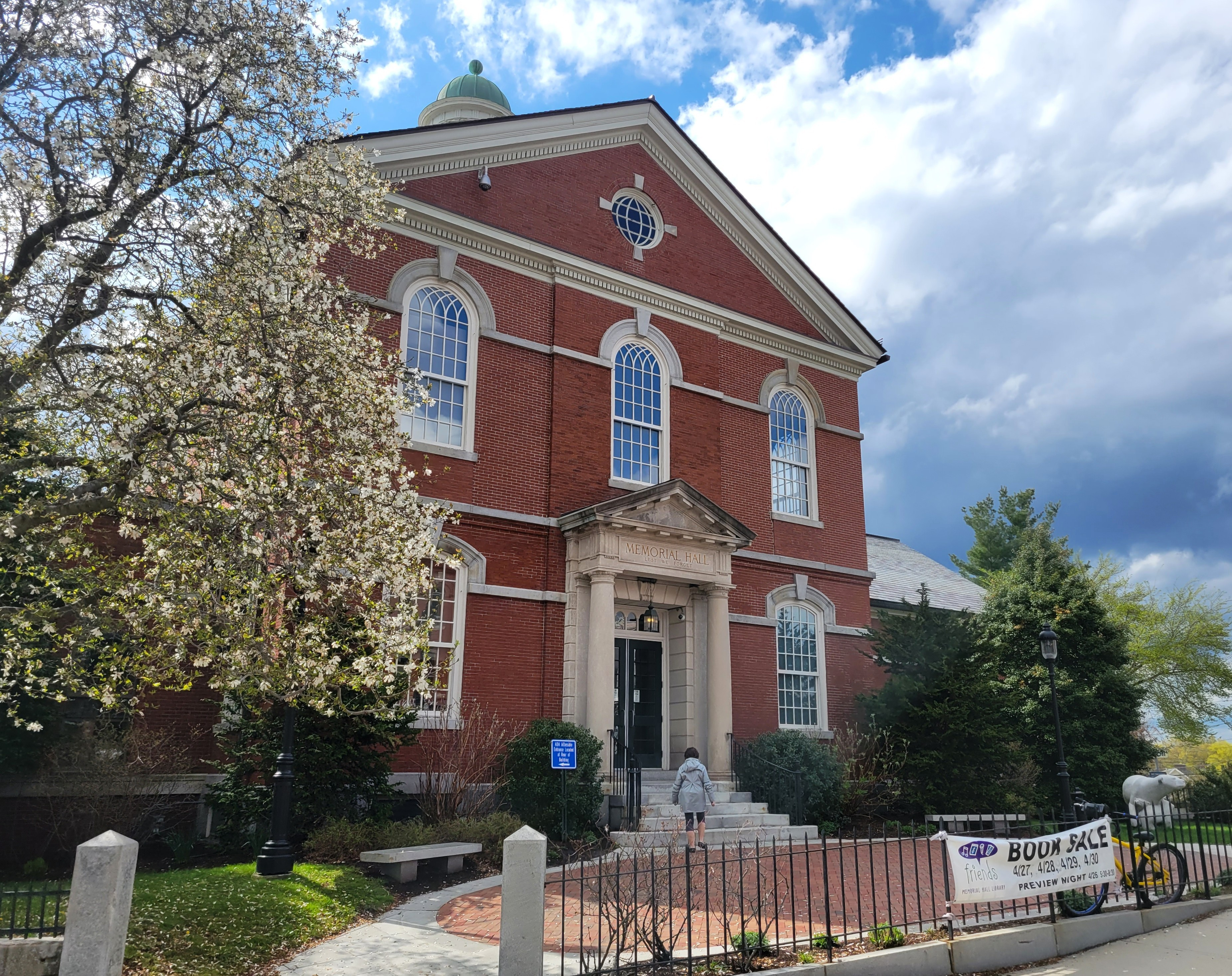
- Location: 2 North Main Street; Andover, Massachusetts
- Established: May 1873
- Architect: J.F. Eaton

Other information
- Director: Esmé Green
- Website: mhl.org

Memorial Hall Library is the public library of Andover, Massachusetts. Established in 1873, the library provides access to books, digital resources, educational programming, and community services for residents of all ages. The library is a founding member of the Merrimack Valley Library Consortium, a cooperative network of libraries that facilitates resource sharing and access to materials across the region.

The library offers circulating collections, public computers, internet access, printing, scanning, and fax services, as well as educational and cultural programming. Specialized services include a Makerspace, a Library of Things collection, and a Seed Library. The library also provides museum passes, home-delivery services for homebound residents, and outreach visits to assisted-living facilities. The library features a rooftop deck and outdoor patio, along with collections of music recordings in CD and vinyl LP formats.

The building was built with Italianate styling in 1873 to a design by J. F. Eaton, a longtime associate of the Boston architect Gridley J. F. Bryant. A bequest by Andover businessmen John Smith, Peter Smith and John Dove, proprietors of the Smith & Dove mill in Andover, was matched by citizens of the Town of Andover to fund the building of the library. Construction was by the firm of Abbott & Jenkins. It was designed to house the town library, which it still does, and to act as a memorial to the town's Civil War soldiers. It was renovated in 1927 under the direction of architects Coolidge & Carlson, at which time it acquired its Colonial Revival details. Small additions were completed in 1961 and 1968. In 1988 a large addition, which doubled the size of the building, was completed. This was designed by Shepley, Bulfinch, Richardson & Abbott. The building was listed on the National Register of Historic Places in 1982.

== See also ==
- National Register of Historic Places listings in Andover, Massachusetts
- National Register of Historic Places listings in Essex County, Massachusetts
