= Mill Agent's House =

Historic house in Maine, United States

- U.S. National Register of Historic Places
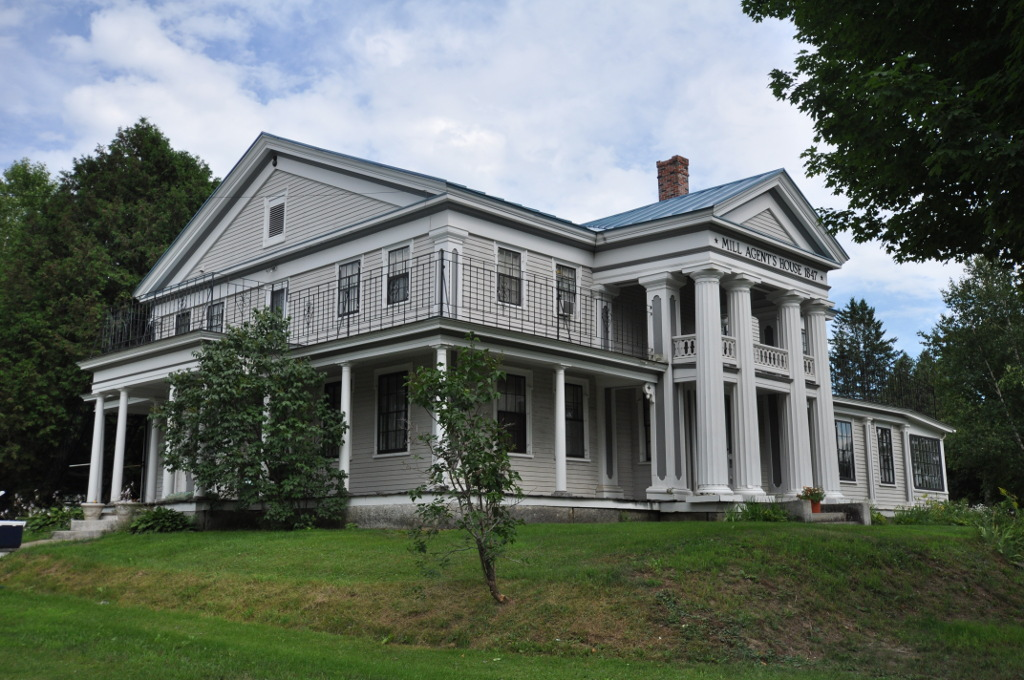

- Location within Maine Location within the United States
- Location: ME 32 at Priest Hill Rd., North Vassalboro, Maine
- Coordinates: 44°29′10″N 69°37′21″W
- Area: 0.5 acres (0.20 ha)
- Built: 1851
- Architectural style: Greek Revival
- NRHP reference No.: 83003645
- Added to NRHP: October 6, 1983

The Mill Agent's House is a historic house at Maine State Route 32 and Priest Hill Road in North Vassalboro, Maine. Built in 1851 for the manager overseeing the village's textile mill, it is a large and distinctive example of Greek Revival architecture. It was listed on the National Register of Historic Places in 1983.

== Description and history ==
The Mill Agent's House stands in the center of the village of North Vassalboro, on a large landscaped lot at the southeast corner of SR 32 and Priest Hill Road, and diametrically opposite the intersection from the mill complex. It is a 2 1/2-story wood-frame structure, with a gabled roof and clapboard siding. Its main facade faces west, and is dominated by an off-center projecting gabled portico, with Doric columns supporting an entablature and pedimented gable. There are two window bays to the left of the portico, and three to the right. A single-story porch extends across the other portions of the front and around to the north side, where there is a secondary facade facing Priest Hill Road. The right side of the porch on the main facade has been enclosed, and the supports on the left portion are replacement Colonial Revival columns.

The North Vassalboro Manufacturing Woolen Company was founded in 1836, and built this house in 1851 for Thomas Lang, son of the founder and the overseeing agent for the operation. The house was sold by the mill ownership in 1955, and served for a time as a nursing home before becoming a private residence.

== See also ==
- National Register of Historic Places listings in Kennebec County, Maine
