= The Lincolnshire =

Historic house in Massachusetts, United States

- U.S. National Register of Historic Places
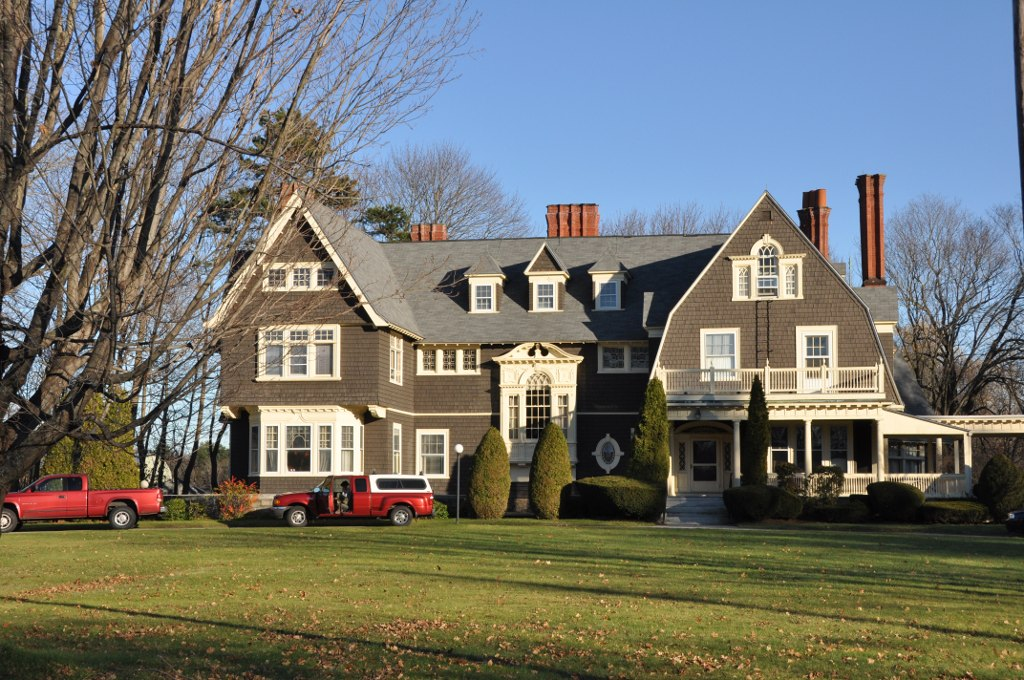

- Location within Massachusetts Location within the United States
- Location: Andover, Massachusetts
- Coordinates: 42°38′25″N 71°7′58″W
- Built: 1897
- Architect: Merrill & Cutler
- Architectural style: Colonial Revival
- MPS: Town of Andover MRA
- NRHP reference No.: 82004804
- Added to NRHP: June 10, 1982

The Lincolnshire is a grand mansion at 22 Hidden Road and 28 Hidden Way in Andover, Massachusetts, United States.

== History ==
The mansion was built between 1897 and 1898 for Henry Bradford Lewis (1868-1951), who made a considerable fortune from his scouring mills in Lawrence. Lewis was in charge of the three mills of the E. Frank Lewis Co. and the American Lanolin Co., which employed 500 persons at their peak.

The architects of the house were Merrill & Cutler of Lowell. It was formerly attributed to George G. Adams of Lawrence, who designed a similar mansion for Lewis' father in that city.

At his death in 1951, Lewis left this house and its greenhouse, to his wife Lillian. The house was too large to be maintained for only one occupant, and the building was sold in 1953 to C. Lincoln Giles and converted into apartments. The carriage house is now a single-family residence.

The mansion was added to the National Register of Historic Places because it is distinguished:

- by its association with a wealthy Lawrence manufacturer
- as an excellent example of around the start of the 20th-century architecture on a grand scale.

== Architecture ==
The house was built in the Colonial Revival style structure with some Palladian and Queen Anne elements, along with ocular windows. It has cross-gambrel pavilions and a small window in an exterior chimney. The original, Colonial Revival carriage house at the rear is similarly large in scale, with wood shingles and a large gambrel roof.

== See also ==
- National Register of Historic Places listings in Andover, Massachusetts
- National Register of Historic Places listings in Essex County, Massachusetts
