= Smith & Dove Co. =

19th century mill founded by abolitionist

The Smith & Dove Co. spun flax into thread and twine for products such as shoes, sail cloth and carpets in mills in Andover, Massachusetts, from 1864 until 1927, when the company was sold to Ludlow Manufacturing.

Smith & Dove was notable for the philanthropy of two of its founders, brothers Peter and John Smith. The latter was an ardent abolitionist and member of the group who started Andover’s Free Christian Church on a principle of “biblical justice” and freedom for all people.

== Early history (pre-1864) ==
John Smith emigrated to the United States via Halifax, Nova Scotia, arriving on Dec. 15, 1816. He worked as a machinist in Watertown and Medway before starting his own business, John Smith & Co., in Plymouth, Massachusetts in 1822.

John Smith and his early business partners, Joseph Faulkner and Warren Richardson, moved their company to Andover in 1824. They built a mill on the east side of the Shawsheen River where they made machinery for the cotton industry. Faulkner and Richardson died in 1829.

In 1835, Smith went into business with his brother, Peter, and his brother’s friend, John Dove. Peter Smith and John Dove had met in Brechin, Scotland, where both worked in flax mills for John Dove’s father. John Smith convinced his brother to follow him to the U.S.

The first mill owned by brothers John and Peter Smith and their business partner, John Dove, was in Andover’s Frye Village (later Shawsheen Village). In 1843 the company moved up the Shawsheen River into the former Abbot Mill.

== Incorporation as Smith & Dove Co. ==
The business incorporated as Smith & Dove Co. in 1864. The company supplied linen thread for boots worn by Union soldiers during the Civil War.

The company's offices were located opposite the Boston & Maine Railroad tracks from the Andover train depot.

The company recruited workers from the founders’ hometown of Brechin, offering low-cost housing and recreation, and by 1896 employed 300 people. The mill complex was surrounded by a vibrant village that included multi-family tenements, athletic fields, small stores and a village school. Most workers walked to their jobs.

Peter Smith died July 6, 1880, at age 77. John Smith died Feb. 25, 1886, at age 89. Both are buried in West Parish Garden Cemetery in Andover.

Peter Dove Smith, son of founder Peter Smith, later served as president of the company and was also an Andover selectman. The younger Smith was also a Civil War veteran, having enlisted in the Andover Company in 1861, at age 19. He was eventually promoted to 2nd Lt., Company G, 1st Massachusetts Heavy Artillery, and lost the two middle fingers of his left hand during the Battle of Spottsylvania. After the war, the younger Smith spent 10 years in Gloucester, where he owned a fish wholesaler, and returned to Andover following his father’s death in 1880.

Peter Dove Smith died Jan. 16, 1911, at age 69. He is also buried in West Parish Garden Cemetery.

The company created a pension for its employees in 1912.

== Later history ==
In 1926, the company reported owning more than 100 houses, charging employees 25 percent less for rent than it charged non-employees. In addition, the company maintained "The Hillside," a boarding house for women workers, which was staffed by a housekeeper and a nurse.

The company promoted itself as “the first factory in America for the manufacture of linen threads.” A 1926 company brochure promoted founders John and Peter Smith, and John Dove, as “founders of the first flax mill in America.” The company at the time made flaxen thread, yarn and twine.

In 1926, the company reported that "changes in the firm name and in the organization have been few" in the 90 years since John Smith went into business with his brother, Peter, and John Dove, and that the original families were "still largely represented in the ownership and management."

Smith & Dove was sold to Ludlow Manufacturing in 1927, and the mills were closed the following year.

The complex was later redeveloped as an office and business complex and is now known as Dundee Park.
