= William Madison Wood =

American businessman

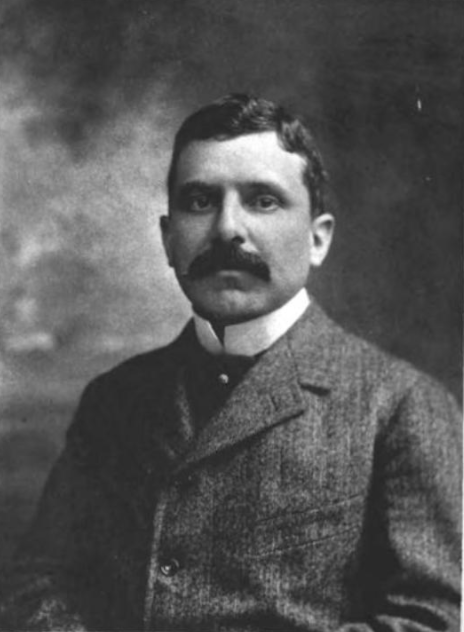
- Born: June 18, 1858; Edgartown, Massachusetts, U.S.
- Died: February 2, 1926 (aged 67); Daytona Beach, Florida, U.S.
- Occupation: Manufacturer
- Spouse: Ellen Ayer (m. 1888)

William Madison Wood (June 18, 1858 – February 2, 1926) was an American textile mill owner of Lawrence, Massachusetts. He made a good deal of his fortune through being hired by mill owners to turn around failing mills and was despised by organized labor.

== Early life and education ==
Wood was born in 1858 in a cottage on Pease Point Way, in Edgartown, Massachusetts, on the island of Martha's Vineyard. His parents, Grace (Emma) Wood and William Wood Sr., were Portuguese immigrants from the Azores, Portugal. His father, William Sr., Guilherme Medeiros Silva was a crewman on a New Bedford whaling ship from 1853 until his death in 1871. (The Portuguese word "silva" translates into English as "wood" or "forest".) William Jr. was only 12 years old when his father died, and had to drop out of school and find a job to provide for his mother and younger siblings. Fortunately for William Wood, Andrew G. Pierce, a wealthy New Bedford textile manufacturer, offered him a job working in his Wamsutta Cotton Mill.

Pierce soon saw that hiring young William would prove to be extremely beneficial. Pierce was impressed with Wood's work and promoted him to the manufacturing department, where he learned cost structures and figures. At the age of eighteen, Wood left New Bedford for Philadelphia. With the help of Andrew Pierce, William was able to find a good job with a Philadelphia' brokerage firm, where he learned about stocks and bonds. He later returned to New Bedford, and worked at a bank. According to the Dukes County Intelligencer, when a Fall River textile company went bankrupt, its new manager hired William as paymaster. Then, in 1885, the Washington Mill in Lawrence went bankrupt and was purchased by Frederick Ayer of Lowell. Frederick Ayer and his brother James Cook Ayer were successful patent medicine producers.

== American Woolen Company ==
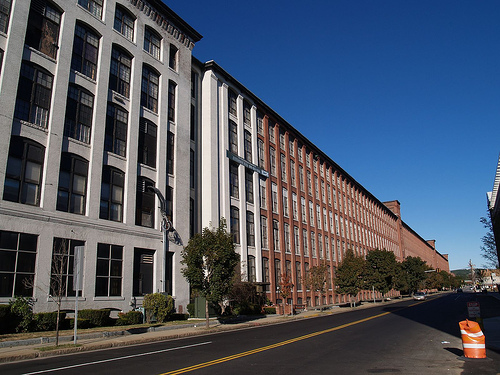
Wood Mill, Lawrence, named for William

Ayer was a multi-millionaire but knew nothing about the textile industry. This is when Ayer's new manager convinced Wood to leave his previous position and be his assistant in charge of manufacturing. A short time later, Wood was promoted to treasurer, and four years later he was made manager. Wood was then making a substantial amount of money for the time, around $25,000 a year. Within three years of his promotion, William Wood married Ayer's daughter Ellen, eventually making him a brother-in-law to General George S. Patton in 1888. Ellen was well educated; she studied at a finishing school in France and then attended Radcliffe College in Cambridge, Massachusetts. Wood was determined to make the Washington Mill a success for himself and his newly acquired family. Wood did make the Washington Mill a success and decided to move on to bigger goals. He set out to merge some of the small, struggling mills of New England into one mammoth money-making company, his company. By 1899, William Wood had convinced seven such mills to join what he called "The Woolen Trust". In April of that same year the company was incorporated under a new name, the American Woolen Company. Frederick Ayer bought half of the shares, and Wood purchased the rest.

== Lawrence textile strike ==
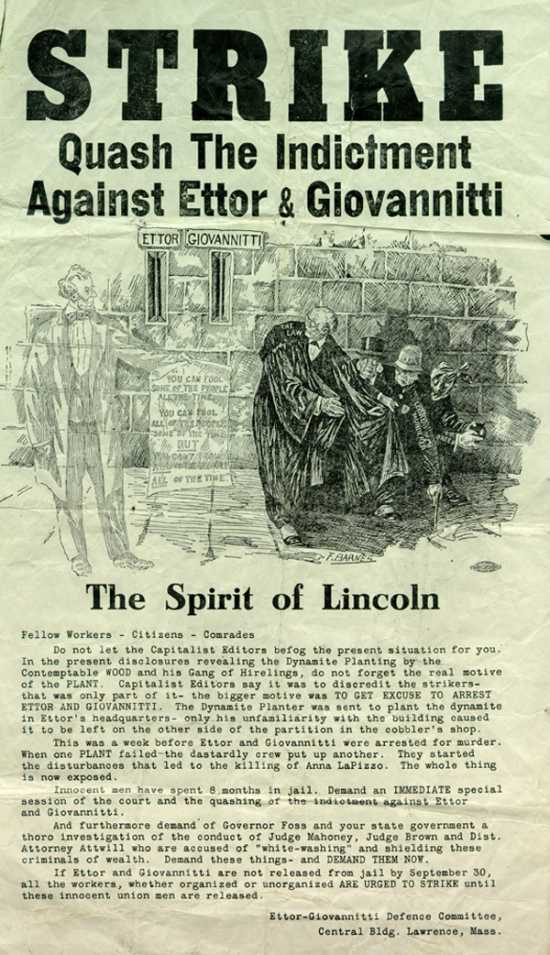
A strike pamphlet, September 1912

In 1912, the Lawrence Mill workers, organized and backed by the union, IWW, went on strike. William Wood was required to shorten the work week for all employees. He did cut the work week from fifty-six hours to fifty-four hours, but he also increased the speed at which the looms ran in order to keep from losing profits. The workers were angry that they were working just as hard and producing just as much as they would in a fifty-six-hour week, but only getting paid for fifty-four hours.

During the strike, the police found explosives in three different places along the mills. Meanwhile, Wood settled with the strikers, giving them time and a quarter for overtime and thirty cents more a week to piece-workers. The problem was solved for the moment, but the authorities were looking into the explosives. Eventually, by tracing the serial numbers on the dynamite, the authorities received a confession from the mill contractor, Ernest Pittman. He told them that he and another man, John Breen, had planted the explosives to implicate the IWW. Since they were both employed by William Wood, Wood was indicted for conspiracy to destroy the mills. After a long trial, the grand jury found William Wood not guilty on June 6, 1913.

== Later in life ==
=== Prosecution and acquittal ===
On May 26, 1920 the American Woolen Company of Massachusetts, the American Woolen Company of New York, and William M. Wood were indicted under the Lever Act for profiteering the Department of Justice. One newspaper described Wood's practices as "bold profiteering, nothing else", and was arguably the most infamous business owner in the textile industry at the time. According to the DOJ, William Wood and the companies profits amounted to 300-400%.

After staging a 40 piece brass band of his employees for his arrival at Arden in the American Woolen Co.'s company town of Shawsheen Village, Willaim Wood then exclaimed during it “You can never know how fully I appreciate this expression of your loyalty" and thanked them for their 'support' against the DOJ prosecution. However, George Soule who interviewed Wood's employees found their sentiments to be different:

“the workers are tired of pretending Mr. Wood is popular. On several occasions they have been taken out of the mills on full pay during working hours, and Mobilized with brass bands for demonstrations of welcome, or what not, for Mr. Wood, who has entered the city . . . like a little king greeting his loyal subjects.”

As defense against the prosecution, Defense attorney Charles Evan Hughes Jr. questioned the constitutionality of the Lever act and claimed the act didn't apply to raw cloth since it wasn't wearing apparel as defined in the bill. The judge eventually ruled in favor of the company. Afterwards which Wood staged another worker parade to celebrate.

Reportedly the outrage over this ruling was so high, that many wool orders were canceled by Wood's buyers. However this could also be attributed to the general draw-down of industry after WW1. In response to which Woods temporarily closed a number of mills, laying off masses of textile workers. Which the ACW highly criticized as using the case outcome as an excuse to close plants in order to slash labor costs. Several months later the American Woolen company would force their employees to accept significant wage cuts. Cuts which would eventually lead to the 1922 New England Textile Strike.

=== Later ===
Moving on with his life, William made big plans for his company's headquarters at Shawsheen Village, Massachusetts. This meant moving from the previous location in Lawrence. The entire project took about five years from 1918 to 1923. Wood transformed a quiet residential community into a self-sufficient neighborhood for his employees; it included industrial, residential and recreational facilities. During those years, the First World War kept the woolen industry alive. Wood was swamped with Army contracts that helped his company grow. By 1924, the company owned sixty mills and employed over 40,000 people. In 1924, William Wood suffered a stroke. His doctor advised him to retire and rest. Taking his doctors advice, William Wood retired and named Andrew Pierce Jr. his successor. Pierce Jr. was the son of the man who gave Wood his first job. In January 1926, he and his wife Ellen moved to Florida. He committed suicide in Daytona Beach on February 2, 1926.

After Wood's death, his fortune became the subject of a major U.S. Supreme Court decision on the interpretation of the income tax laws. In the case of Old Colony Trust Co. v. Commissioner, 279 U.S. 716 (1929), Chief Justice William Howard Taft held that where a third party (in this case, American Woolen Co.) pays the income tax owed by an individual, the amount of tax paid constitutes additional taxable income to that individual. The executors of his will therefore had to pay the back taxes on his estate.

== Sports owner ==
Wood owned the Shawsheen Indians which won the 1924–25 National Challenge Cup. In June 1925, the Indians entered the American Soccer League. Following Wood's death, the Indians withdrew from the league and folded.

== See also ==
- Cuttyhunk - Wood and family had two homes on the island now known as Avalon and Winter House.
