= Shawsheen Village Historic District =

Historic district in Massachusetts, United States

- U.S. National Register of Historic Places
- U.S. Historic district
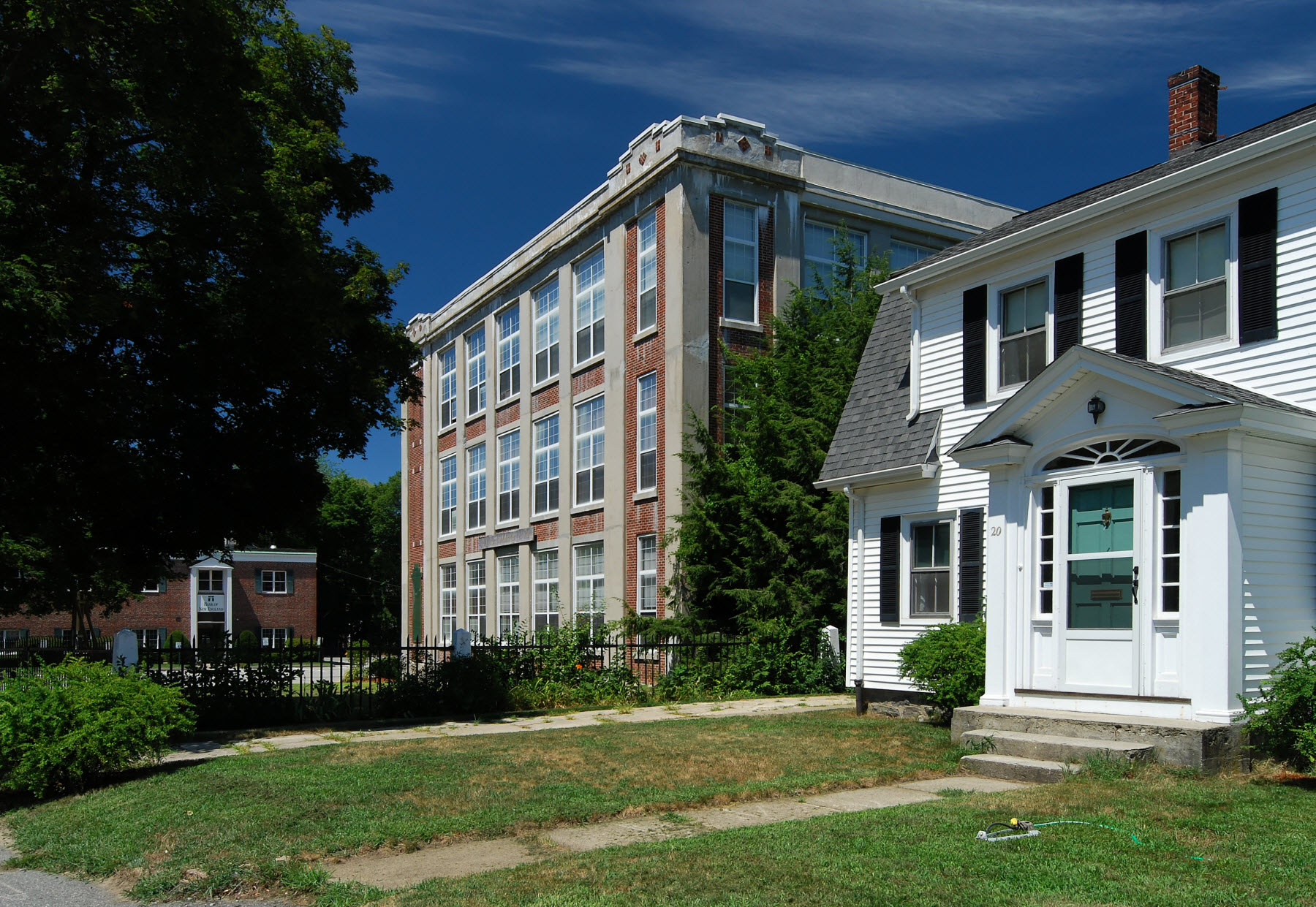
- A house and factory building in Shawsheen Village

- Location within Massachusetts Location within the United States
- Location: Andover, Massachusetts
- Coordinates: 42°40′22″N 71°8′51″W
- Built: 1919
- Architect: multiple
- Architectural style: Colonial Revival, Tudor Revival
- NRHP reference No.: 79000328
- Added to NRHP: February 9, 1979

Shawsheen Village Historic District is a historic district in northern Andover, Massachusetts. Shawsheen Village was completed in the early 1920s as a planned corporate community. Conceived by William Madison Wood of the American Woolen Company, the village was designed a team of architects, including Adden & Parker, Clifford Allbright and Ripley & LeBoutillier of Boston and James E. Allen of Lawrence. John Franklin, a civil engineer for the American Woolen Company, was responsible for designing the village, under the direction of Wood. Buildings from the original Frye Village were also incorporated into the design, which included a railroad station, shops, apartment buildings, factories, parks and numerous single-family dwellings. The village was located about 21/2 miles (4 km) south of the company's main factories in nearby Lawrence.

The village was roughly divided into three sections. The westernmost of these sections, around the junction of Main Street (Massachusetts Route 28) with Massachusetts Route 133 (Lowell Street to the west, Haverhill Street to the east), was the village center, with shops, a post office. Immediately east of this area, descending to the Shawsheen River, was the industrial area. One residential area was primarily north and west of this central area, and it provided housing for the upper level executives of the Company. The third area was east and south of the industrial area, spilling across the railroad tracks and river, where middle class worker housing was provided. Sprinkled throughout were old houses from the Frye Village settlement that were relocated according to Wood's vision.

Although the company community was well conceived, it was short-lived. William Wood committed suicide in 1926, and the single ownership strategy of the community began to fall apart. Most of the company's properties were purchased by a realty trust in 1932 and resold, often to the tenants of the property. The district was listed on the National Register of Historic Places in 1979.

== See also ==
- Ballardvale District
- Andover Village Industrial District
- National Register of Historic Places listings in Andover, Massachusetts
- National Register of Historic Places listings in Essex County, Massachusetts
