= Bedford Public Schools =

Bedford Public Schools can refer to:

- Bedford Central School District, a school district in Mount Kisco, New York
- Bedford County Public Schools, a school district in Bedford County, Virginia
- Bedford Public Schools (Massachusetts), a school district in Bedford, Massachusetts
- Bedford Public Schools (Michigan), a school district in Bedford, Michigan
- New Bedford Public Schools, a school district in New Bedford, Massachusetts
