= Vine Brook =

Brook in Middlesex County, Massachusetts, United States

Coordinates: 42.507°N 71.250°W

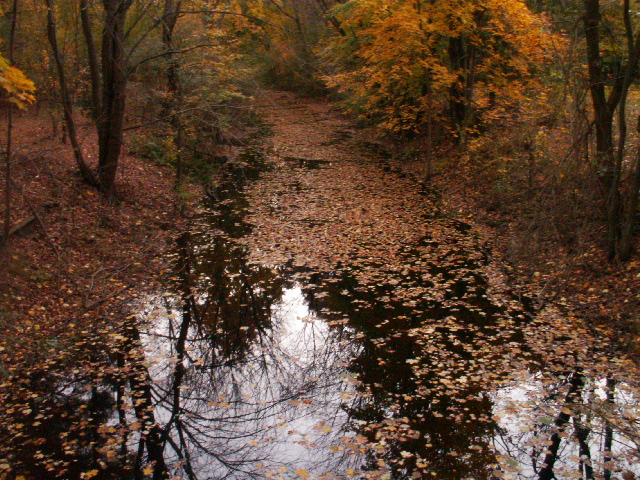

Location
- Country: United States
- State: Massachusetts
- District: Middlesex County
- Cities: Lexington, Burlington, Bedford

Physical characteristics
- Source: Spring near the "Old Reservoir"
  - location: Old Reservoir Park, Marrett Road, Lexington
- Mouth: Shawsheen River
  - location: Bedford
- Discharge
  - location: Shawsheen River, Bedford

Basin features
- Tributaries
  - right: Upper Vine Brook, Long Meadow Brook

Vine Brook is a brook in Middlesex County, Massachusetts. According to the History of Bedford, Vine Brook is "an important tributary of Shawsheen River." The book also states it as an excellent source of water-power in the 17th to 19th centuries.

Vine Brook flows from the "Old Reservoir," at a public park off Marrett Road in Lexington, then meets Upper Vine Brook (one of its tributaries), then continues northward through Lexington Centre, through Butterfield's Pond on the Lexington–Burlington border, underneath the Middlesex Mall and Burlington Mall (in a culvert), remaining northward and parallel to the Middlesex Turnpike for a ways, then meets Long Meadow Brook (one of its tributaries), then part of it branches off to form Sandy Brook, then continues to flow northwesterly over the Burlington–Bedford border, to Route 3 at Burlington Road, then crosses over Rte. 3 to an old millpond, and empties into the Shawsheen River. (The Shawsheen, in turn, empties into the Merrimack River, which then empties into the Atlantic Ocean.)

Vine Brook is one of the best-known water features in Lexington, and is closely identified with the histories of Lexington and Burlington, due to the several mills which once operated on its banks. The brook lends its name to many local streets and developments. Several segments of the brook, in all three towns it passes through, are parts of town-owned conservation land parks.

== Tributaries ==
Vine Brook has two major tributaries.

- Upper Vine Brook. Source: wetlands off Marrett Road, primarily to eastern side of Kendall Road, Lexington. This tributary, in modern times, is often mistakenly assumed to be the main channel of Vine Brook.
- Long Meadow Brook. Source: between Indian Hill Road and Arlington Road, Burlington.

== Branches ==
Vine Brook has one secondary branch.

- Sandy Brook. Just past the Burlington Mall (going downstream), a branch breaks off Vine Brook to form Sandy Brook.

== General history ==
Before the first white settlers came around the 1630s, the Indians had formed no permanent settlement near Vine Brook in Lexington, as the water supply was not great enough for an entire tribe. However, towards the Shawsheen River there were settlements, as that was certainly a greater body of water. (While Vine Brook was small in those days, though, it did have fish.)

When the first settlement was made at Lexington c. 1642, it was near Vine Brook.

As can be seen in the next section, there was a great use of the Brook for mills, from the 17th to 19th centuries.

In the early 20th century, however, the practical use of the Brook switched to irrigation for neighboring farms, as Lexington was still very much a farming community up to around the 1950s. In the 1930s, as part of a WPA project, the Brook was widened and deepened from its original shallow, narrow bed from Hayes Lane to Emerson Road, all in Lexington. This was to better use it for irrigation purposes. (Today, much of the brook bed is reverting to its natural size, gradually filling back in with silt.) In addition, it was culverted from Hayes Lane back upstream to Vine Brook Road in Lexington.

Today, a great deal of the Brook is on town-owned conservation land parks. Though many sections of the Brook have had their appearance altered over the years, some areas still remain relatively as they were in the Colonial days and before.

== Mills ==
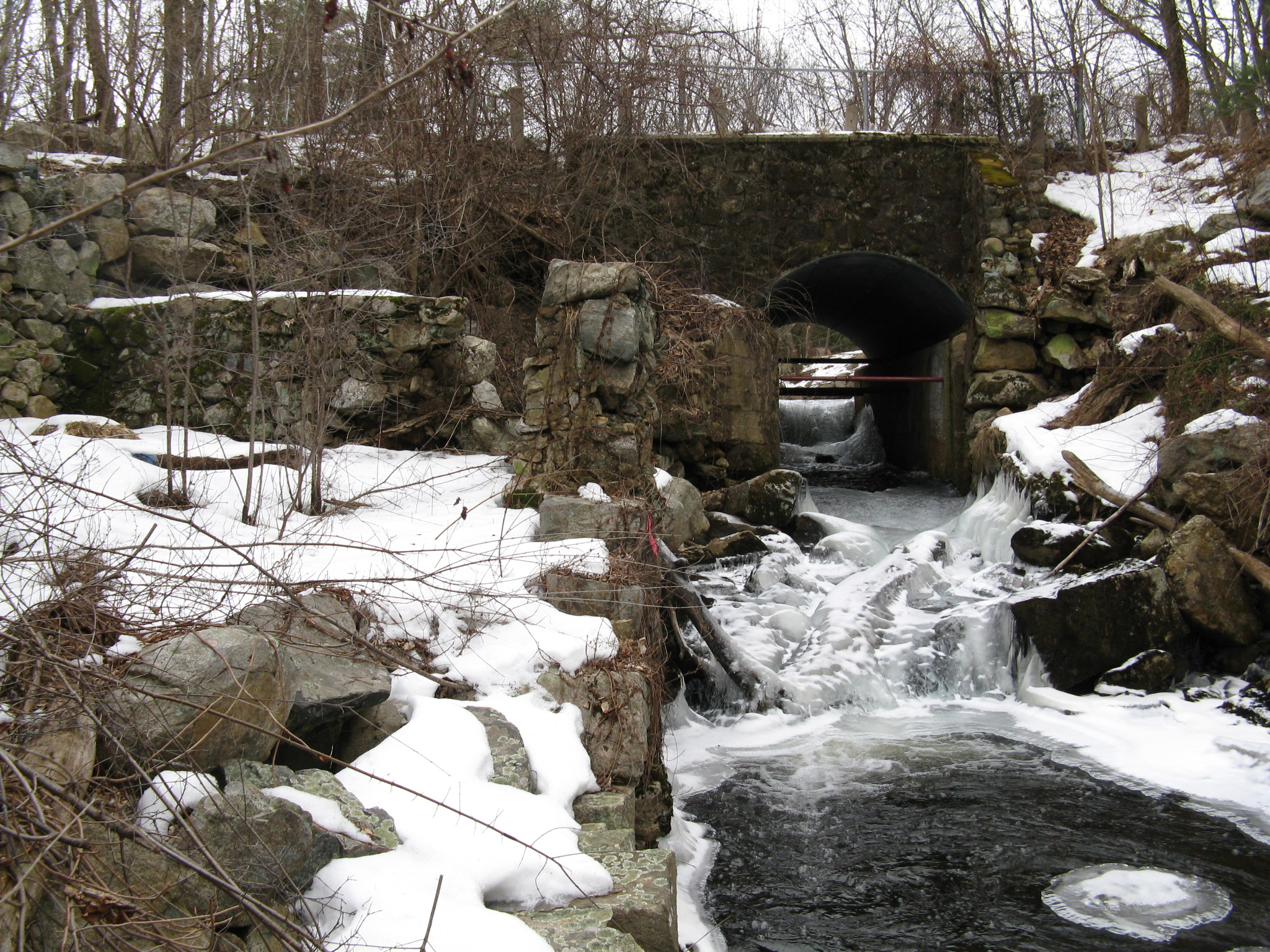
Ruins of Wilson Mill in Bedford

There have been several mills on Vine Brook over the centuries, and it is this industry that has so connected the brook to the towns it passes through. According to the History of Bedford, at the time it was written, "the only motive-powers, utilized [at that time in Bedford] are on the Shawshine River and Vine Brook." According to the Bedford town website, when Bedford was being incorporated as a separate town from Billerica, there were negotiations as to which town would retain rights to the Vine Brook area, due to its valuable water-power. Following are known mills listed in downstream order, with locations, and dates if known:

- Muzzey mill, date unknown. Approximate site: today's 1666 Mass. Ave., Lexington.
- Estabrook mill, date unknown. Approximate site: rear of today's 1625 Mass. Ave., Lexington. The millpond created as a result of this mill was used afterwards (19th century) for baptisms by the First Baptist Church of Lexington.
- Wyman fulling mill, before 1794. Exact site: at Butterfield's Pond and North Street, Lexington, opposite today's 113 North Street. (See Gibbs mill, below.)
- Gibbs mill, on same site as Wyman fulling mill (see above). Burned 1840s. Foundations still visible.
- Locke grist mill, before 1794. Exact site: at Butterfield's Pond and Lowell Street, just over the town line into Burlington.
- Reed saw mill, before 1794. Still existent in the 1890s. Approximate site: off Middlesex Turnpike, between Adams Street and Route 128, Burlington.
- Vine Brook Mill, originally c. 1645, rebuilt twice afterwards. The first mill was the Bacon mill; this was burned by Indians in King Philip's War. Then came the Wilson corn mill, built 1685, and later used by the Blodgets and Gleasons. It was apparently this mill that Ashbys and Fitches used as well. And then, c. 1840, a paper mill was built on the site. According to the History of Bedford, this mill produced coarse paper and employed many people. When the mill burned (c. 1850–1860), the second mill to burn on that site, about one tenth of the town's residents moved away. The millpond created by this mill is still visible today. Exact site: foundations still visible off Burlington Road, Bedford, near corner of Route 3.
- Saw Mill(s): the History of Bedford also mentions saw mills located on both the Shawsheen River and Vine Brook; specific locations or other details are not mentioned. These mills created millponds which were used for cutting ice. (In addition, ice was cut from Butterfield's Pond by Wyman's Mill.)

== Conservation lands ==
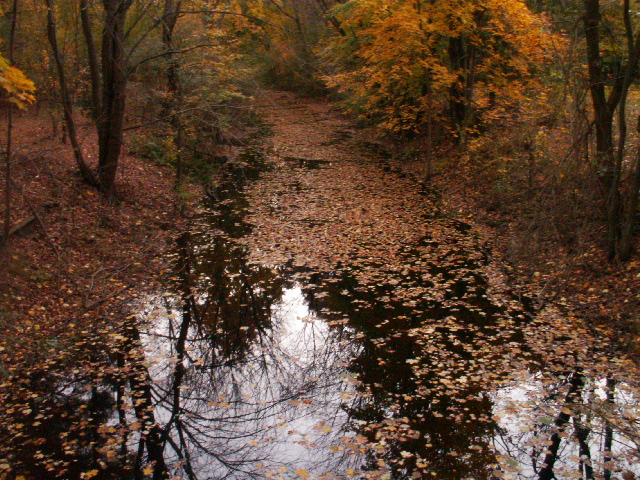
Although Vine Brook no longer flows in its original bed in Lexington, it provides attractive views

Many stretches of Vine Brook are owned by their respective towns, as conservation land. This body of water is vital to the wildlife of its respective towns; The Bedford town website notes that the old millpond at Vine Brook and Route 3 "is one of the few open bodies of water in Bedford and supplements an important wildlife habitat corridor along Route 3 which supports a diverse wildlife population." Following is a list of conservation areas that include sections of the Brook.

- Lexington: there are two parcels of conservation land in Lexington which touch on parts of Vine Brook. Lower Vine Brook is about 100 acres (0.40 km^{2}), and can be accessed from the end of Utica Street; this parcel is bordered for a good stretch by a paved bikeway along the Brook. The Upper Vine Brook parcel encompasses some of Upper Vine Brook, one of the tributaries to the main Vine Brook; this parcel is about 50 acres (0.20 km^{2}), and can be accessed from Highland Avenue.
- Burlington: a section of Vine Brook, near where Sandy Brook breaks off from it, is today a conservation land park owned by the Town of Burlington (22 acres). Further upstream on Sandy Brook is another town-owned park (5 acres). In addition, there is another town-owned park (3.78 acres) off Chadwick Road, that touches on part of Sandy Brook. There is conservation land at part of Long Meadow Brook, a tributary of Vine Brook. There is also the "Muller Road Conservation Land" (over 3 acres), which sits just behind Vine Pond. (Vine Pond is connected, and sits next to, Vine Brook.)
- Bedford: a large section of the Shawsheen River is town-owned conservation land, not far from where Vine Brook empties into the River. Small boats can be used in the Shawsheen.

== Etymology and spelling ==
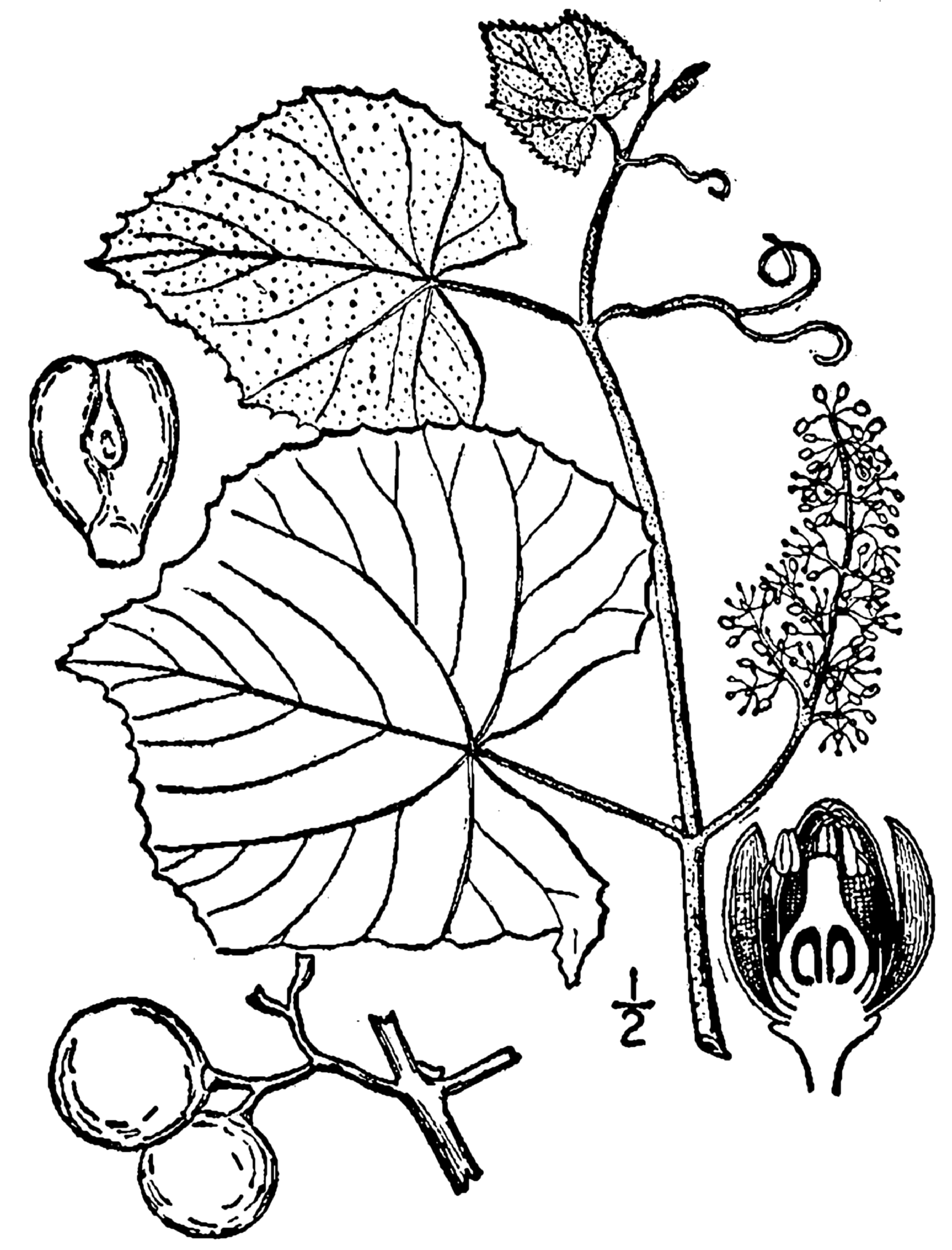
Vitis labrusca, or "Fox Grape."

In 1636 is the first deed reference to land that is now Lexington. It granted 600 acres (2.4 km^{2}) of upland and meadow to a Mr. Harlackenden of Cambridge, at "Vynebrooke."

Vine Brook probably took its name from grape vines growing by its banks. John Josselyn (in his "New England's Rarities") and other writers from the 17th century (such as William Wood in his "New England's Prospect") noted the abundance of grape vines, primarily in low, wet areas.

The type of grape that probably grew at Vine Brook was Vitis labrusca, or "Fox Grape." These same 17th-century authors noted the great size of these grapes (nearly four inches around in some cases), and enjoyed the sweet flavor. There are still a few grape vines which grow at the Brook's bank in Lexington today, on conservation land.

It is quite probable that there was an ancient Indian name for this brook, though it is not known. The Nipmuck Indians were frequent passers-through in the Vine Brook area, though they had no permanent settlement there. A loose translation of "Vine Brook" into Natick Algonquin would be "Wenonis Seep," literally grapevine river.

== Flooding ==
The brook would frequently flood Waltham Street, Lexington, in the Colonial days. The residents of the Southwest part of town would complain that they could not get to "meeting," or church.

March 14 and 15, 2010, has seen the only major flood in recent years. North Street in Lexington was nearly submerged, and Vine Brook's swelling contributed to major flooding on the Shawsheen River.

== Bibliography ==
- Worthen, Edwin B. Tracing the Past in Lexington, Massachusetts. Vantage Books.
- Worthen, Edwin B. Historic Lexington Map Collection. Accessible at Cary Memorial Library, Lexington.

== See also ==
- Lexington, Massachusetts
- Burlington, Massachusetts
- Bedford, Massachusetts
- Middlesex County, Massachusetts
