= Bacon-Gleason-Blodgett Homestead =

Historic house in Massachusetts, United States

- U.S. National Register of Historic Places
- U.S. Historic district – Contributing property
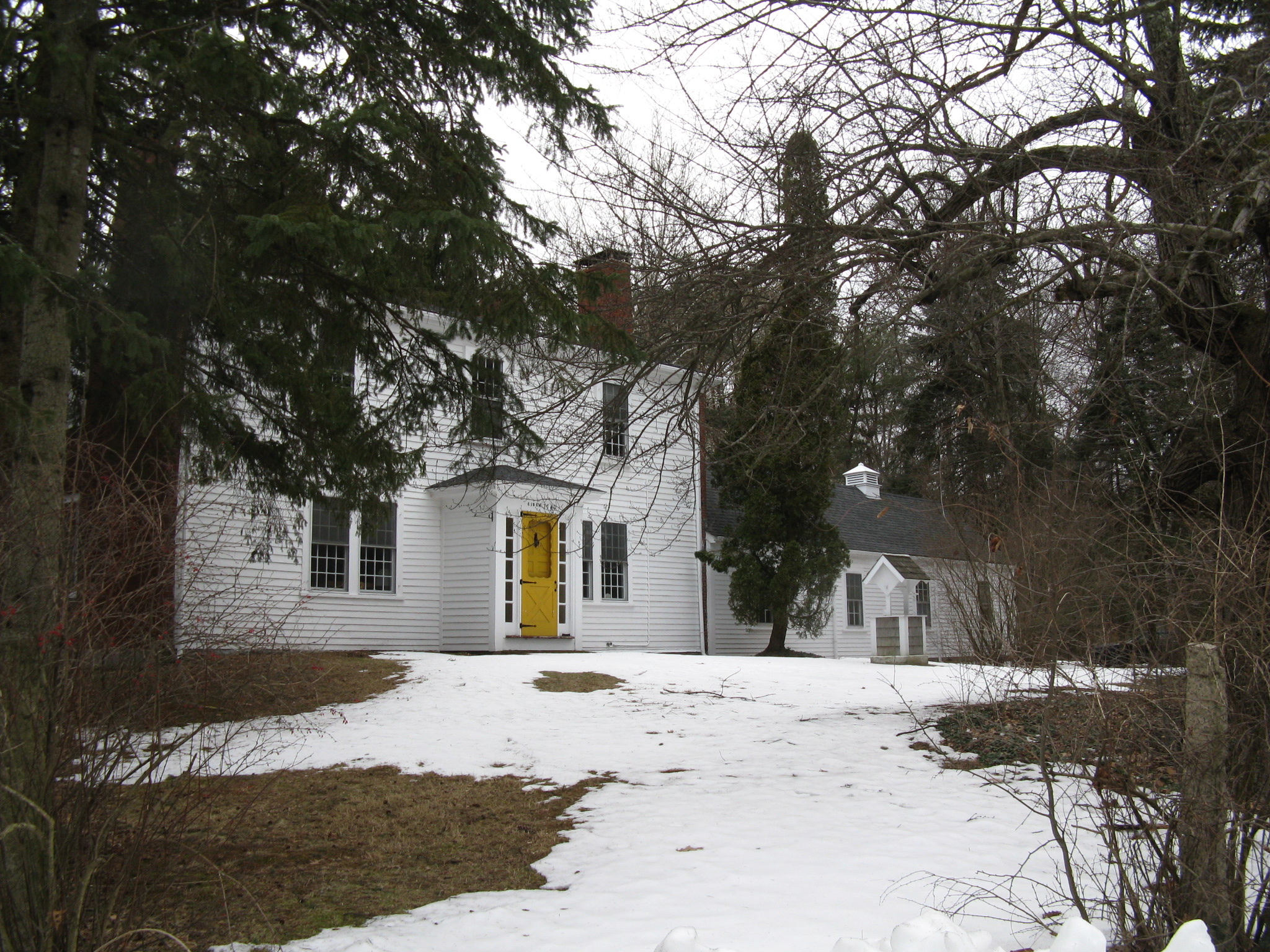
- Bacon-Gleason-Blodgett Homestead

- Location within Massachusetts Location within the United States
- Location: 118 Wilson Rd., Bedford, Massachusetts
- Coordinates: 42°30′1″N 71°14′51″W
- Area: less than one acre
- Built: c. 1740
- Architect: Nathaniel Bacon
- Architectural style: Georgian, Federal
- Part of: Wilson Mill-Old Burlington Road District (ID03000792)
- NRHP reference No.: 77000166

Significant dates
- Added to NRHP: April 14, 1977
- Designated CP: August 18, 2003

The Bacon-Gleason-Blodgett Homestead is a historic house at 118 Wilson Road in Bedford, Massachusetts. Built about 1740, it is the town's only surviving example of a brick-end colonial-period house, with long association to a nearby gristmill. The house was listed on the National Register of Historic Places on April 14, 1977, and included in the Wilson Mill-Old Burlington Road District on August 18, 2003.

== Description and history ==
The Bacon-Gleason-Blodgett Homestead is located in eastern Bedford, near the town line with Burlington. It is set at the southwest corner of Wilson Road and Old Burlington Road; the latter is an old alignment of the main east–west road, now Massachusetts Route 62 which runs a short way to the north. It is a 2 1/2-story wood-frame structure, with a low-pitch hip roof and clapboarded exterior. Its two side walls are brick, each with two interior chimneys. The main facade is three bays wide, with paired sash windows flanking the center entrance on the ground floor, and single sash windows on the second floor. The entry is sheltered by a gable-roofed vestibule. The house has retained significant internal woodwork from the 18th century.

The house was built c. 1740 by Nathaniel Bacon, and is a well-preserved transitional Georgian-Federal style house. Bacon, along with the later owners Gleason and Blodgett, farmed and operated the John Wilson gristmill, which was established nearby about 1690. Another 19th-century owner was James Smith Monroe, who operated a paper mill near the Wilson mill site that was a forerunner of a larger operation he later founded in Lawrence.

== See also ==
- National Register of Historic Places listings in Middlesex County, Massachusetts
