= Bedford Center Historic District =

Historic district in Massachusetts, United States

- U.S. National Register of Historic Places
- U.S. Historic district
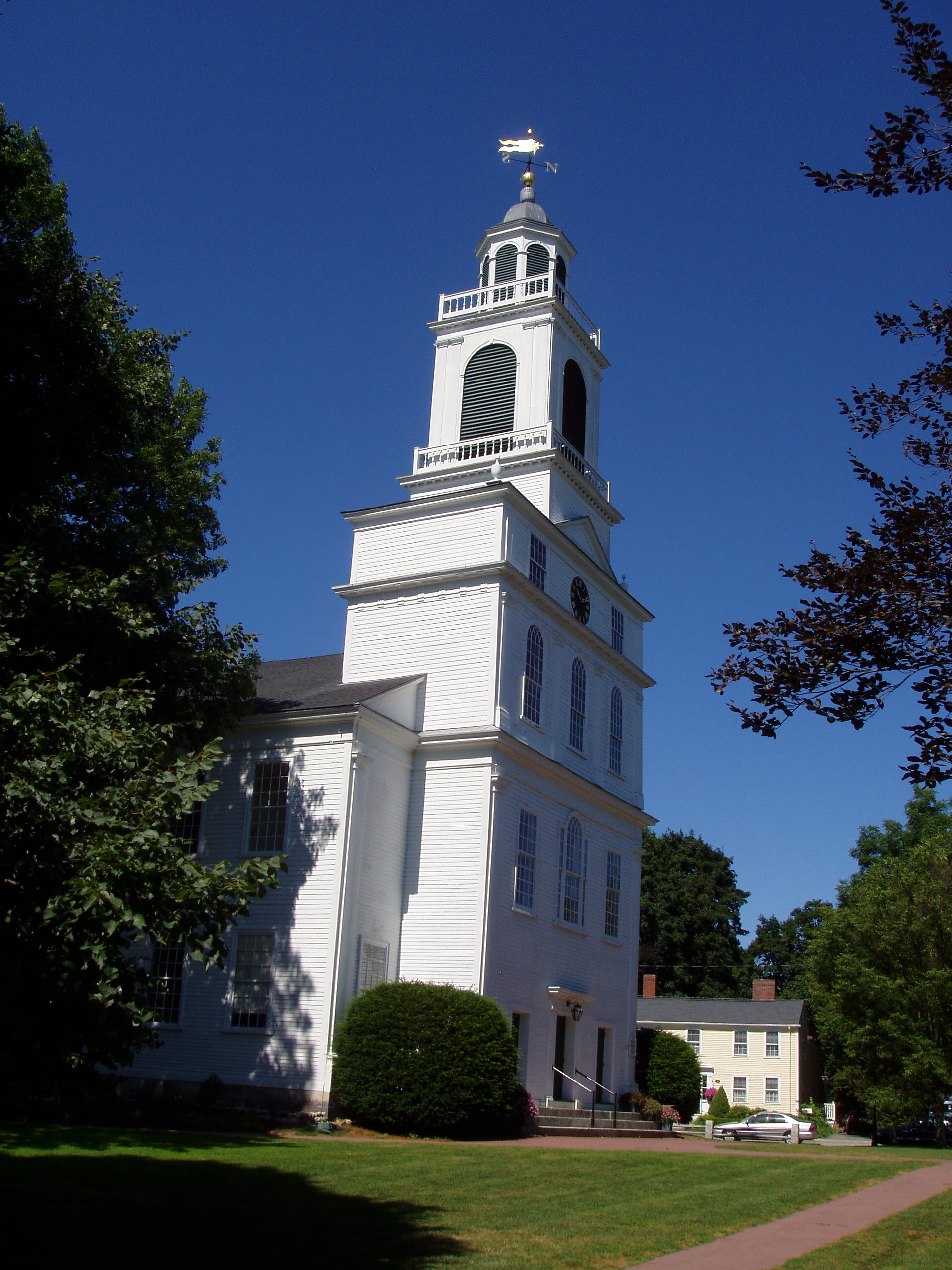

- Location within Massachusetts Location within the United States
- Location: Great Rd. between Bacon and Concord Rds. and adjacent side streets, Bedford, Massachusetts
- Coordinates: 42°29′33″N 71°16′52″W
- Area: 56.15 acres (22.72 ha) (original size); 75 acres (30 ha) (after 2014 amendments)
- Architect: Multiple
- Architectural style: Mid 19th Century Revival, Colonial, Federal
- NRHP reference No.: 77000165 (original); 14000327 (increase)

Significant dates
- Added to NRHP: November 17, 1977
- Boundary increase: June 13, 2014

The Bedford Center Historic District encompasses the historic heart of the town of Bedford, Massachusetts. It extends along Great Road between Bacon and Concord Roads, and includes primarily residential areas on adjacent side streets. The area includes the town's main civic buildings, its first cemetery, and a diverse array of residential architecture spanning more than two centuries. The district was listed on the National Register of Historic Places in 1977; its boundaries were adjusted in 2014 and its period of significance extended.

== Description and history ==
The area that is now Bedford was settled in the 17th century, and was first incorporated as part of Billerica in 1655 before being separately incorporated in 1729, including a portion of neighboring Concord. The town's civic center was at the time of incorporation established near its geographic center, with a colonial meeting house built in 1730 on land donated by early settler Israel Putnam. Its network of major roads developed in part out of early roads connecting Concord and Billerica, with Great Road laid out sometime between 1713 and 1731. The town's first cemetery was established just to its north in 1729, and was the town's only cemetery until 1849.

The oldest building in the district is the Fitch Tavern, built 1710. Most of the buildings in the district were built in the 18th and 19th centuries; there are some modern intrusions, but they are generally stylistically compatible. The centerpiece of the district is Bedford's First Parish Church, a Federal-style church built in 1816, which faces the town common. Also facing the common is Bedford's town hall, which was built in 1857 as a school, and has seen a variety of civic uses before housing town offices. When the district was listed on the National Register in 1977, its period of significance extended to 1927; in 2014, the district underwent boundary adjustments that increased its size by 20 acres (8.1 ha), and extended its period of significance to 1967.

== See also ==
- National Register of Historic Places listings in Middlesex County, Massachusetts
