= Bedford Flag =

Historical American flag

- Use: Other
- Proportion: 27:29
- Design: A crimson background with an armored arm holding a sword coming out of a cloud. A banner surrounds the sword that has the motto "Vince Aut Morire."(Conquer or die)

The Bedford Flag is the oldest known surviving, complete flag in the United States. It is associated with the Minutemen of Bedford, Massachusetts, and the Battles of Lexington and Concord of 1775.

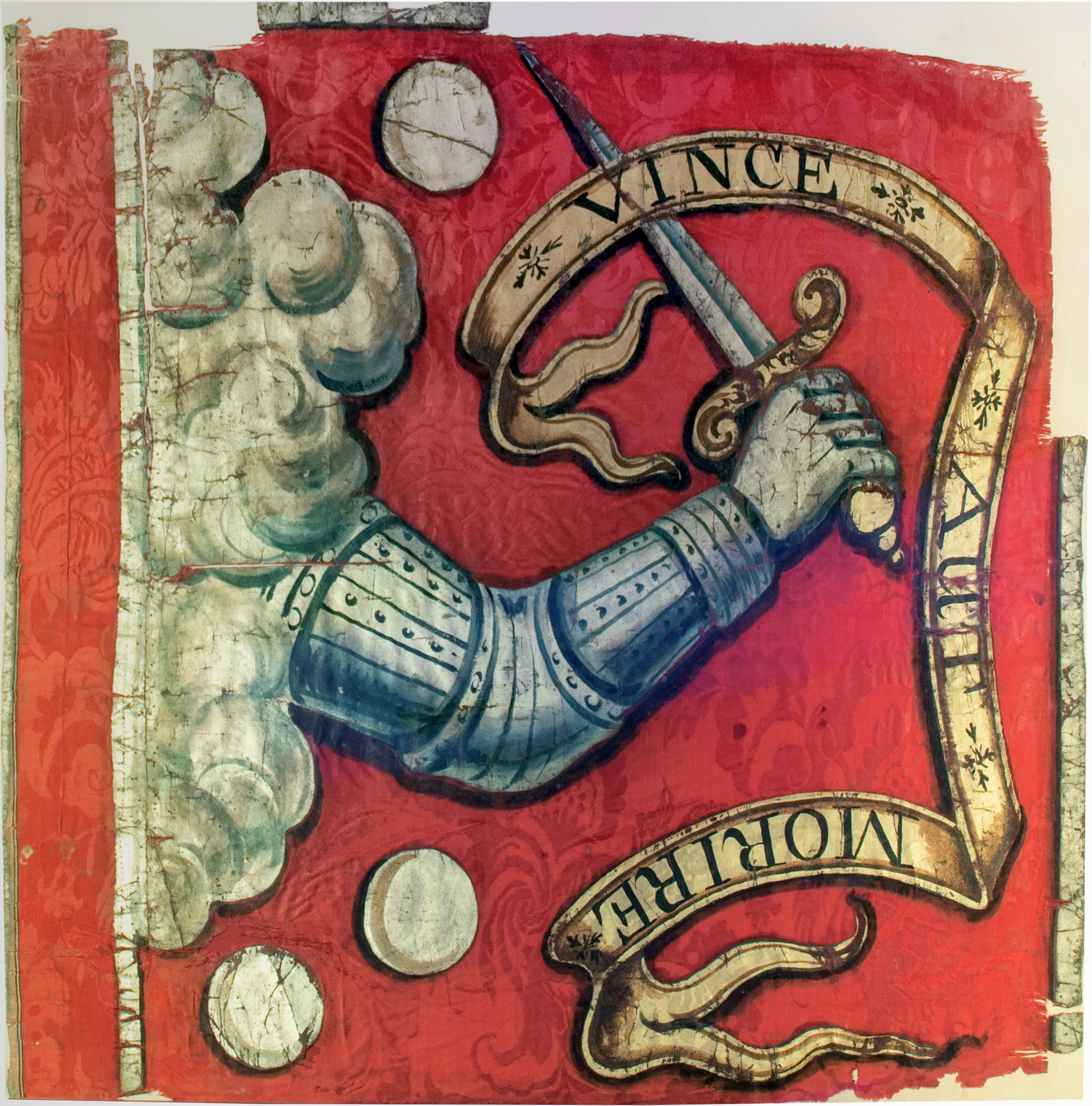
Original 18th century flag, kept in the Bedford Library.

== Construction and design ==
The flag is made of crimson silk damask measuring approximately 27 by 29 inches (69 by 74 cm).

The painted-on design depicts an armored arm grasping a straight sword coming out of a cloud. The two sides are asymmetrical; the sword appears behind the motto on one side and appears in front of it on the other. The Latin motto of "Vince Aut Morire" translates to "Conquer or Die." However, morire is a misspelling of "morere," a second person conjugation of morie. The correct translation is "Vince Aut Morere." The motto reads from top to bottom on one side and from bottom to top on the other.

== Origin ==
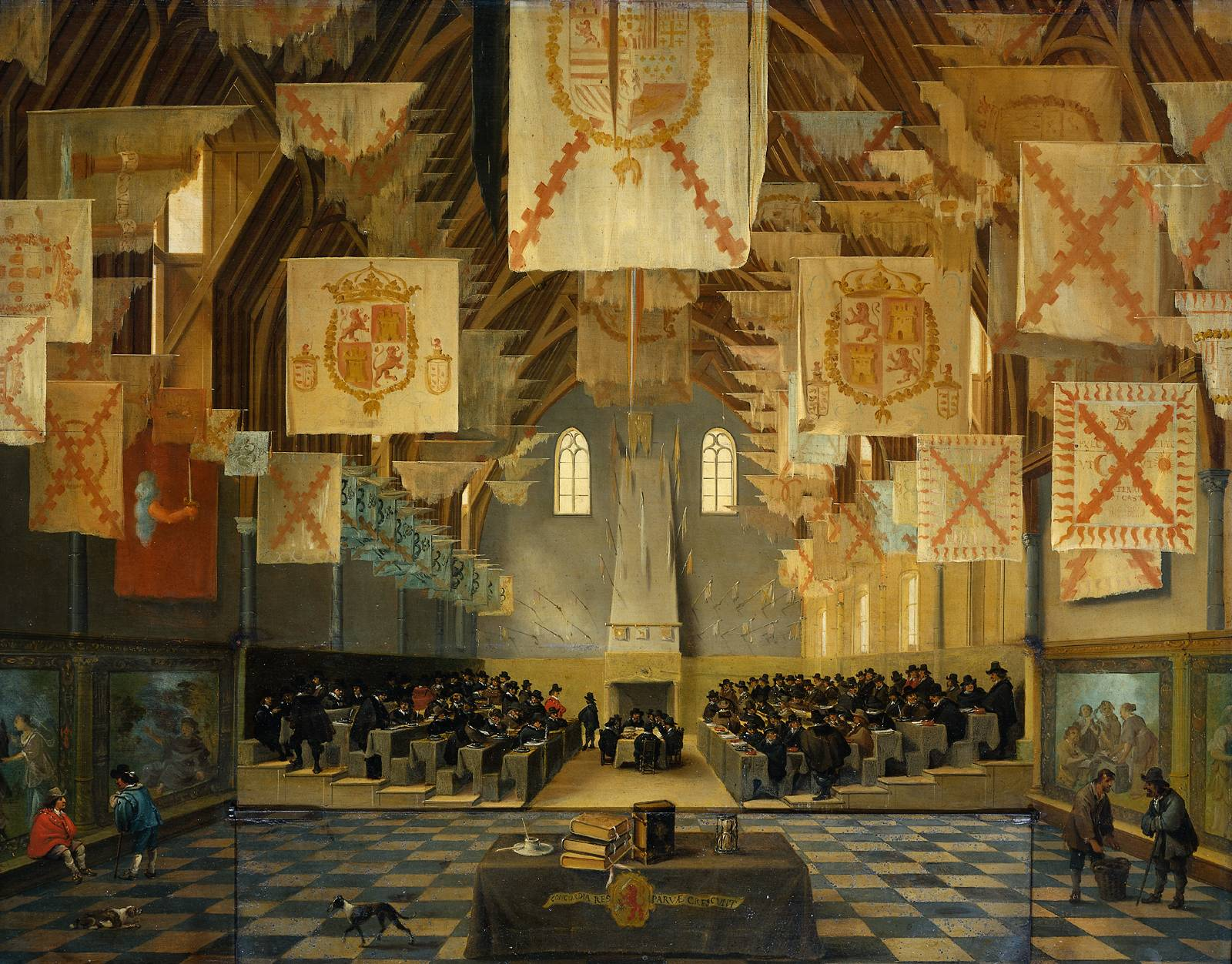
A flag of similar design hangs in the Binnenhof in The Hague circa 1651. The image of an arm holding a sword is common in European heraldry at least as early as the 16th century.

The exact age and origin of the flag are not known, but physical and historical evidence are consistent with a date early in the 18th century. Because of its heraldic similarity to a documented flag made for a Massachusetts cavalry unit in the 1660s, historians thought that the Bedford flag might actually be that earlier flag. However, spectroscopic analysis of the paint revealed the pigment called “Prussian blue”, which did not exist before 1704.

A commission dating to 1737 names Minuteman Nathaniel Page’s father John Page as “Cornett of the Troop of horse”, the officer whose duty it was to bear the unit's flag. Nathaniel’s father, uncle and grandfather are all mentioned within the Bedford and Billerica town records as “Cornet Page”, indicating that a Page could have been carrying a flag for the local militia troop as early as 1720.

== Concord, April 19, 1775 ==
Page family oral tradition, later recounted for historians, held that the Bedford militia's flag was in the custody of the Page family at the time of the American Revolution, and that Nathaniel Page took it into battle at Concord.

There is no documentary evidence, either from testimonies, depositions or diaries written at the time, or in participants' later memoirs, mentioning any such flag flown at the battles of Lexington and Concord by either side. A Lieutenant of the British expedition to Concord noted a liberty pole with a cap and an unknown flag on it standing on a hill near Concord center. British grenadiers chopped down the pole and destroyed the flag.

== As a symbol of the Revolution ==
Unit flags served an important function as a rallying point on the battlefields of the 18th century. With the passage of time, the Bedford flag came to be a political symbol of the early American Revolution and specifically the militia's resistance at Concord.

As the only militia flag present at the battle according to tradition, the flag is the likely inspiration for the opening lines of Ralph Waldo Emerson's Concord Hymn:

By the rude bridge that arched the flood,
Their flag to April’s breeze unfurled,
Here once the embattled farmers stood,
And fired the shot heard round the world.

The first mention of the "Bedford flag" by that name does not come until 1875. Cyrus Page sent the flag to the centennial celebration at Concord on April 19, 1875, and flew it from the old Page homestead for the 1879 Sesquicentennial of Bedford. In 1885, just before his death, he entrusted the flag to the Bedford Free Public Library, where it is still on display.

== Modern use ==
Being its namesake, the Bedford flag is the official flag of Bedford, Massachusetts. The flag is in the care of the Bedford Free Public Library and is available for visitors to view.

== Similar flags ==
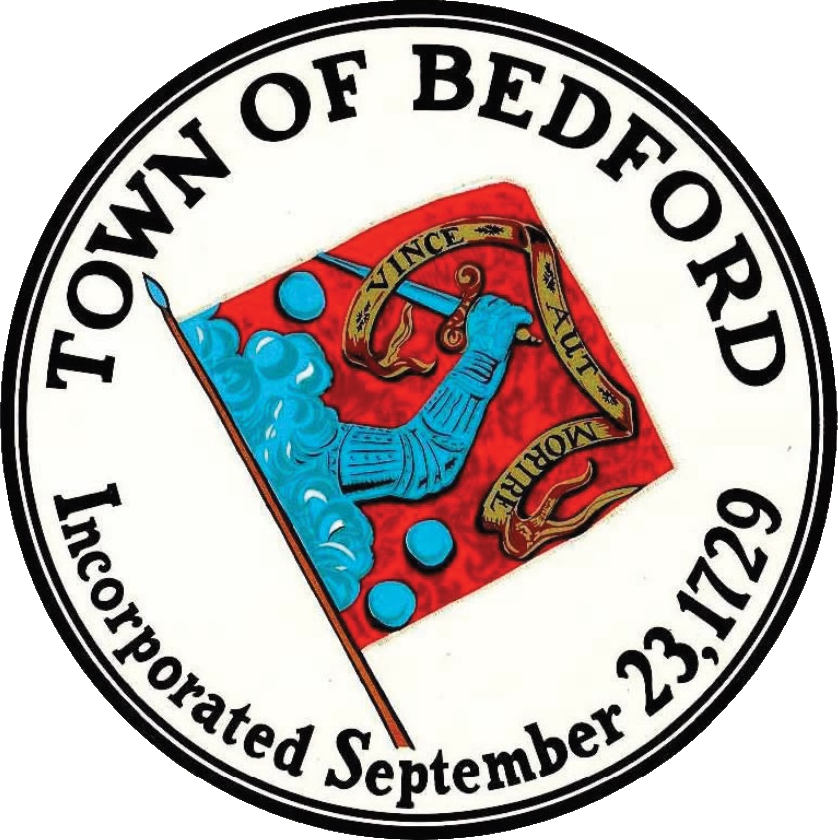
Seal of Bedford, Massachusetts

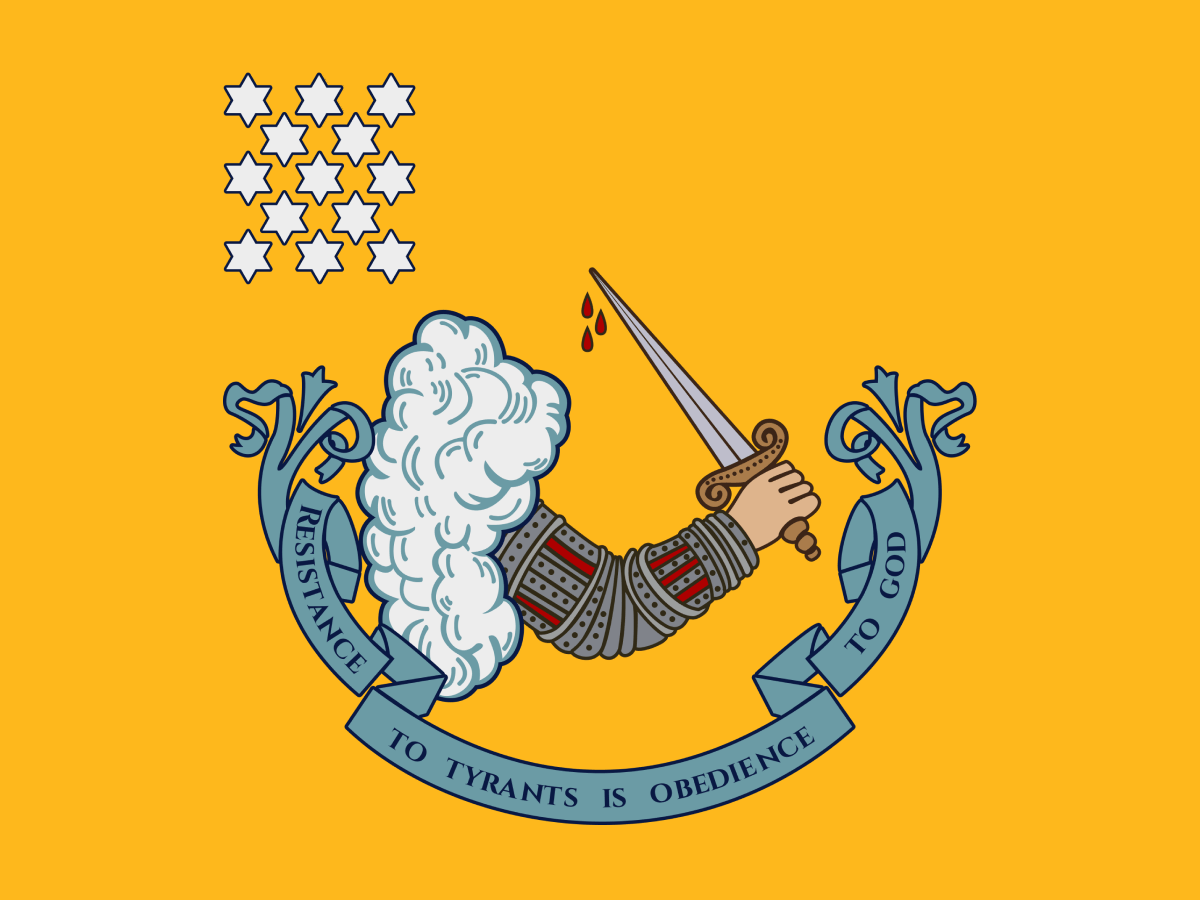
Gostelowe Standard No. 10, a closely related American Revolution flag

Flag flown over the Goliad Declaration of Independence, 1835, utilizing a similar arm with sword design motif

The flag of Massachusetts has a similar arm holding a sword in its design

== See also ==
- Colours, standards and guidons
- Flags of the American Revolutionary War
- 181st Infantry Regiment (United States)
