= Bedford High School (Massachusetts) =

Coordinates: 42.491569°N 71.284916°W

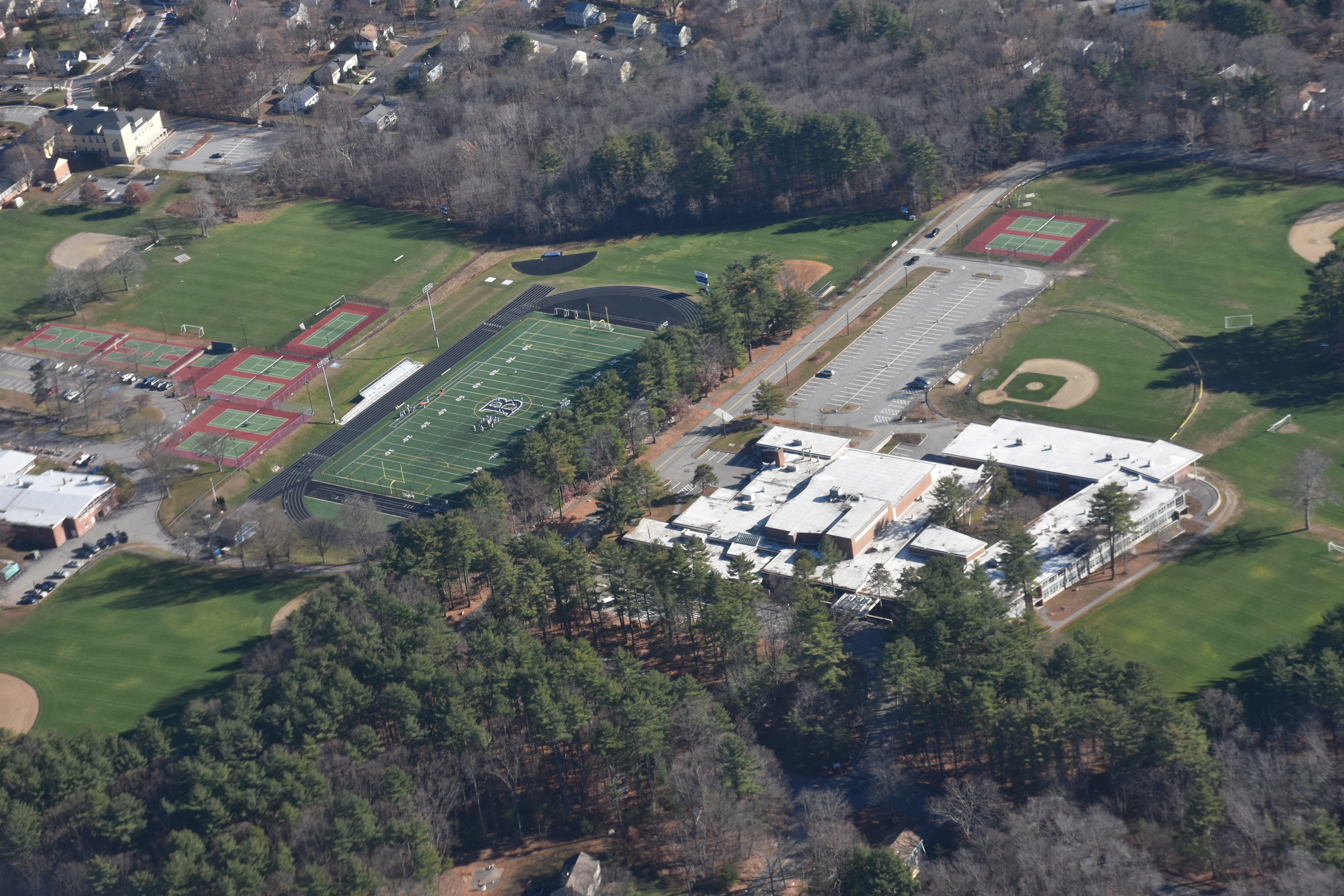
- Aerial view of school campus
- 9 Mudge Way; Bedford, MA 01730; United States

Information
- Type: Public high school
- Motto: “Active learners, resourceful thinkers, effective communicators.”
- Established: 1955
- School district: Bedford Public Schools (Massachusetts)
- Superintendent: Cliff Chuang
- NCES School ID: 250240000128
- Principal: Kim Comeiro
- Teaching staff: 79.39 (FTE)
- Grades: 9 – 12
- Enrollment: 866 (2023-2024)
- Student to teacher ratio: 10.91
- Colors: Blue and White
- Athletics: Soccer, Football, Field Hockey, Cross Country, Volleyball, Wrestling, Basketball, Track, Cheerleading, Rifle, Skiing, Swimming, Tennis, Lacrosse, Ultimate Frisbee, Ice Hockey
- Athletics conference: Dual County League
- Mascot: Buccaneer
- Rival: Concord Carlisle High School, Weston High School
- Newspaper: The Lookout
- DESE School ID: 00230505
- Website: www.bedfordps.org/high-school

Bedford High School is a public high school in Bedford, Massachusetts, United States. It is operated under the authority of the Bedford Public Schools district. Students come primarily from Bedford. Other students that attend Bedford High School come from the neighboring Hanscom Air Force Base or from Boston through the use of the METCO system. Some Bedford students attend Shawsheen Valley Technical High School.

The school takes on-post students from Hanscom Air Force Base, if they are dependents of active duty military personnel.

== Academic information ==
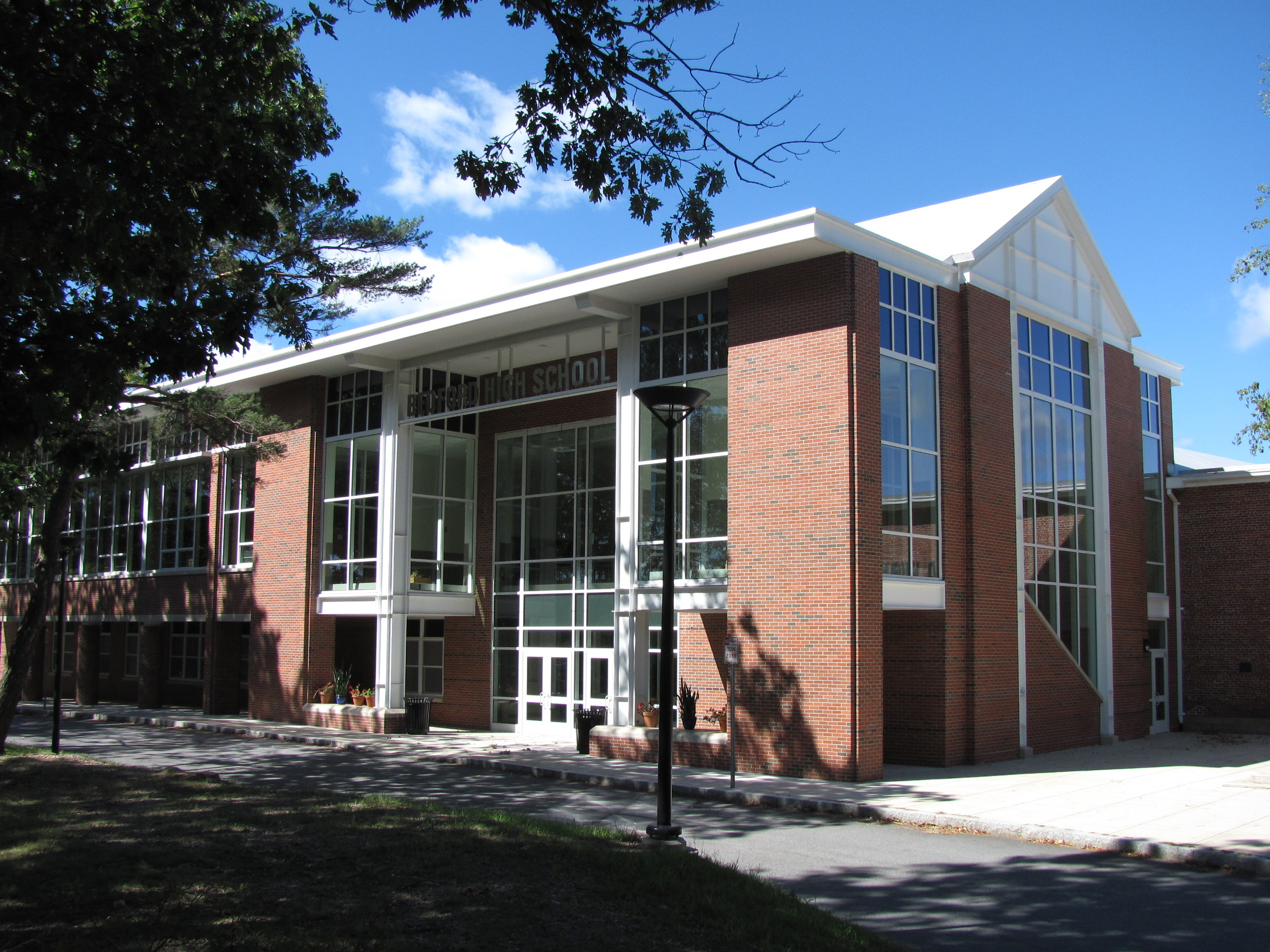
Main entrance to Bedford High

Out of 141 public high schools in Massachusetts, a 2008 issue of Boston rated Bedford High fourth for overall "cost effectiveness" and fourteenth for academic performance statewide. In 2009, the magazine ranked Bedford High the 10th best overall public high school in Massachusetts. In 2010, the magazine ranked BHS the 6th best overall public high school in Massachusetts.

A comprehensive, four-year school, Bedford High is accredited by the New England Association of Schools and Colleges (N.E.A.S.C.). Enrollment is growing and was at 785 with a senior class of 183 for the 2020–2021 school year.

The student-faculty ratio is 16:1, and 76% of the faculty holds an advanced degree. The class of 2009 MCAS passing rate on the first attempt was 100% for English and 100% for math.

== School demographics ==
According to Massachusetts Department of Elementary and Secondary Education annual statistics, for the 2022–2023 academic year, the demographic enrollment distributions for race, gender and grade level at Bedford High School (Massachusetts) are as follows:

Total number of enrolled students: 841
Total number of full-time equivalent educators: 79.1
Therefore, the student to teacher ratio for this school is 10.6:1

Enrollment by Race/Ethnicity (2022–2023)
Race	Enrolled Pupils*	% of District
African American	53	6.3%
Asian	149	17.7%
Hispanic	86	10.2%
Native American	0	0.0%
White	518	61.6%
Native Hawaiian, Pacific Islander	0	0.0%
Multi-Race, Non-Hispanic	35	4.2%
Total	841	100%

* Approximate number of enrolled pupils is calculated based on total number of students in district, multiplied by reported percentage, and rounded to nearest whole student.

Enrollment by gender (2022–2023)
Gender	Enrolled pupils	Percentage
Female	404	48.04%
Male	430	51.13%
Non-binary	7	0.83%
Total	841	100%

Enrollment by Grade
Grade	Pupils Enrolled	Percentage
9	221	26.28%
10	226	26.87%
11	194	23.07%
12	200	23.78%
SP*	0	0%
Total	841	100%

* SP = Special Education Beyond Grade 12

== Notable alumni ==
- Doug Ardito, guitarist and bassist for rock band Puddle of Mudd
- Doug Coombs, alpine skier and mountaineer
- Noah Dines, skier
- John Ferrillo, Principal Oboe, Boston Symphony Orchestra, former co-principal oboe of the Metropolitan Opera Orchestra in New York
- Michael Ratney, diplomat and former U.S. ambassador to Saudi Arabia
- Steve Shea, former professional baseball player, Houston Astros and Montreal Expos
- Taecyeon, actor, model and member of Korean idol group 2PM
- Neera Tanden, former senior advisor to US President Joe Biden
