= Wilson Mill-Old Burlington Road District =

Historic district in Massachusetts, United States

- U.S. National Register of Historic Places
- U.S. Historic district
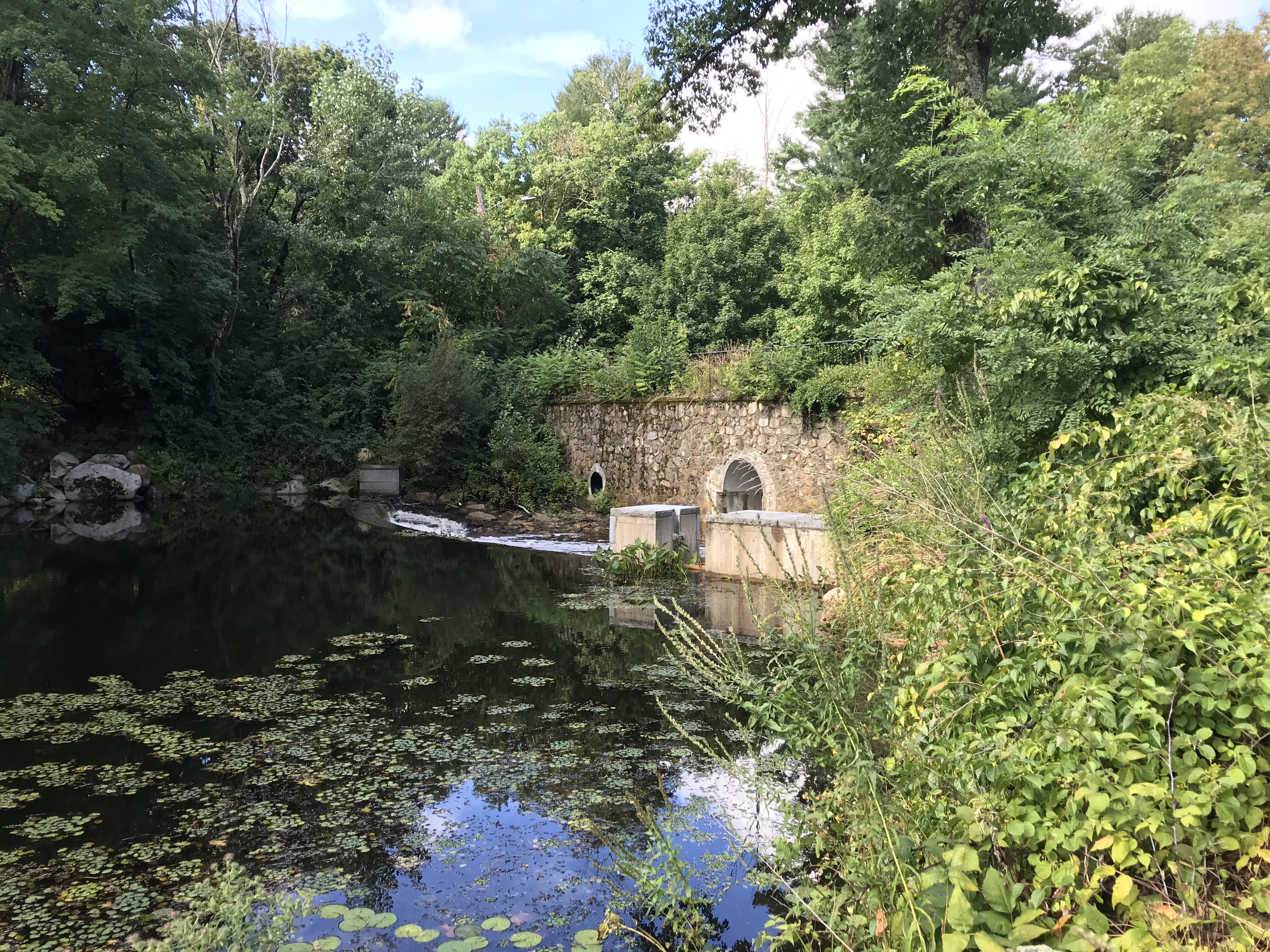
- Old Burlington Road Bridge over Vine Brook

- Location within Massachusetts Location within the United States
- Location: Bedford, Massachusetts
- Coordinates: 42°29′32″N 71°14′46″W
- Area: 9 acres (3.6 ha)
- Architectural style: Georgian, Colonial Revival
- NRHP reference No.: 03000792
- Added to NRHP: August 18, 2003

The Wilson Mill—Old Burlington Road District encompasses a historic mill site and several adjacent historic houses in Bedford, Massachusetts. It is located southwest of the junction of Massachusetts Route 62 and United States Route 3, and includes a mill pond and dam, a stone-lined stream channel, foundations of a 17th-century gristmill, two bridges (one, the Route 62 bridge, is non-contributing), and three houses. The mill site is located just off Old Burlington Road, west of its crossing of Vine Brook. Just south of Old Burlington Road lies the mill pond and dam. The oldest of the three houses in the district is the Bacon-Gleason-Blodgett Homestead, built c. 1740 and home to several of the mill's owners. The other two houses, at 130 and 138 Old Burlington Road, were built around the turn of the 20th century, and are associated with the Hunt family, longtime landowners in the area.

The district was listed on the National Register of Historic Places in 2003.

== See also ==
- National Register of Historic Places listings in Middlesex County, Massachusetts
