= Noah Dines =

American skier

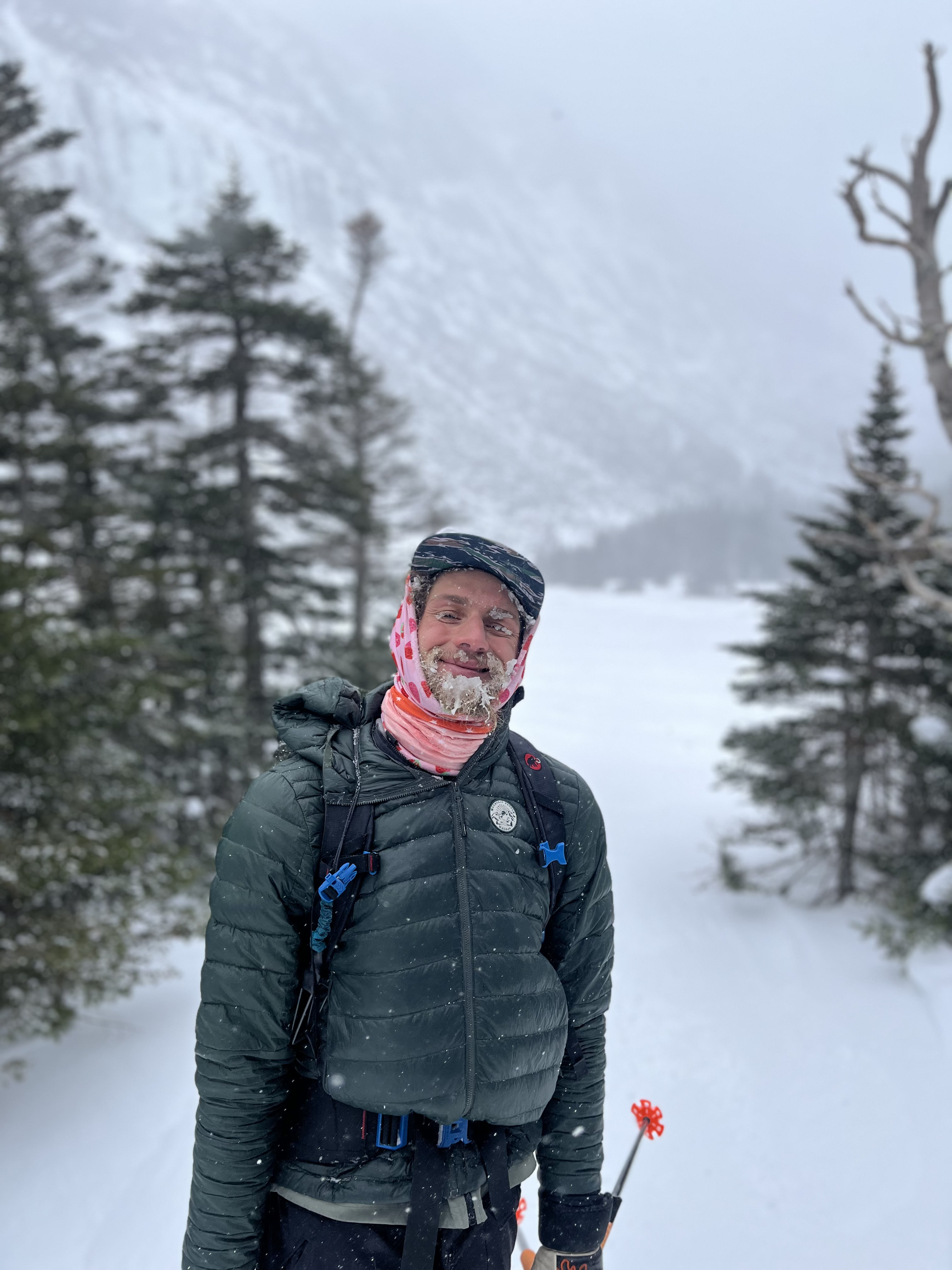
Noah Dines in Baxter State Park in 2025

Noah Dines is an American skier who holds the record for most human powered vertical feet skied in a single calendar year. Dines set this record from January 1, 2024 to December 30, 2024 using ski touring equipment to ascend uphill and ski back down.

== Skiing record ==
Dines's original goal was to ski 3 million human powered vertical feet, aiming to beat the previous record of 2,506,499 vertical feet set by Aaron Rice in 2016. Dines surpassed Rice's record on September 2, 2024 and reached his own goal of 3 million human powered vertical feet on October 24, 2024. With more time before the end of the year, Dines continued to set the bar higher, reaching 1 million meters (3,280,840 feet) on December 2 2024. Dines's final total for the year was 3,590,097 feet of human powered vertical feet. On February 14, 2025, Dines was congratulated for his accomplishment by the Vermont House of Representatives at the Vermont State House.

== Personal life ==
Dines grew up in Bedford, Massachusetts and attended Bedford High School. He holds a degree in political science from the University of Connecticut.

He resides in Stowe, Vermont.
