= Bedford Public Schools (Massachusetts) =

School district in Bedford, Massachusetts

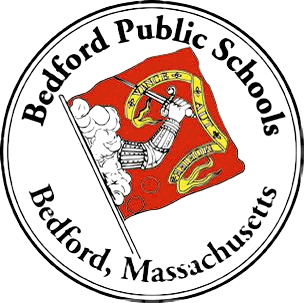

Location
- 97 McMahon Rd. Bedford, Massachusetts 01730 United States

District information
- Type: Public
- Grades: K–12
- Superintendent: Cliff Chuang

Students and staff
- Students: 2,689
- Teachers: 237.5 (FTE)
- Student–teacher ratio: 11.3 to 1 (FTE)
- Colors: Blue and White

Other information
- Website: http://www.bedford.k12.ma.us/

Bedford Public Schools is a school district in Bedford, Massachusetts, United States. Once encompassing five elementary schools, a junior high and high school, has since made changes to system layout. From 1979 to 1989, they have closed two elementary schools, and restructured which schools students attend for certain grades. In recent years, The Davis School was completely rebuilt next to the former building, and The Job Lane School and the Bedford High School received additions increasing the capacity of those buildings.

== Schools ==
- Bedford High School Grades 9–12; Also serves High School pupils from Hanscom Air Force Base
- John Glenn Middle School (Formerly John Glenn Junior High School, Bedford Junior High School; Formerly grades 7 & 8) Grades 6-8 (named for a previous school superintendent, not the former Senator and astronaut)
- Lt. Job Lane Elementary School (Formerly grades K-6) Grades 3-5
- Lt. Eleazer Davis Elementary School (Formerly grades K-6) Grades K-2
- Center Elementary School (Closed 1979; Grades K-6)
- Union School (Formally a Junior High School by Center Elementary School)
- Nathaniel Page School (Closed c. 1982; Grades K-6) (Formally Grades 1–5 with grade 6 sent to the Job Lane School)

== Schoolhouses ==
- North School
- South School
- West School (209 Concord Road, Private dwelling)
- East School (37 Old Billerica Road, Private dwelling)
- Old Town Hall (Formally school for K-6, in the town's center)
- Central School (moved to 56 Springs Road in 1806, Private dwelling)
