= Bedford, Massachusetts =

- Town
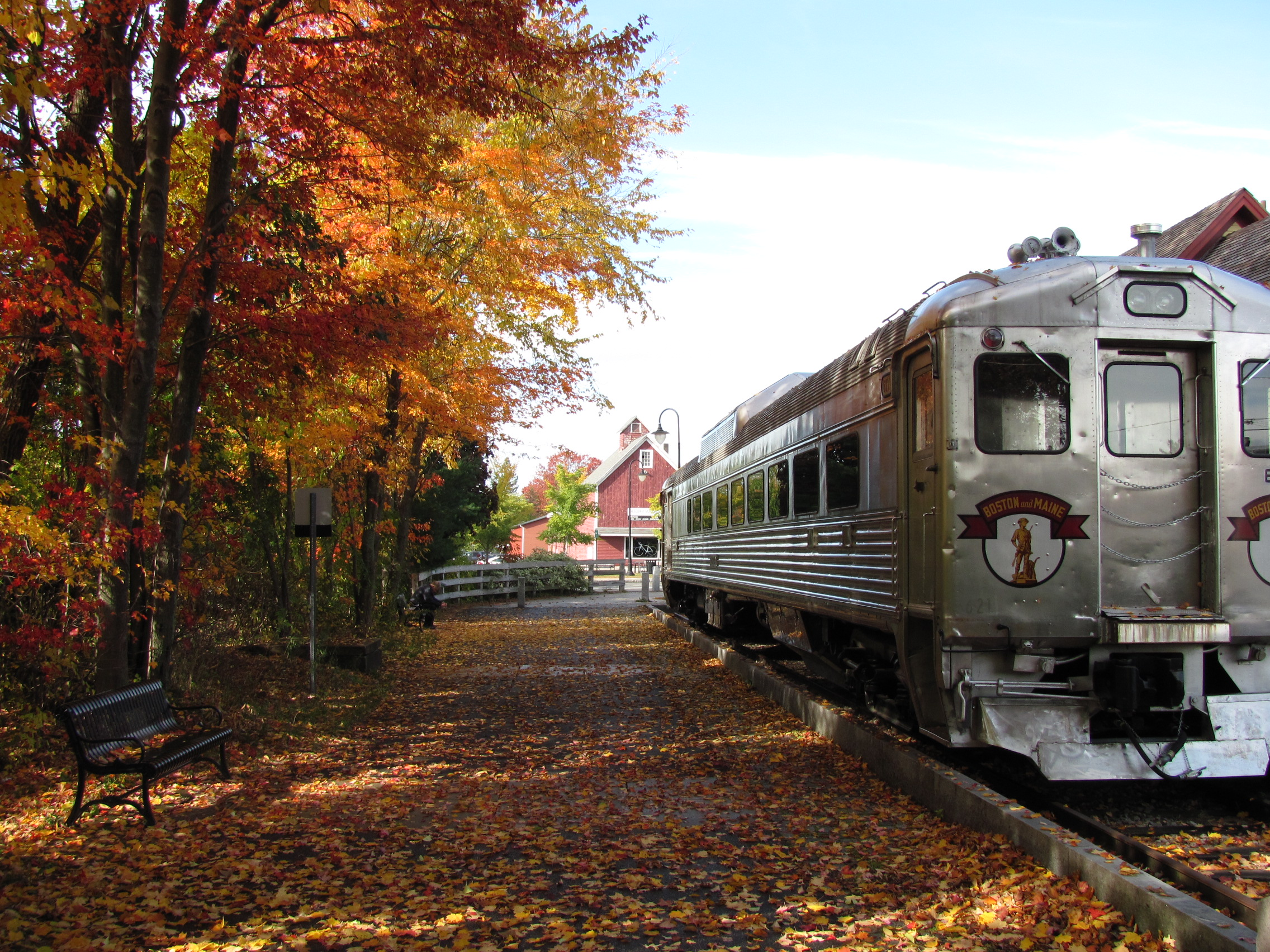
- Bedford Depot

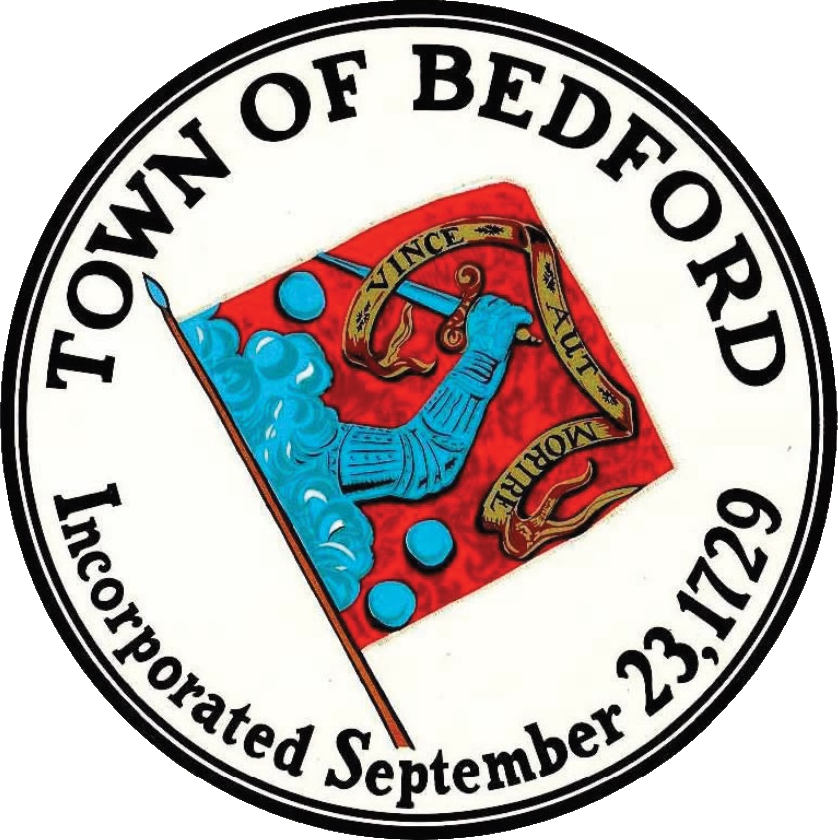
- Flag Seal

- Location in Middlesex County in Massachusetts
- Coordinates: 42°29′26″N 71°16′36″W
- Country: United States
- State: Massachusetts
- County: Middlesex
- Settled: 1640
- Incorporated: 1729
- Named for: Bedford, England

Government
  - Type: Open town meeting
  - Town Manager: Matthew J. Hanson
  - Select Board: Daniel Brosogol, Chair; Paul Mortenson; Shawn Hanegan; Bopha Malone; Terrence Parker

Area
  - Total: 13.9 sq mi (35.9 km^{2})
  - Land: 13.7 sq mi (35.6 km^{2})
  - Water: 0.12 sq mi (0.3 km^{2})
- Elevation: 135 ft (41 m)

Population (2020)
  - Total: 14,383
  - Density: 1,050/sq mi (404/km^{2})
- Time zone: UTC−5 (Eastern)
  - Summer (DST): UTC−4 (Eastern)
- ZIP Codes: 01730 (Bedford); 01731 (Hanscom AFB)
- Area code: 339/781
- FIPS code: 25-04615
- GNIS feature ID: 0619395
- Website: www.bedfordma.gov

Bedford is a town in Middlesex County, Massachusetts, United States. The population of Bedford was 14,383 at the 2020 United States census. Bedford is a suburb of Boston, located about 21 miles (around 33.8 km) northwest.

== History ==
The following compilation comes from Ellen Abrams (1999) based on information from Abram English Brown's History of the Town of Bedford (1891), as well as other sources such as The Bedford Sampler Bicentennial Edition containing Daisy Pickman Oakley's articles, Bedford Vital Records, New England Historical and Genealogical Register, Town Directories, and other publications from the Bedford Historical Society.

The land now within the boundaries of Bedford was first settled by Europeans around 1640. In 1729 it was incorporated from a portion of Concord (about 2/5 of Bedford) and a portion of Billerica (about 3/5 of Bedford).

In 1630, John Winthrop and Thomas Dudley of the Massachusetts Bay Company arrived aboard the Arabella from Yarmouth, England. After a difficult ten-week voyage, they landed on the shores of the New World, with Salem and Boston Harbor being the Arabella's earliest destinations. In 1637, the General Court of Massachusetts granted some 2,200 acres (9 km^{2}) of land, including Huckins Farm land to the first governor, John Winthrop, and to Deputy Governor Thomas Dudley. The following year, the two men agreed to divide the land so that the parcel south of the two large boulders by the Concord River (Brothers Rocks) belonged to Governor Winthrop and north of the Rocks was to belong to Deputy Governor Dudley. Later, Dudley became governor. Dudley's son Rev. Samuel Dudley and Winthrop's daughter Mary were married; thus Brothers Rocks were so named because of this marriage of families.

=== Huckins Farm and Job Lane House ===
Governor Winthrop's grandson, Fitz John Winthrop, in 1664, sold 1,200 acres (5 km^{2}) of this land (including what is present-day Huckins Farm) to Job Lane (1), a skilled artisan and house builder, in exchange for a house that Lane built for him in Connecticut. (Note: The numbers appended to the names of Lane family members indicate the generation number beginning with Job Lane (1), who immigrated from Mill End, Rickmansworth, England.) Upon his death, he passed all of this land to his son, John Lane (2), who left it to his three sons, John Lane (3), Job Lane (3), and James Lane (3). John Lane and his wife, Catherine (Whiting), lived on the site, and after she died, he married Hannah Abbott. Upon his death in 1763, their son, Samuel Lane, inherited the land now known as Huckins Farm. Some time after Samuel Lane died in 1802, the house was removed and Peter Farmer built the present farmhouse in the 1840s. It is known that Peter and Dorcas Farmer had two children in the late 1820s and 1830s. Later, Banfield succeeded Farmer as the owner.

Samuel W. Huckins, born in 1817, settled on the land about 1870. Huckins was respected for his good judgment and was honored with various offices in town. Maps c. 1875 indicate that what is now known as Dudley Road was once called Huckins Street. Samuel Huckins lived there until his death in 1892. He had a son, Henry, who was born in 1849, and was living in Bedford in 1910.

In the late 19th century, Dudley Leavitt Pickman, descendant of an old Salem merchant family, and his wife Ellen fell in love with the land. They bought a substantial parcel (mostly Winthrop's land and a portion of Dudley's grant). Huckins Farm was a part of this purchase. A direct descendant of both Winthrop and Dudley, Pickman bought the land without knowledge of the Winthrop-Dudley grant. He discovered later that he had purchased his ancestors' lands. About 1889, he had the Two Brothers Rocks inscribed with the names "Dudley" and "Winthrop" as well as the year 1638, as noted in the Bedford Town Report in 1889.

The land was used as a dairy farm and apple orchard, in addition to the fields, pasture land, bog garden, and ponds. Chestnut trees lined the old road between the fields. A portion of Dudley Road was named Chestnut Avenue around that time. Today's Dudley Road and Winthrop Avenue in Bedford, as well as Pickman Drive, are named for these families.

A large portion of the Pickman land, Huckins Farm, was sold to a developer for condominium development in 1987, and other parcels including the large Pickman house (Stearns Farm) were sold to private parties.

== Historical sites ==
Bedford Flag – First Battle Flag (1775)

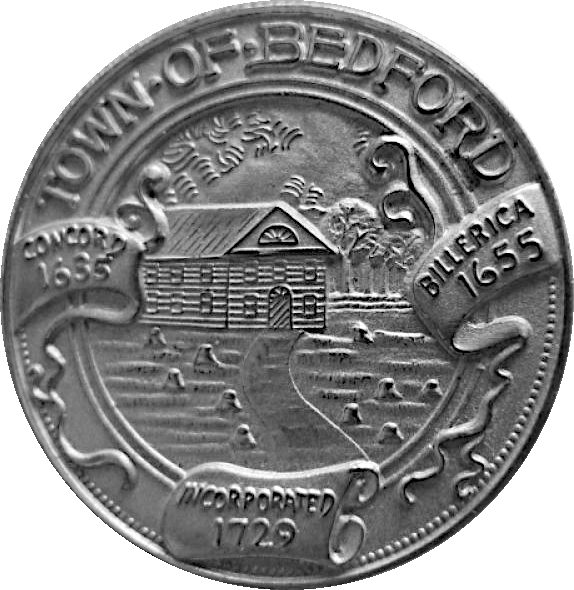
Old seal of Bedford, used until 1929.

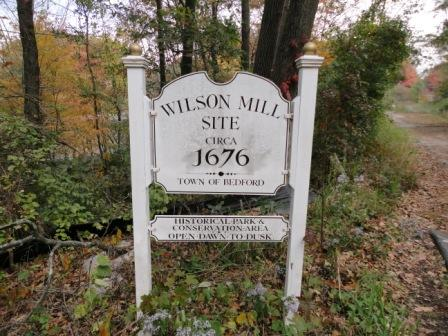
Wilson Mill Site marker

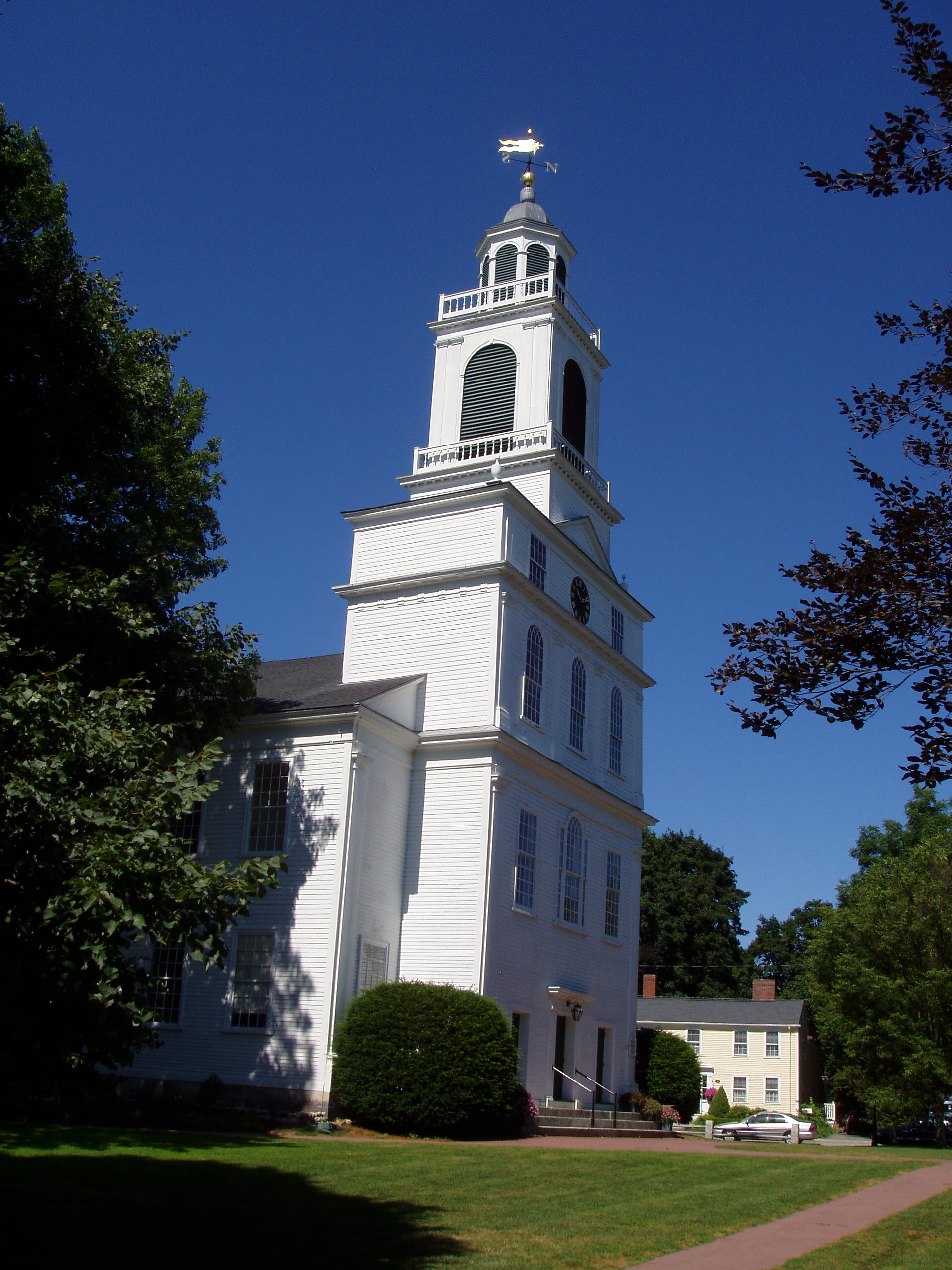
Exterior, Unitarian Church (1816)

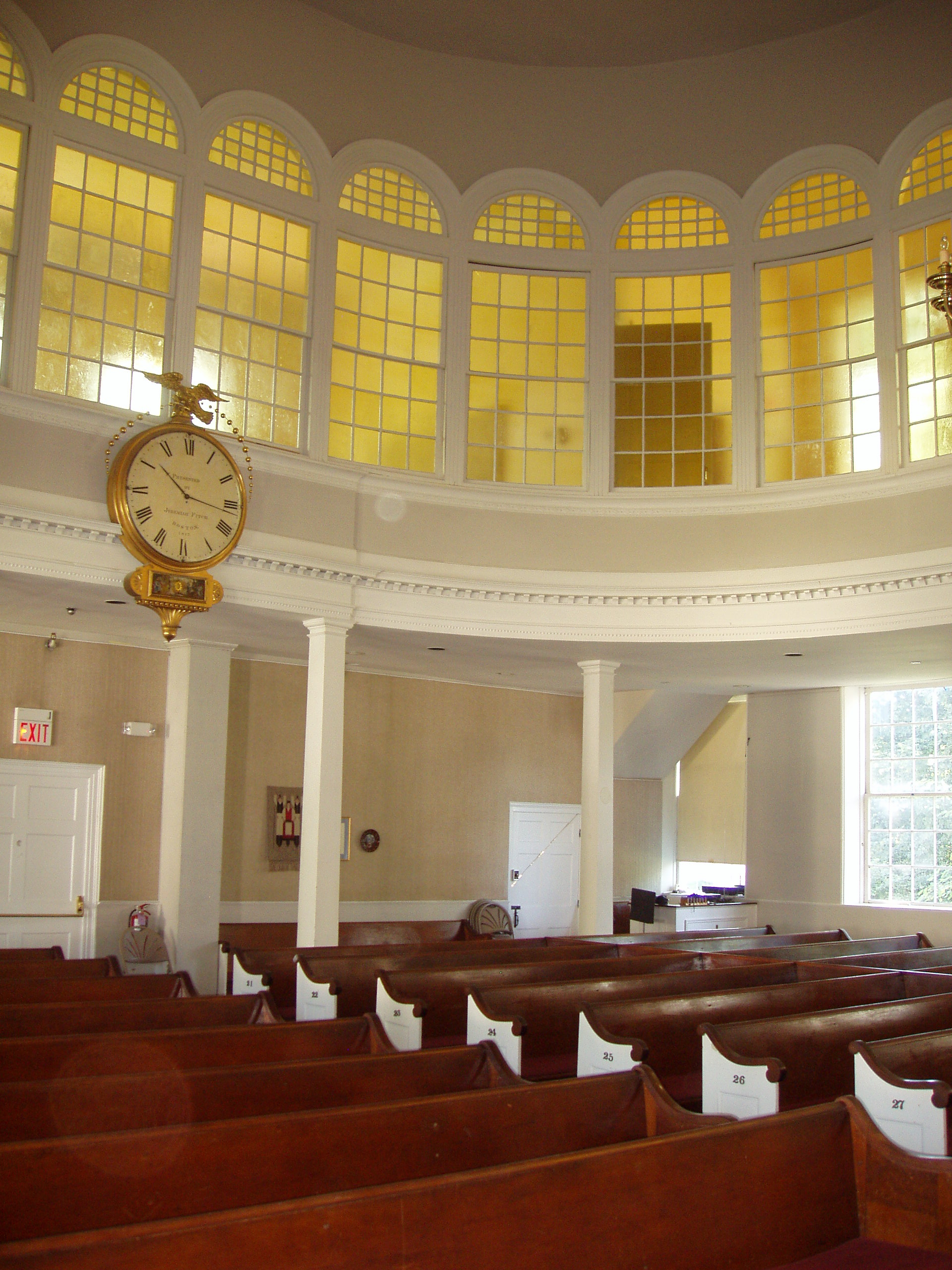
Interior, Unitarian Church

=== Bedford Flag ===
By the rude bridge that arched the flood, their flag to April's breeze unfurled - here once the embattled farmers stood, and fired the shot heard 'round the world.

— Ralph Waldo Emerson

The Bedford flag on display at the Bedford Free Public Library is the oldest known surviving intact battle flag in the United States. It is celebrated for having been the first U.S. flag flown during the American Revolutionary War, as it is believed to have been carried by Nathaniel Page's outfit of Minutemen to the Old North Bridge in Concord for the Battle of Concord on April 19, 1775.

Though the flag previously had a border of silver tassels, the tassels were cut from it to adorn the dress of Page's daughter.

The Latin motto on the flag, "Vince Aut Morire", means "Conquer or Die."

=== Two Brothers Rocks ===
When Governor Winthrop and his Deputy Thomas Dudley viewed their lands in early 1638, they decided to use two great stones on the eastern bank of the Concord River to divide the property. Winthrop claimed the land to one side of one rock; Dudley claimed the land on the other side of the other rock. They named the rocks "The Two Brothers". Over the years, the two men had many differences; however, they learned to work together and even considered themselves "brothers" by their children's marriage. The rocks have come to symbolize the men's spirit of cooperation and democracy. The Two Brothers Rocks can still be seen near the banks of the Concord River in the Great Meadows National Wildlife Refuge. In 2009 the site was restored for an Eagle Scout project in collaboration with the U.S. Fish and Wildlife service, and the Bedford Historic Preservation Commission. The area around the site was listed on the National Register of Historic Places in 2010 as the Two Brothers Rocks–Dudley Road Historic District.

Access to the site is possible through the Altmann Conservation Area, named after Madeleine Altmann and source of much of her video art.

=== Great Meadows National Wildlife Refuge ===
The early settlers called this area along the Concord River the "Great River Meadow" because they could harvest hay along the grass banks when the water retreated each summer. Today, this 12-mile (19 km) stretch of freshwater wetlands is a sanctuary for migratory birds and wildlife. Deer, cottontail rabbit, fox, raccoon, muskrat, beaver, weasel and over 200 species of birds may be seen here.

=== Job Lane House ===
This traditional saltbox-style home at 295 North Road dates back to the early 18th century and was built by Job Lane (3), the grandson of one of Bedford's earliest settlers, Job Lane (1), a master carpenter. Job Lane (3) was a church deacon and also a town officer. His son Job Lane (4) was a Minuteman; he was wounded in the battle of Concord. The house and grounds, not far from Huckins Farm, has been restored and is open to the public from 2–4 pm on the second and fourth Sunday of the month, May through October.

=== Fitch Tavern ===
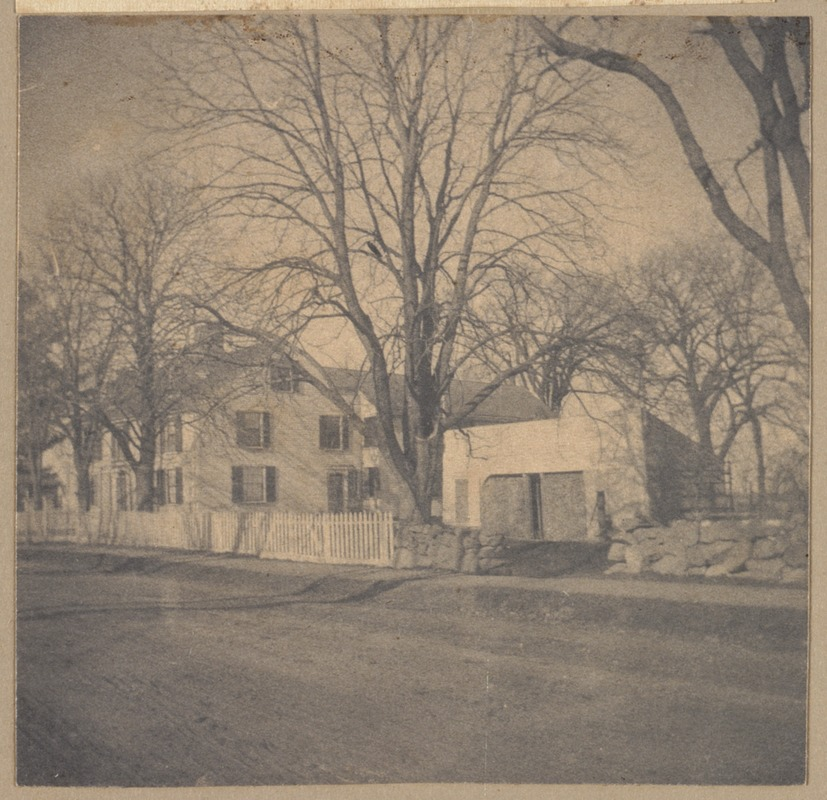
Bedford, Fitch Tavern, c. 1895–1905. Archive of Photographic Documentation of Early Massachusetts Architecture, Boston Public Library.

Early on the morning of April 19, 1775, an alarm sounded warning the people of Bedford that British soldiers were marching from Boston to Concord. Their captain, Jonathan Willson, told them, "It is a cold breakfast boys, but we'll give them a hot dinner." The Fitch Tavern is located in Bedford center, a little over a mile from Huckins Farm.

=== John Wilson Corne Mill ===
The ruins of this old mill over Vine Brook (on Wilson and Old Burlington Road) were added to the national historical register in 2003 (see photo). A 1972 "Bedford Landmark Tour" says, "Site of the Wilson mills dating from about 1685; mills, dam, and pond passed from the Wilson family about 1770 to Oliver Bacon, then bought by Jonas Gleason (1782) and by Simeon Blodgett (1816); through the years, the site was operated as a grist mill, a saw mill, and later a cider mill."

=== Elijah Stearns Mansion ===
The Elijah Stearns Mansion is located in the heart of Bedford's Historic District and across from Wilson Park at 4 Great Road. Built by Stearns around 1800, it is a fine example of Federal architecture, which features brick ends, four chimneys and a doorway arched in glass and wrought iron. A carriage house is attached to the main house, and, until 1895, a structure which was known as The Boston Cash Store also resided on the property. It was the first store in the village at the time. It also became the first post office for the town when Elijah Stearns was appointed postmaster in 1825. Later, in 1867, the building became the Bedford Public Library. The building which housed the store, post office, and library has since been moved to 22 Loomis Street. The home is part of the Bedford Center Historic District which was listed on the National Register of Historic Places in 1977.

== Geography ==
According to the United States Census Bureau, the town has a total area of 13.9 square miles (36 km^{2}), of which 13.7 square miles (35 km^{2}) is land and 0.1 square miles (0.26 km^{2}), or 0.94%, is water. Bedford is approximately 15 miles (24 km) from the coast.

Bedford is a relatively circular town. Its neighbors, clockwise, starting from 12 o'clock, are Billerica, Burlington, Lexington, Lincoln, Concord and Carlisle.

In addition to the Concord River which forms part of the town's borders, the Shawsheen River flows through town. Vine Brook flows from Lexington through Burlington and into the Shawsheen in Bedford. In the 1840s, a large paper mill was built on Vine Brook that supplied many of the jobs in town.

=== Climate ===
Bedford has a hot-summer humid continental climate (Dfa under the Köppen climate classification system), with high humidity and precipitation year-round.

Climate data for Bedford, Massachusetts, 1991–2020 normals, extremes 1949–present
Month	Jan	Feb	Mar	Apr	May	Jun	Jul	Aug	Sep	Oct	Nov	Dec	Year
Record high °F (°C)	72 (22)	75 (24)	82 (28)	93 (34)	96 (36)	99 (37)	102 (39)	101 (38)	101 (38)	88 (31)	84 (29)	76 (24)	102 (39)
Mean maximum °F (°C)	58.0 (14.4)	57.8 (14.3)	67.5 (19.7)	81.8 (27.7)	88.8 (31.6)	91.9 (33.3)	94.5 (34.7)	93.0 (33.9)	89.1 (31.7)	79.5 (26.4)	70.0 (21.1)	62.2 (16.8)	96.0 (35.6)
Mean daily maximum °F (°C)	35.8 (2.1)	38.7 (3.7)	46.6 (8.1)	58.9 (14.9)	69.8 (21.0)	77.9 (25.5)	83.8 (28.8)	81.9 (27.7)	74.1 (23.4)	62.2 (16.8)	51.3 (10.7)	40.8 (4.9)	60.2 (15.6)
Daily mean °F (°C)	26.8 (−2.9)	28.8 (−1.8)	36.6 (2.6)	47.6 (8.7)	57.8 (14.3)	66.6 (19.2)	72.6 (22.6)	70.9 (21.6)	63.0 (17.2)	51.4 (10.8)	41.4 (5.2)	32.0 (0.0)	49.6 (9.8)
Mean daily minimum °F (°C)	17.7 (−7.9)	18.9 (−7.3)	26.7 (−2.9)	36.3 (2.4)	45.9 (7.7)	55.4 (13.0)	61.4 (16.3)	60.0 (15.6)	51.8 (11.0)	40.5 (4.7)	31.4 (−0.3)	23.3 (−4.8)	39.1 (4.0)
Mean minimum °F (°C)	−3.7 (−19.8)	−0.3 (−17.9)	8.2 (−13.2)	24.0 (−4.4)	32.0 (0.0)	42.0 (5.6)	50.3 (10.2)	47.4 (8.6)	35.7 (2.1)	25.2 (−3.8)	16.5 (−8.6)	4.5 (−15.3)	−5.2 (−20.7)
Record low °F (°C)	−20 (−29)	−15 (−26)	−7 (−22)	6 (−14)	26 (−3)	36 (2)	42 (6)	33 (1)	28 (−2)	14 (−10)	7 (−14)	−15 (−26)	−20 (−29)
Average precipitation inches (mm)	3.75 (95)	3.37 (86)	4.80 (122)	3.90 (99)	3.76 (96)	4.10 (104)	3.79 (96)	3.94 (100)	3.72 (94)	4.85 (123)	4.11 (104)	4.79 (122)	48.88 (1,241)
Average snowfall inches (cm)	16.1 (41)	12.5 (32)	12.9 (33)	2.3 (5.8)	0.0 (0.0)	0.0 (0.0)	0.0 (0.0)	0.0 (0.0)	0.0 (0.0)	0.1 (0.25)	1.9 (4.8)	13.2 (34)	59.0 (150)
Average precipitation days (≥ 0.01 in)	12.9	11.2	12.8	12.5	13.5	11.8	10.6	10.3	9.8	10.7	12.7	12.7	141.5
Average snowy days (≥ 0.1 in)	8.5	7.4	6.0	1.3	0.1	0.0	0.0	0.0	0.0	0.2	1.5	6.0	31.0
Source 1: NOAA
Source 2: National Weather Service

== Demographics ==
Historical population
Year	Pop.	±%
1790	523	—
1800	538	+2.9%
1810	592	+10.0%
1820	648	+9.5%
1830	685	+5.7%
1840	929	+35.6%
1850	975	+5.0%
1860	843	−13.5%
1870	849	+0.7%
1880	931	+9.7%
1890	1,092	+17.3%
1900	1,208	+10.6%
1910	1,231	+1.9%
1920	1,362	+10.6%
1930	2,603	+91.1%
1940	3,807	+46.3%
1950	5,234	+37.5%
1960	10,969	+109.6%
1970	13,513	+23.2%
1980	13,067	−3.3%
1990	12,996	−0.5%
2000	12,595	−3.1%
2010	13,320	+5.8%
2020	14,383	+8.0%
2022*	14,161	−1.5%
* = population estimate. Source: United States census records and Population Estimates Program data.

At the 2022 census, there were 14,161 people, 5,540 (2017–2021) households with 2.51 persons per household. The population density was 1,052.8 inhabitants per square mile (406.5/km^{2}). There were 4,708 housing units in 2020 at an average density of 342.7 per square mile (132.3/km^{2}). The racial makeup of the town was 72.3% White, 3.2% African American, 0.2% Native American, 18.5% Asian, 0.% from other races, and 3.6% from two or more races. Hispanic or Latino of any race were 3.5% of the population.

There were 5,540 (2017–2021) households, of which 34.1% had children under the age of 18 living with them, 64.4% were married couples living together, 7.3% had a female householder with no husband present, and 26.0% were non-families. 21.8% of all households were made up of individuals, and 10.2% had someone living alone who was 65 years of age or older. The average household size was 2.60 and the average family size was 3.04.

23.6% of the population were under the age of 18, 3.9% from 18 to 24, 27.8% from 25 to 44, 26.3% from 45 to 64, and 18.3% who were 65 years of age or older. The median age was 42 years. For every 100 females, there were 99.3 males. For every 100 females age 18 and over, there were 96.3 males.

The median household income was $87,962 and the median family income was $101,081. Males had a median income of $65,697 and females $45,181. The per capita income was $39,212. About 1.4% of families and 2.5% of the population were below the poverty line, including 3.1% of those under age 18 and 4.0% of those age 65 or over.

== Government ==
The town uses an open town meeting as its legislature. The executive branch consists of a Select Board who oversee a Town Manager.

Bedford was the home of a Consolidated Mail Outpatient Pharmacy (CMOP). It was the part of an initiative by the Department of Veterans Affairs to provide mail order prescriptions to veterans using computerization at strategic locations throughout the United States. It has moved to the Lowell area as a result of the Veterans Administrations Cares Mission and is no longer in Bedford.

As part of the Middlesex 21st District, Bedford is represented by Ken Gordon in the Massachusetts House of Representatives.

== Education ==
Bedford Public Schools operate Bedford's public school system. It consists of four buildings: Lt. Eleazer Davis Elementary (K–2), Lt. Job Lane Elementary (3–5), John Glenn Middle School (6–8), and Bedford High School (9–12).

The on-post K-8 school of Hanscom Air Force Base, a base which is partially located in Bedford, is operated by the Lincoln School District. Dependents of active duty military living on the base are sent to Bedford High. High school students living on the base who are not dependents of active duty military personnel are sent to Lincoln-Sudbury Regional High School of the Lincoln-Sudbury Regional School District.

There is a METCO program, where students from Boston come to the Bedford schools, starting in kindergarten and staying with the class until graduation. Bedford is also part of the school district of Shawsheen Valley Technical High School which is in nearby Billerica.

The former Center School was deactivated in the 1970s, and is today the Town Center and Recreation Department Nathaniel Page School was similarly deactivated in about 1982 and today is a condominium community. Davis, Lane and Page elementary schools were all k–6 at one time.

John Glenn Middle School (originally called Bedford Junior High School) is named for John Glenn, formerly the Superintendent of Schools in Bedford, not for the U.S. Senator and astronaut. The Davis and Lane (and former Page) schools are named for local officers who took part in the Battle of Concord on April 19, 1775.

== Transportation ==
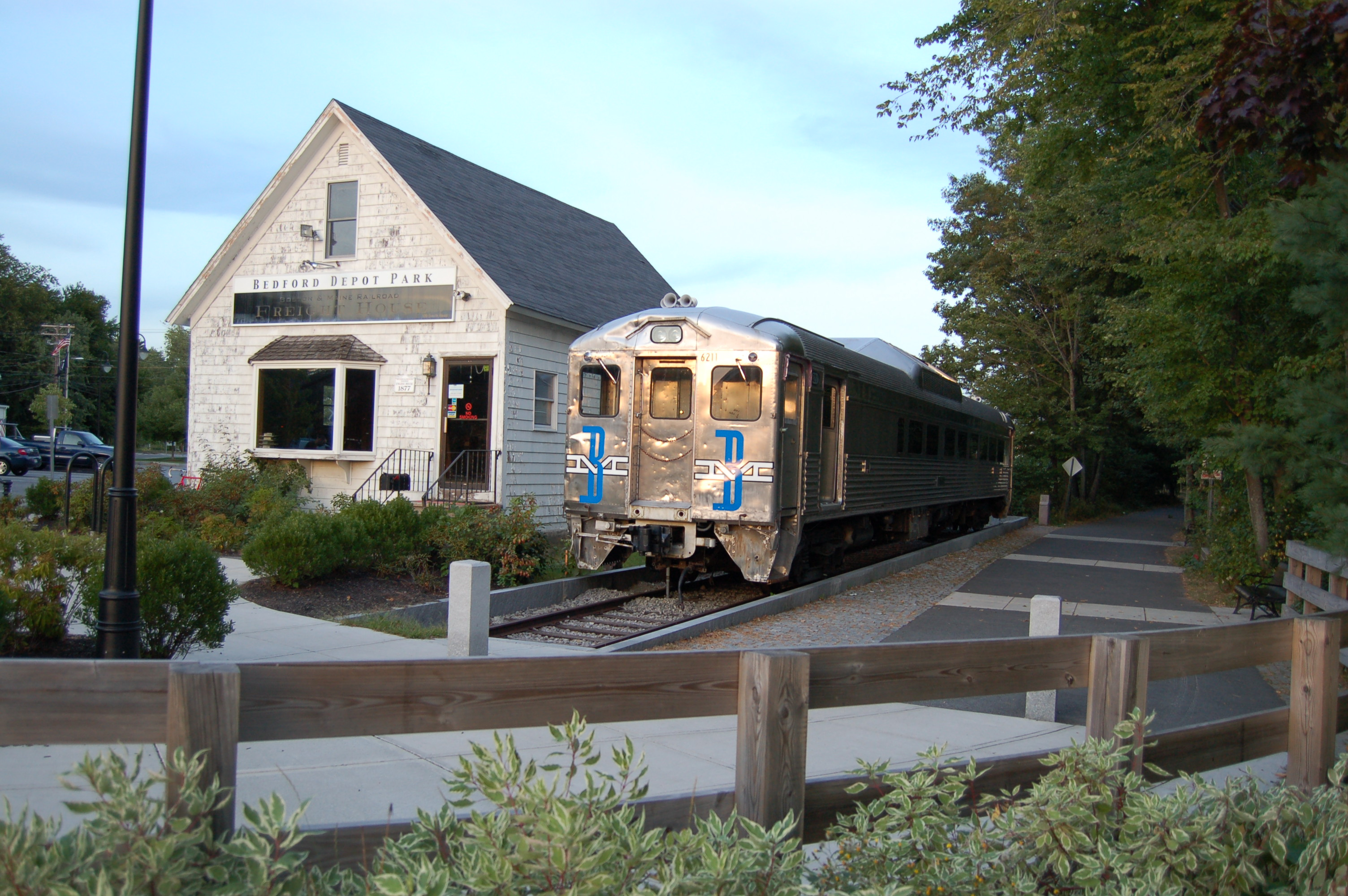
Bedford Depot Park at the end of the Minuteman Bikeway

=== Road ===
Bedford is slightly northwest of the intersection of I-95 (also known as MA-128) and MA-4/MA-225 (which cross in Lexington). Important roads through town include US-3 (an expressway) and MA-62.

=== Bus ===
The town is served by the 62 and 62/76 lines of the MBTA's bus service. The MBTA operates the Route 351 express bus service, from Alewife; the bus terminates at Oak Park Drive, Bedford Woods, and EMD Serono; this service operates only on the morning and evening weekday rush-hour times and connects to the Red Line at Alewife.

=== Air ===
Bedford is served by Hanscom Field (IATA: BED, ICAO: KBED), a civilian airport, adjacent to Hanscom Air Force Base.

=== Rail (defunct) ===
A snowstorm on January 10, 1977, prompted the end of passenger service on the Lexington Branch of the Boston & Maine Railroad (see additional notes under Boston and Lowell Railroad). The line was embargoed four years later. In 1991, the branch was railbanked by the Interstate Commerce Commission. It is now used for the Minuteman Bikeway. In the early 20th century, the Middlesex & Boston Street Railway line ran generally down Great Road (Routes 4 and 225), with lines from as far west as Hudson running into Lexington and beyond.

Other historic transportation systems through Bedford included the narrow-gauge Billerica and Bedford Railroad and the Middlesex Turnpike.

== Notable people ==
- Doug Ardito, rock musician
- Joe Bellino, Heisman Trophy 1960 (U. S. Naval Academy)
- Doug Coombs, professional skier
- Noah Dines, skier
- Jimmy Fowlie, actor and writer with The Groundlings in Los Angeles and writer on SNL
- Eric Lu, classical pianist, winner of the 2025 XIX International Chopin Piano Competition in Warsaw and the 2018 Leeds International Piano Competition.
- Ernst Mayr (1904–2005), German-born evolutionary biologist, died in Bedford at the age of 100
- Lydia O'Leary, inventor
- Helen Ramsay, singer
- James Stavridis, retired United States Navy Admiral (originally from West Palm Beach, Florida)
- Taecyeon, member of the South Korean pop group 2PM, went to middle and high school in Bedford (Originally from Irwon-dong, Gangnam-gu, Seoul, South Korea)
- Neera Tanden, president of the Center for American Progress and confidant to the Clintons
- Lawrence Watt-Evans, science fiction and fantasy author; went to high school in Bedford
