= Consolidated Mail Outpatient Pharmacy =

Initiative of the U.S. Department of Veterans Affairs

The Consolidated Mail Outpatient Pharmacy (CMOP) initiative of the United States Department of Veterans Affairs (VA) uses highly automated facilities to fulfill prescriptions for Veterans.

== History ==
During the 1970s and 1980s, the VA began experimenting with the consolidation of mail prescription workloads. By 1994, it was ready for a computerized test project.

Joseph Haymond, a pharmacist, instituted a manual filling system at the Leavenworth VA Hospital in the 1980s and processed all mail requests from Leavenworth VA and Topeka VA. He then transferred to the Nashville VA and, working with engineers from Baxter, developed the first prototype machines that led to the full development of the automation in the CMOPs. Haymond led the development of the Murfreesboro CMOP development project in an old supply warehouse in Murfreesboro, which was the first of the "new" CMOPs. The original Leavenworth CMOP was built in a multistory building that was not as efficient as the CMOP in Murfreesboro. The success of the Murfreesboro project led to the creation of the new type CMOPs listed below.

The CMOP program now fills 80 percent of all the prescriptions in the VA. The remaining 20 percent are filled at the VA hospitals.

The CMOP program is now serving the entire country from seven locations: Chelmsford, Massachusetts; Lancaster, Texas; Hines, Illinois; North Charleston, South Carolina; Leavenworth, Kansas; Murfreesboro, Tennessee; and Tucson, Arizona. The Tucson CMOP was originally located in Los Angeles and the newest CMOP is located in North Charleston, South Carolina. The website for this newest CMOP shows it as being permanently closed.

== Operations ==
The CMOP program fills continuation of therapy or refill prescriptions only along with non-medicine items that are on the United States Department of Veterans Affairs formulary master. Initial prescriptions are written for veterans at one of the Veteran Administration's health care facilities. When a refill is needed, the VA Medical Center process the prescriptions. The CMOP then uploads this information from multiple Medical Centers in its region. Every prescription that is fulfilled is checked by a VA pharmacist in the CMOP. The CMOP pharmacists can reject a prescription sent from a VA Medical Center for a number of technical/medical situations.

Once filled, the US Postal Service, United Parcel Service, FedEx, or DHL deliver the prescriptions. Less than one percent of the fulfilled prescriptions do not get to the Veteran due to a variety of address and mailing reasons. The health care facility or clinic is notified of the prescription's completion electronically.

As of 2019, the annual workload of all of the combined CMOPs was approximately 120 million prescriptions, fulfilling 80 percent of the prescriptions needed by VA Medical Center and the Community Based Outpatient Clinics. The maximum turnaround time is 48 hours from the time an order is transmitted from a centralized database in Arizona and a prescription arrives at its final destination on average 2.2 days after it gets into the mail stream.

The North Charleston, Dallas, Hines, and Tucson CMOPs operate on two shifts per day. All remaining CMOPs operate on one shift per day with all locations running single shifts on an as-needed basis on Saturdays.

Controlled medicine prescriptions are fulfilled by only two (Murfreesboro and North Charleston) of the seven CMOPs.

At each CMOP there is a varied mix of government employees along with contract employees.

The CMOP program has won the J.D Power and Associates National Pharmacy Studies "Among The Best" award every year since 2009.

== Government efficiencies ==
Because of congressional interest in exploring if CMOP could provide cost savings for Department of Defense beneficiaries picking up outpatient refill prescriptions from military treatment facilities, the DOD and VA conducted a pilot program in FY 2003. In its 2005 report, GAO-05-555, the Government Accountability Office (GAO) found that the DOD could generate savings because CMOP's size allows it to negotiate volume discounts.

Since the report was written, there has been no action to merge the DoD and the VA CMOP operations.

== Controversies ==
=== MyHealtheVet Pill Bottle Caps ===
In 2015 it was discovered that the caps on pill bottles advertising the VA's My HealtheVet web page were not appropriate. The pill bottles should have been capped with an approved cap, thus creating a cap and bottle "system" that was approved by the manufacturer. This oversight has since been corrected.

=== Illegal Gratuities Related to Hiring Temporary Pharmacist Employees ===
On June 30, 2008 the US Department of Justice released information that the former director of the Hines, Illinois VA CMOP, Joel Gostomelsky, agreed to plead guilty to conspiracy and accepting illegal gratuities.

The plea agreement was filed June 30, 2008 in U.S. District Court in Chicago. Gostomelsky "admitted to conspiring with a subordinate between 2000 and 2007 to allow the subordinate to be involved in the hiring and supervising of temporary pharmacist employees supplied to the CMOP by a company owned by the subordinate's spouse." Gostomelsky initially was not telling the truth to the VA when he stated the subordinate had played no part in the ordering of this service and that the subordinate would not be involved with making decisions affecting the employees of the temporary staffing company.

Gostomelsky plead guilty to receiving illegal gratuities from 1998 till approximately 2005 from another vendor that also provided service to the CMOP in Hines, Illinois. He further admitted that the illegal gratuities helped him give contracts to the vendor providing the illegal gratuities.

He was the director of the CMOP in Hines from 1995 until April 2007. He faced up to five years in prison and up to $250,000 fine for one count of conspiracy and up to two years of imprisonment and up to $250,000 fine for one count of accepting illegal gratuities. (But only served four months in exchange for assisting the government in a subordinate case). This plea agreement is subject to the court's approval.

=== Fraudulent Markup of Tamper-Evident Tape ===
On November 29, 2005, two employees at the Murfreesboro, Tennessee CMOP, Joseph Haymond and Natalie Coker, were indicted for accepting kickbacks from a vendor selling what was supposed to be tamper-evident red tape. In addition, vendor R. Michael Walsh was indicted.

From about August 1999 to July 2001, R Michael Walsh sold more than 100,000 rolls of red tape to the CMOP. Walsh paid his supplier about $2.50 per roll of tape, but Haymond instructed Walsh to charge the CMOP $6.51 per roll, a markup of more than 150%, and to give Haymond and Coker a kickback of $1.00 each for every roll of tape he sold to the CMOP. Coker and Haymond instructed CMOP employees to buy the tape in increments of less than $2,500 so that the CMOP employees could use their government credit cards, thereby avoiding using the VA's Acquisition Service Center. Coker and Haymond each received more than $100,000 in kickbacks from Walsh related to the red tape he sold to the CMOP at inflated prices.

On November 30, 2005, Haymond died of a self-inflicted gunshot wound outside his home in Auburntown, Tennessee. The case against him was dismissed on December 7, 2005.

On March 24, 2006, Walsh plead guilty to one count of conspiracy to defraud the United States.

Coker was charged with one count of conspiracy to defraud the United States, three counts of acceptance of bribes by a public official and one count of having a conflict of interest by participating as a government official in a matter involving a company with whom she was negotiating for prospective employment in violation of Title 18, United States Code, Sections 371, 201(b)(2) and 208(a) and 216(a)(2), respectively. On March 24, 2006, Coker plead guilty to the conflict of interest charge. Coker began serving a 46-month prison sentence at Alderson Federal Prison on December 18, 2006. With time off for good behavior she will be eligible for release sometime in April, 2010. The January minutes of the Tennessee Department of Commerce and Insurance disciplinary board shows that Natalie Coker's pharmacy license has been revoked due to "unprofessional conduct".

The third defendant in the case to plead guilty, Robert Michael Walsh, received 36 months probation and will be required to make restitution in the sum of $263,620. Walsh was given consideration for his complete cooperation and was given financial credit for having paid excess income tax of approximately $120,000. He had paid taxes on the kickbacks given to the other conspirators along with his own profit.

During Walsh's sentencing hearing it was brought out that the last conspirator who received monies from this enterprise, Dick Pruitt, has not been charged with any criminal offense. Dick Pruitt accepted about $20,000 from the scheme but was bought out early on by Walsh.

== Sources ==
- US House of Representatives, Committee on Veterans Affairs, Subcommittee on Oversight and Investigations. May 25, 2000. Testimony of John E. Ogden, M.S. Chief Consultant for Pharmacy Benefits Management, Department of Veterans Affairs. VA's Consolidated Mail Output Pharmacy Program.
- United States of America v. Joseph Haymond, Case 3:05–03107. United States District Court, Middle Tennessee District, Nashville Division.
- United States of America v. Natalie Coker and R. Michael Walsh, Case 3:05-00232. United States District Court, Middle Tennessee District, Nashville Division.
- "VA Suspect Takes Own Life". The Daily News Journal, Murfreesboro, Tennessee. December 1, 2005.
- United States District Court for Middle District of Tennessee at Nashville - Transcripts from the Sentencing hearings of Natalie Coker and Robert Michael Walsh.
- Department of Justice, "Illinois Veterans Affairs Official Pleads Guilty to Conspiracy and Accepting Illegal Gratuities" June 30, 2008 www.usdoj.gov
- Department of Veterans Affairs Office of Inspector General, Audit of Consolidated Mail Outpatient Pharmacy Contract Management, Report No. 09-00026-143, June 10, 2009
