= Shawsheen River =

River in the U.S. state of Massachusetts

Coordinates: 42.7053°N 71.1403°W

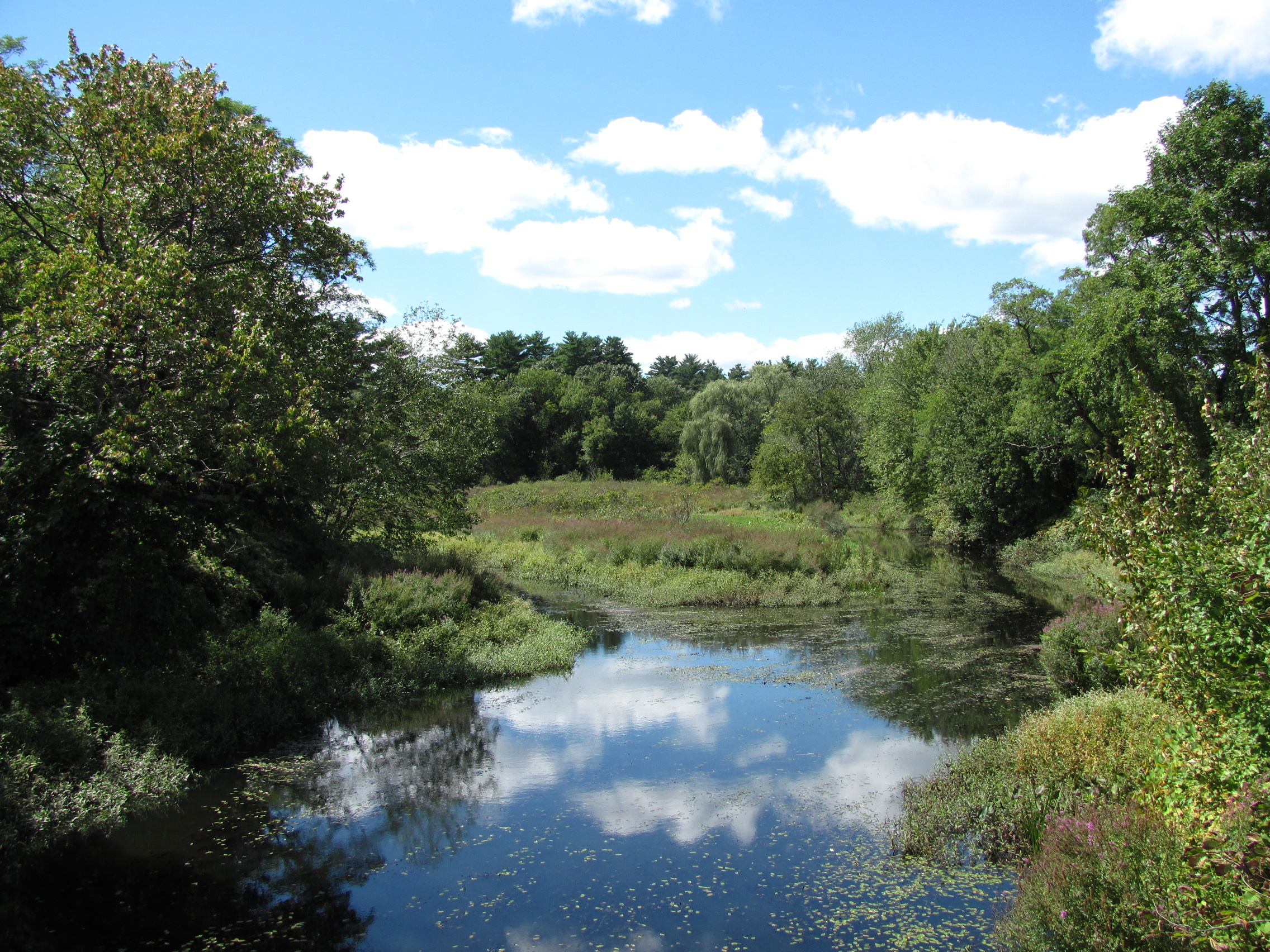
The Shawsheen River in Billerica

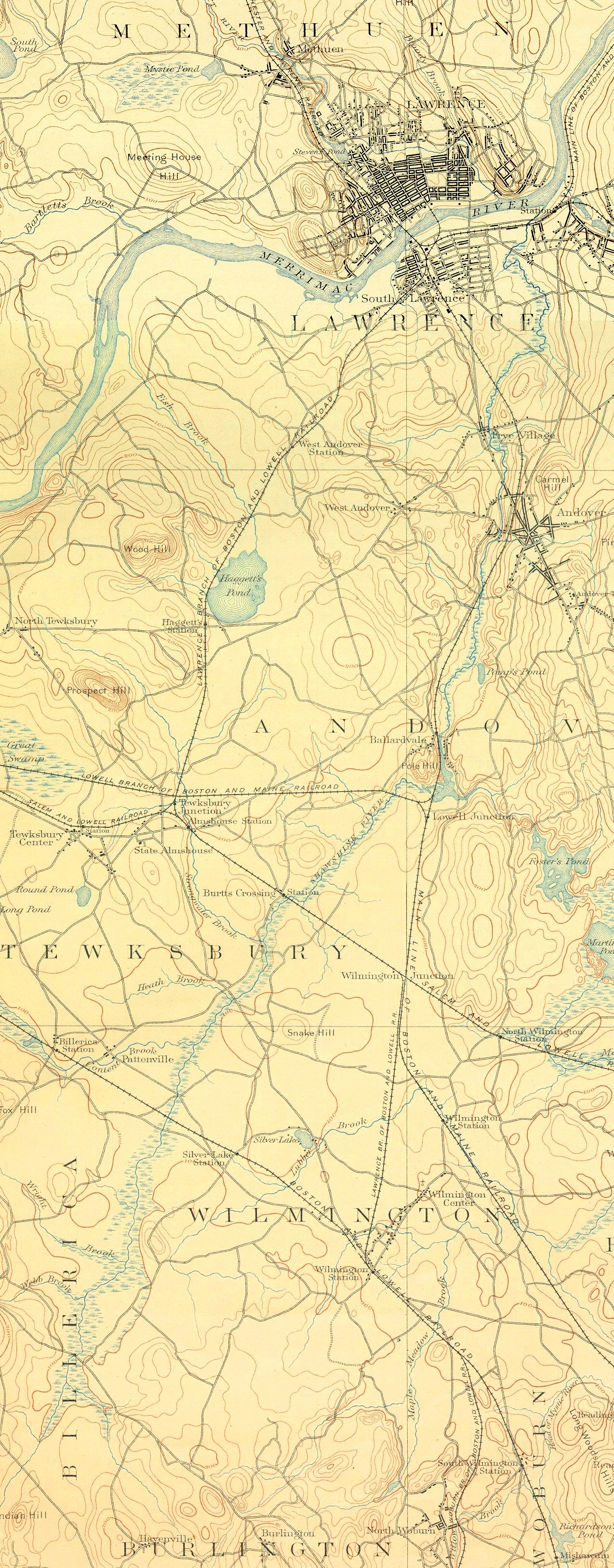
Shawsheen River

The Shawsheen River is a 26.7-mile-long (43.0 km) tributary of the Merrimack River in northeast Massachusetts. The name has had various spellings. According to Bailey's history of Andover, the spelling Shawshin was the most common in the old records, although Shawshine, Shashin, Shashine, Shashene, Shawshene, and later, Shawsheen, are found. The name, says Bailey, is said to mean "Great Spring".

The river runs generally northward through the towns of Bedford, Billerica, Wilmington, Tewksbury, Andover, and Lawrence, where it joins the Merrimack. Like its parent, the river has played an important role in the development of the area, including industrial development, with many mills built to take advantage of the river's power. Today there are trails and parks located along several sections of the river, and a preservation effort is carried out by the Shawsheen River Watershed Association.

In June 2001, the Merrimack River Watershed Council determined that the Shawsheen River failed to meet water quality standards. This situation was largely attributed to stormwater runoff via town, private and state storm drain systems. As a result of increased pollutants, major portions of the Shawsheen River are now listed as impaired waters on the 303(d) list of the Clean Water Act.

The removal of the Marland Place Dam (originally built in the 1700s) and Balmoral Dam (originally built in the 1920s) allowed alewife and blueback herring to spawn upstream to the Ballardvale Dam in spring 2017, for the first time in over 200 years.
