= Europa Jeep =

European multinational military vehicle project

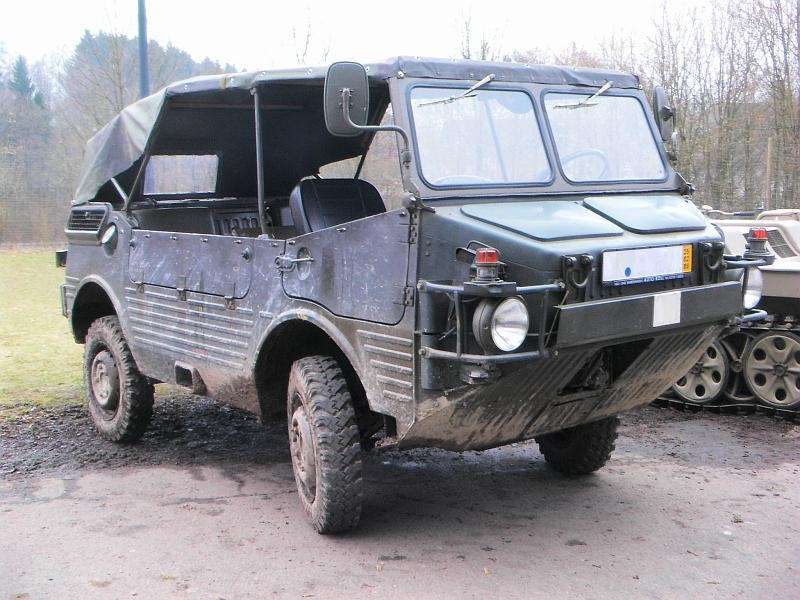
Europa-Jeep Fiat-MAN-Saviem with cab over engine

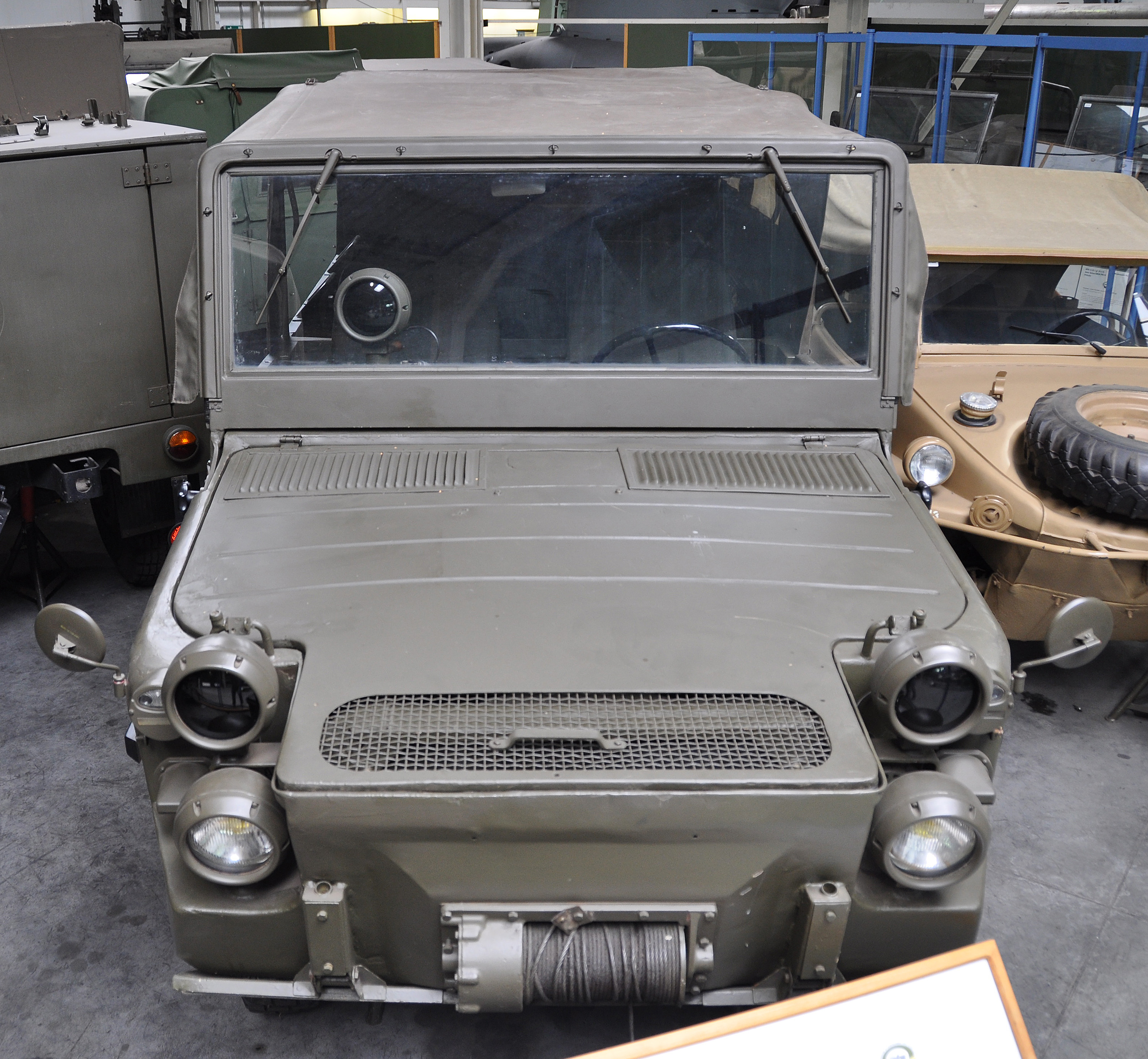
Hotchkiss-Büssing-Lancia Europa-Jeep front view

The Europa Jeep, actually Vehicule de Commandement et de Liaison VCL, was a multinational military vehicle project that was ultimately abandoned before it could enter production.

During the 1960s, several European governments began cooperating on development of a design by committee vehicle known as the Europa Jeep, a lightweight, amphibious four-wheel drive vehicle that could be mass-produced for use by various national military and government groups. Development of the vehicle proved time-consuming, however, and by 1979 the project had been abandoned.

The West German government, having acquired the DKW Munga in the 1950s with a by now outdated two stroke engine, was in need of a limited number of light, inexpensive, durable transport vehicles that could fulfill their basic needs while the Europa Jeep was being developed and put into production. Volkswagen had not entered the 1950s tender with a new Volkswagen Kübelwagen, and the Porsche 597 had been considered to expensive. Volkswagen, still partially owned by authorities, was instead instructed by the West German government to create the Volkswagen 181. After the abandonment of the Europa Jeep when France left in 1976, a number of NATO countries also adopted the 181 or the Volkswagen Iltis Type 183 (also built as Citroën C-44) or the Mercedes-Benz G-Class Wolf (also made as Peugeot P4).

The Bundeswehr Museum of German Defense Technology in Koblenz has prototypes of Europa Jeeps in the exhibition.

A total of three countries were allied to manufacture the Europa Jeep, including West Germany, France and Italy. A total of six manufacturers were selected to produce the vehicle including Fiat, MAN, and Saviem, and Hotchkiss, Büssing, and Lancia with Vehicule de Commandement et de Liaison VCL guidelines which needed to comply with the same specifications.

== Specifications ==
- Engine: Multifuel
- Power: 40-50HP
- Speed: 95 kmph
- Range: 800 Km
- Payload: 500 Kg
- Drivetrain: 4x4
- Trailer Load: 750 Kg
- Weight: Below 1.5 Ton

With these specifications the vehicle needed to be amphibious, off-road worthy and durable enough to be air dropped. After the selection of the best model a total of 50,000 unit were to be built for each country which never happened.

== See also ==
- Volkswagen 181
- Citroën C44
- Peugeot P4
- Volkswagen Iltis
- Willys MB
