= Design by committee =

Term for a visionless project

Design by committee is a pejorative term for a project that has many designers involved but no unifying plan or vision.

== Usage of the term ==
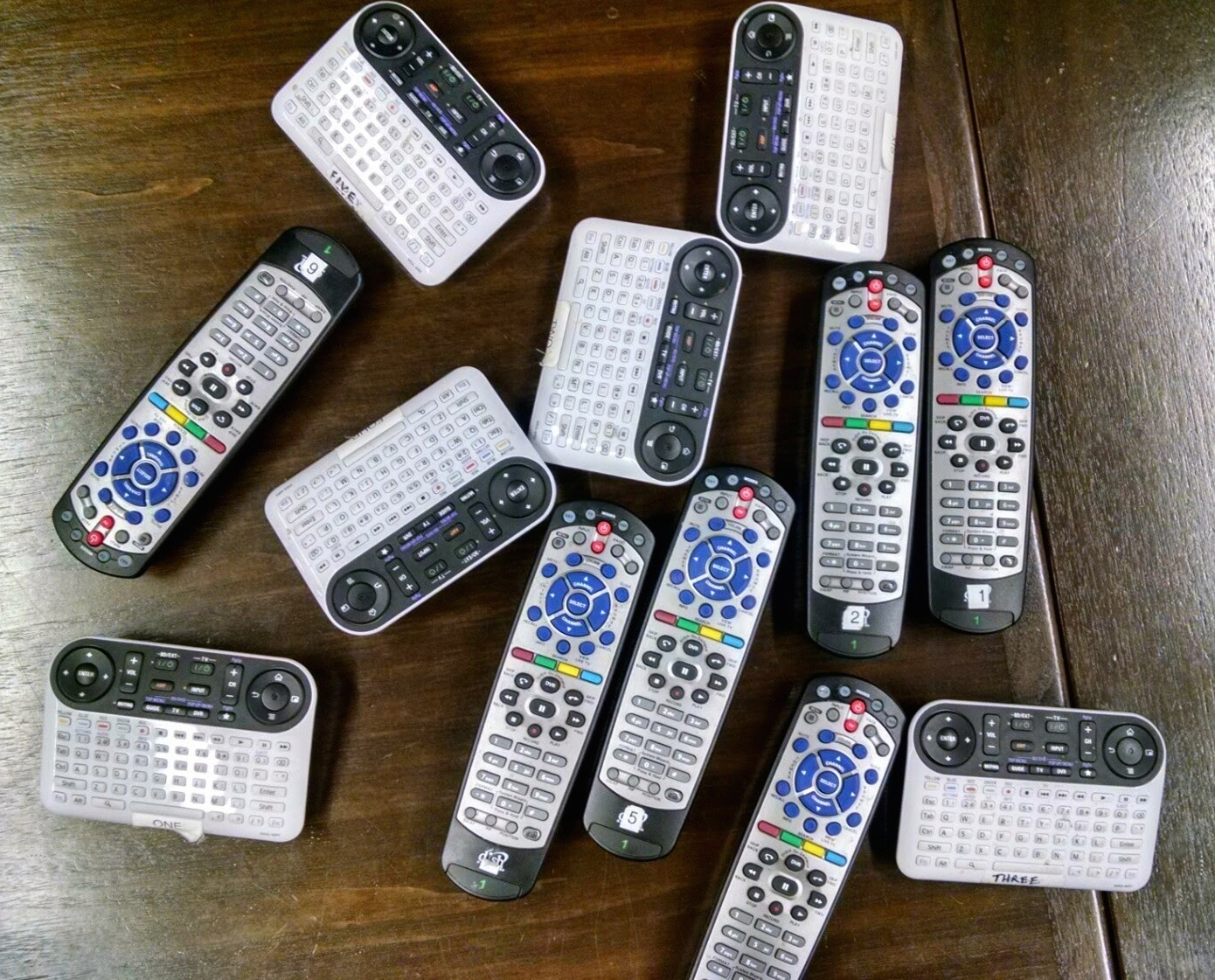
Remote controls with as many as 78 buttons have been cited as an example of a product designed by committee.

The term is used to refer to suboptimal traits that such a process may produce as a result of having to compromise between the requirements and viewpoints of the participants, particularly in the presence of poor leadership or poor technical knowledge, such as needless complexity, internal inconsistency, logical flaws, banality, and the lack of a unifying vision. This design process by consensus is in contrast to autocratic design, or design by dictator, where the project leader decides on the design. The difference is that in an autocratic style, members of the organizations are not included and the final outcome is the responsibility of the leader. The phrase, "a camel is a horse designed by committee" is often used to describe design by committee.

The term is especially common in technical parlance; and stresses the need for technical quality over political feasibility. The proverb "too many cooks spoil the broth" expresses the same idea. The term is also common in other fields of design such as graphic design, architecture or industrial design. In automotive design, this process is often blamed for unpopular or poorly designed cars.

== Examples ==
The term is commonly used in information and communications technology, especially when referring to the design of languages and technical standards, as demonstrated by USENET archives.

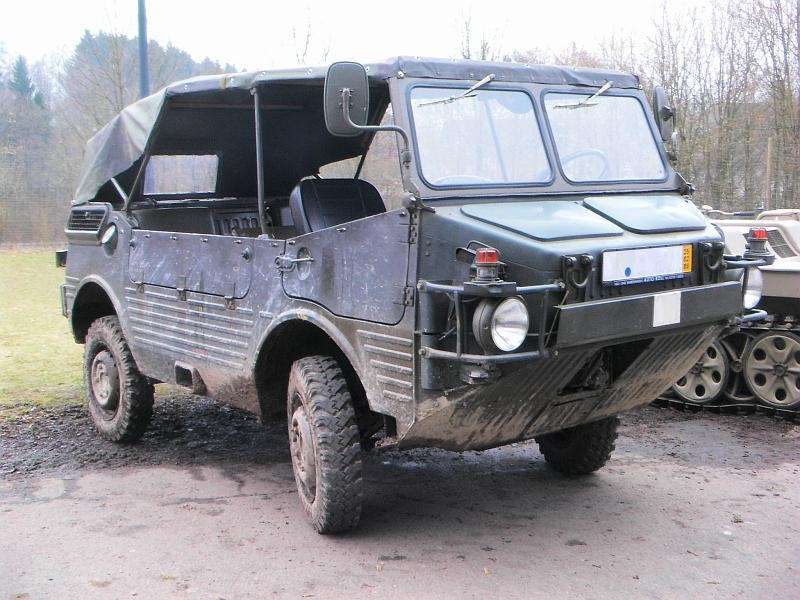
Europa-Jeep by Fiat-MAN-Saviem with cab over engine

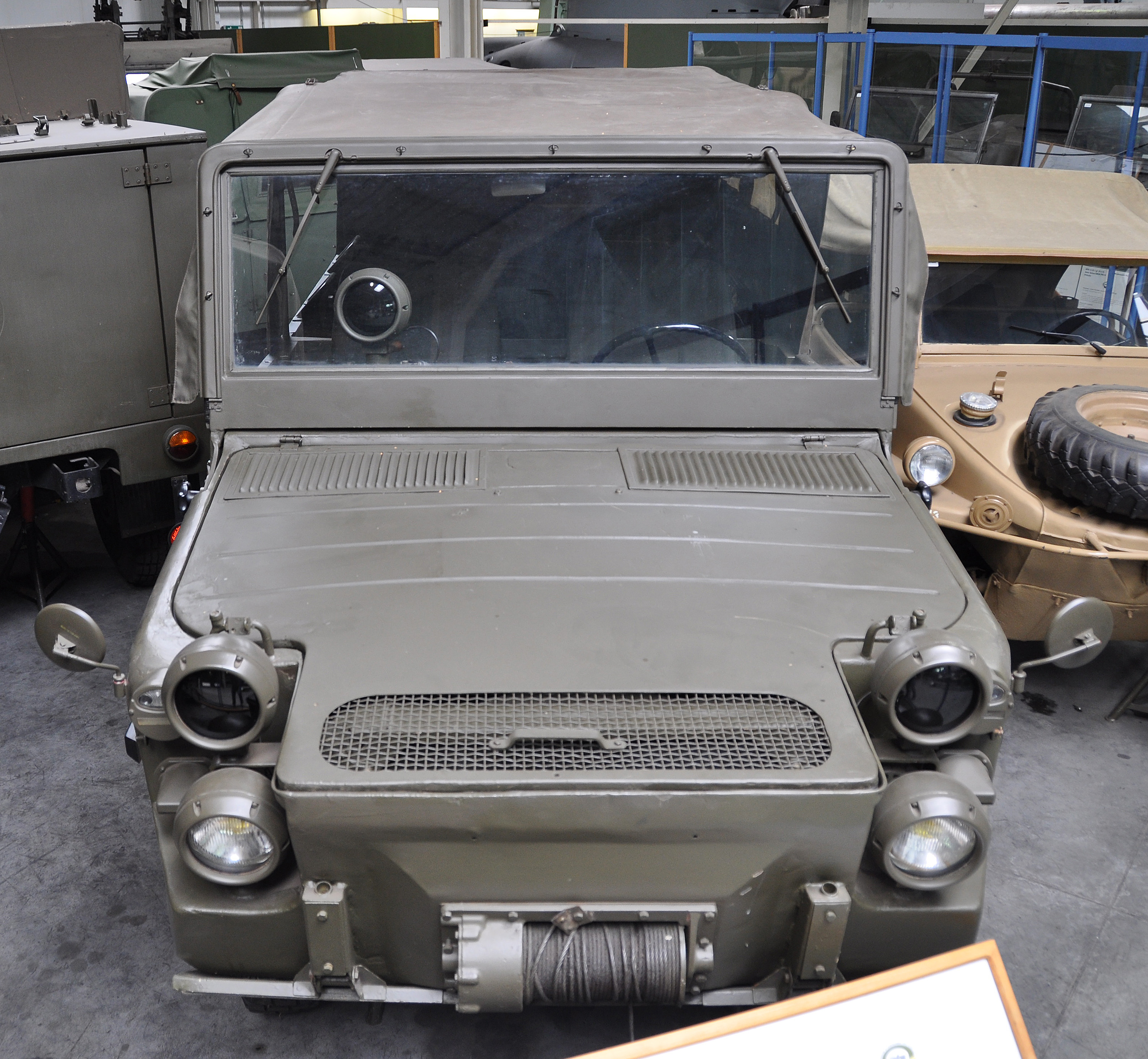
Europa Jeep by Hotchkiss-Büssing-Lancia

In the 1960s and 1970s, several European governments began cooperating on development of a design by committee vehicle known as the Europa Jeep, a lightweight, amphibious air-drop four-wheel drive vehicle that should be mass-produced for use by various national military and government groups, by companies like Fiat, MAN, Saviem, Hotchkiss, Büssing, and Lancia. In 1968, Germany ordered some Beetle-based Volkswagen Type 181 as stop-gap, and at the end, the Volkswagen Iltis Type 183 was also made with French engines.

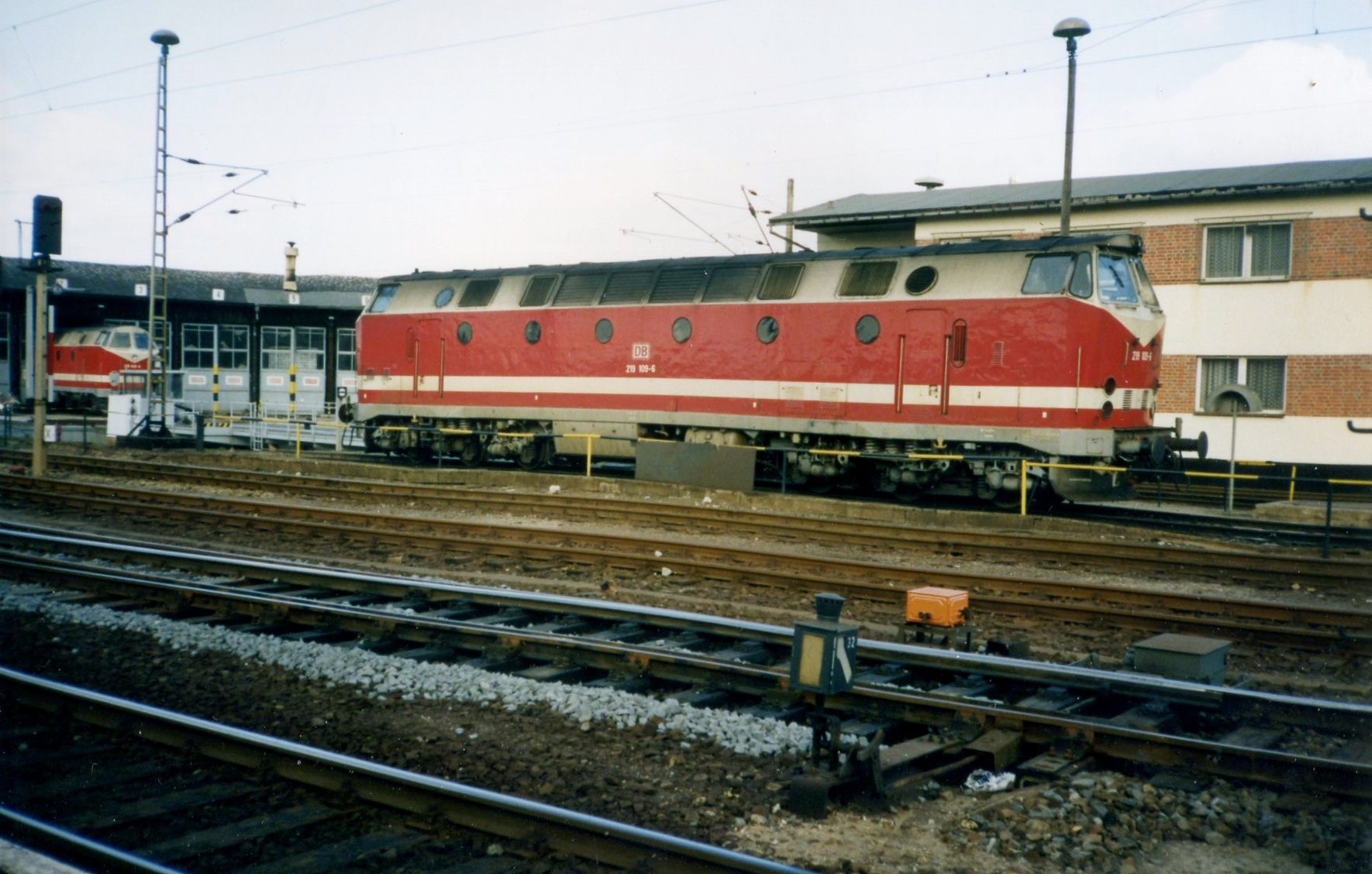
DR Class 119 diesel locomotive built 1976 to 1985 in communist Romania for East Germany

An alleged example is the DR Class 119 diesel locomotive, built from 1976 to 1985 in communist Romania for East Germany due to Soviet-era Comecon restrictions. Only the USSR was allowed to continue building powerful diesel engines, but they were too heavy for East Germany where some lines were limited to low axle load locomotives. Not allowed to continue building their own designs, the East Germans managed to have Romanian 23 August Works assemble a successor to the DR Class 118. With a mixture of parts from several planned economy countries, even including West German designs to fill gaps, the Class 119 was unreliable. Only 200 were built in ten years as East Germany cancelled the contract prematurely. No other country purchased the Class 119, but after 1990 unified German rail had to deal with them until they were replaced.

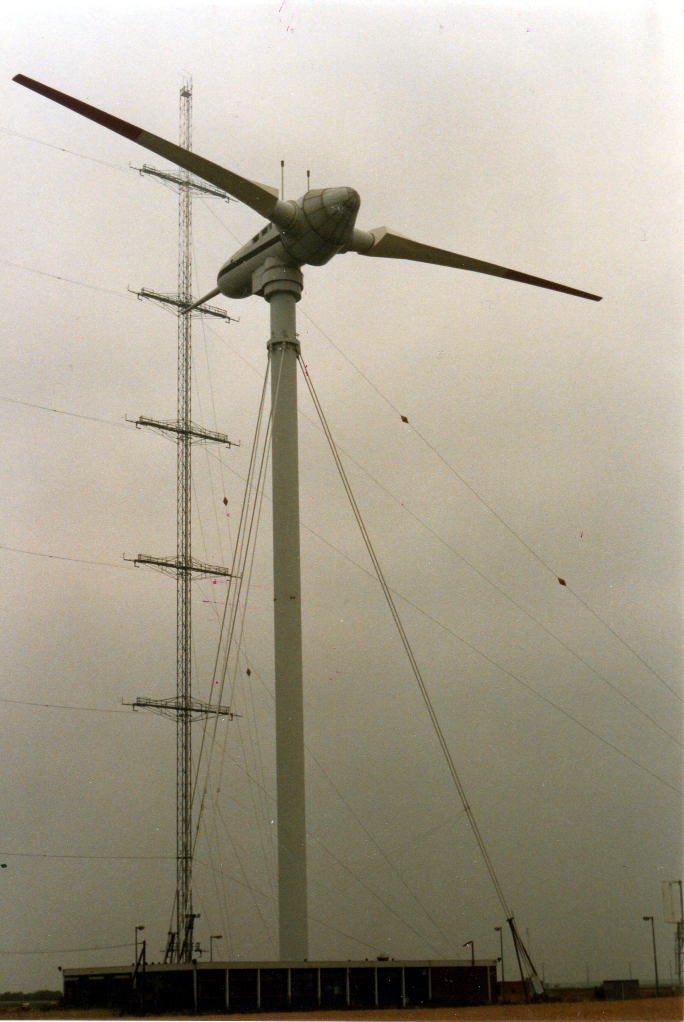
Growian, the world's largest wind turbine in 1984, designed to fail by some committee members

Also in 1976, but in West Germany, a publicly funded project involving several partners for a large wind turbine was started. Growian was a two-bladed "lee runner" (the rotor was situated on the downwind side of the tower) with a hub height of about 100 metres (330 ft). At 3 Megawatt, it topped designs in Denmark and by NASA, and was the world's largest at the time in History of wind power, being operated from 1983 to 1988. Several of the partners involved, some of them in coal power and nuclear power business, publicly expressed interest in the project to fail, which it duly did. It delayed the progress of Wind power in Germany and Energiewende (German for 'energy turnaround') by two decades.

An example of a technical decision said to be a typical result of design by committee is the Asynchronous Transfer Mode (ATM) cell size of 53 bytes. The choice of 53 bytes was political rather than technical. When the CCITT was standardizing ATM, parties from the United States wanted a 64-byte payload. Parties from Europe wanted 32-byte payloads. Most of the European parties eventually came around to the arguments made by the Americans, but France and a few others held out for a shorter cell length of 32 bytes. A 53-byte size (48 bytes plus 5 byte header) was the compromise chosen.

An example described as naming by committee was a school near Liverpool formed by the merger of several other schools: it was officially named the "Knowsley Park Centre for Learning, Serving Prescot, Whiston and the Wider Community" in 2009, listing as a compromise all the schools and communities merged into it. The name lasted seven years before its headmistress, who called the name "so embarrassing", cut it to simply "The Prescot School".

The F-35 Joint Strike Fighter has been described as designed by committee, due to being overscheduled, over budget, and underperforming expectations. It was originally conceived to serve the widely varying needs of multiple branches of the military all in one simple platform. This multi-interest approach has been pinpointed as largely responsible for its bloat, along with stacking too many new and unproven features into its design. Uneven progress across areas and unexpected challenges meant that major technical fixes and redesigns could halt the program's movement, requiring planes to be remedied even as they were being delivered.

The C++ programming language has been described as such by computer scientist Ken Thompson., especially with how it was designed by an actual committee (ie. the ISO/IEC JTC 1/SC 22)

Apple Inc. reportedly uses remote controls designed by other companies with as many as 78 buttons as an example of design by committee when training employees.

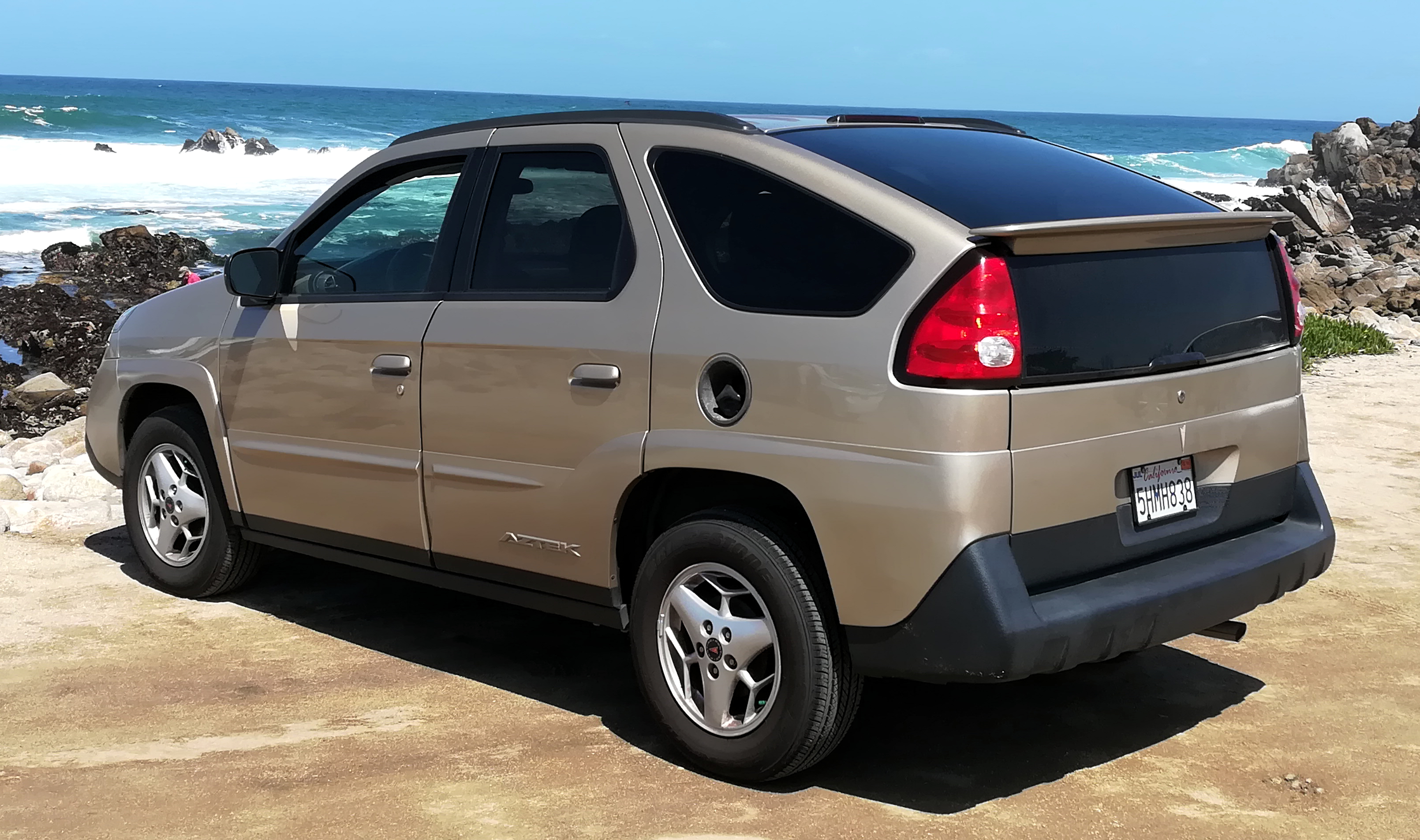
The poor reception and commercial failure of the Pontiac Aztek was attributed to design by committee.

The Washington Post described the Pontiac Aztek as a vehicle designed by committee, which was largely designed based on feedback from extensive focus group testing, and was released to negative reviews and poor sales.

== See also ==
- Condorcet paradox
- Groupthink
- Blind men and an elephant
- Wisdom of the crowd
- Tiger team
- Overengineering
