= Volkswagen Iltis =

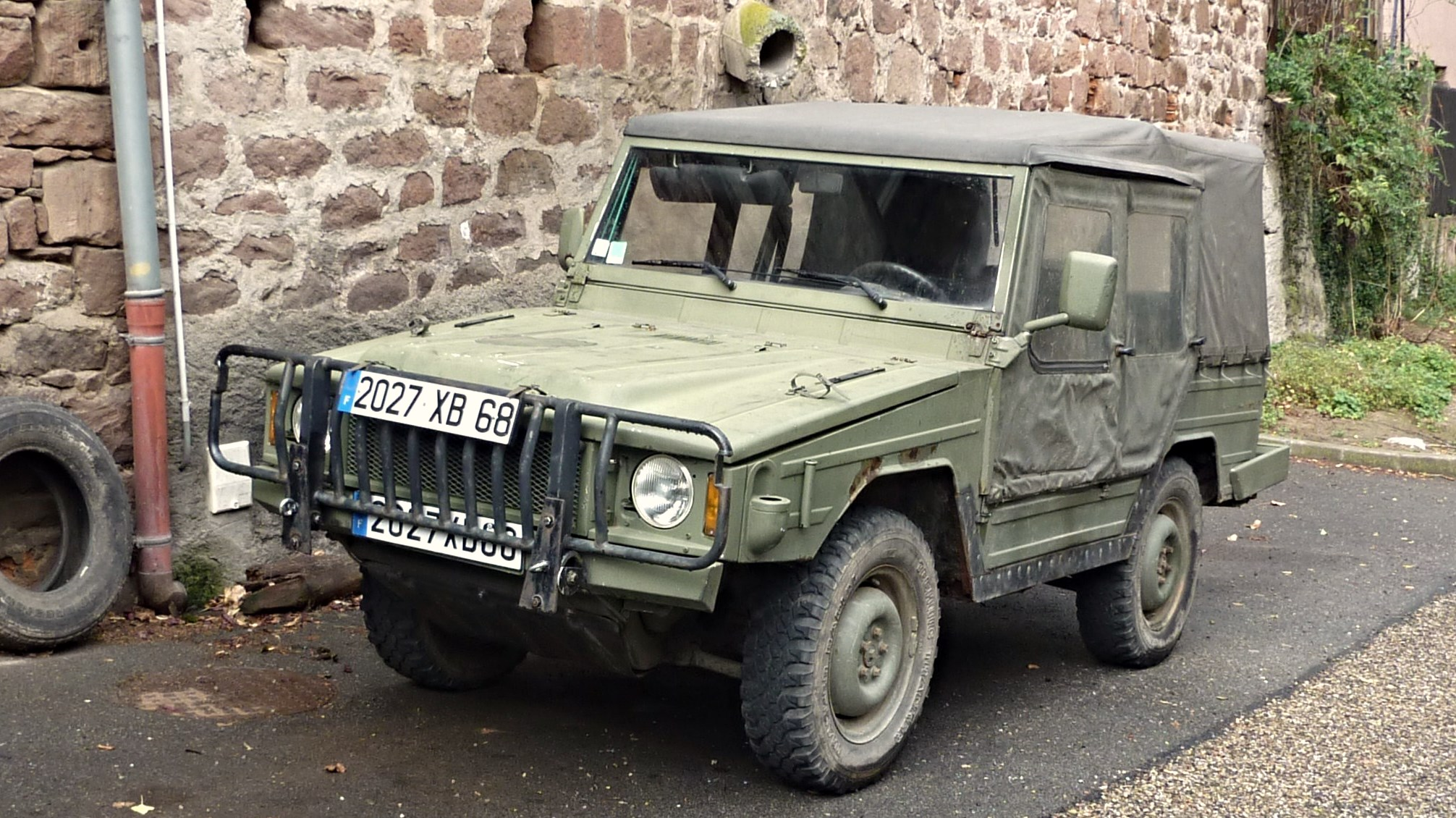
- Type: Light utility vehicle
- Place of origin: West Germany

Service history
- Used by: See Operators

Production history
- Manufacturer: Volkswagen; Bombardier Inc.
- Produced: 1978–1988
- No. built: 9,547 built

Specifications
- Mass: 1,300 kg (2,900 lb)
- Length: 3,880 mm (153 in)
- length: 2,020 mm (80 in)
- Main armament: MG3, FN MAG or M2 Browning machine guns
- Engine: 1.7 L I4; 1.6 L diesel I4
- Transmission: Front engine, four wheel drive

The Volkswagen Type 183, more commonly known as the Iltis (German for polecat), is a military light utility vehicle designed and manufactured by Volkswagen in the 1970s-80s for use by the West German military. The vehicle was also produced under licence in Canada by Bombardier Inc. for use by the militaries of Canada and Belgium.

Although the two vehicles were briefly offered simultaneously, the Type 183 effectively replaced the Type 181.

== History ==
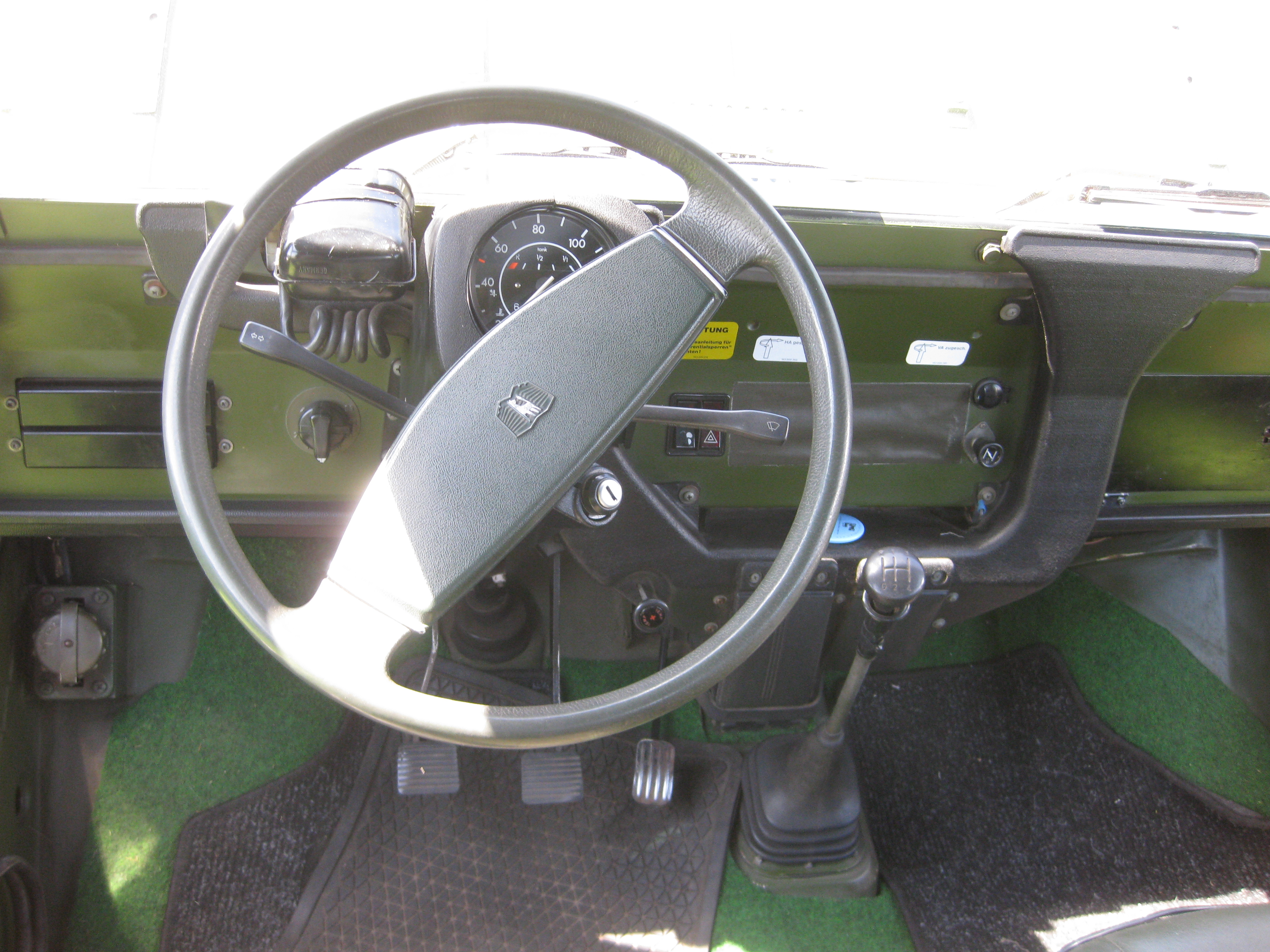
Driver’s position

West Germany’s military (the Bundeswehr) had been part of a cooperative effort, beginning in the late 1960s, to create what was dubbed the "Europa Jeep", an amphibious four wheel drive vehicle that could replace the small all-terrain transport vehicles being used by several of the participating governments’ armed forces. With development taking longer than expected, the Bundeswehr requested something inexpensive to be built in small quantities to fill their need for additional small transport vehicles while the Europa Jeep project was still undergoing design research. Volkswagen (VW) responded to the request, designing an updated version of their Kübelwagen and designating it the Type 181. By 1979, the Europa Jeep project had fallen apart completely, the victim of skyrocketing costs and difficult development. Needing a suitable four-wheel drive vehicle to take over the gaps in the Bundeswehr's vehicle fleets that had been designated for the Europa Jeep, the West German government issued requests to several manufacturers to design and build prototype vehicles to be considered for military use.

Prior to the advent of the Type 181, the West German military had purchased several thousand DKW Mungas, a light utility vehicle manufactured by DKW, but the production of the Munga had ended in 1968. Volkswagen had then consolidated the former Auto Union marques, of which DKW was one, into a single company, re-using the Audi name to designate vehicles manufactured by the company rather than continuing to manufacture vehicles under the names of the various brands that had made up the original Auto Union.

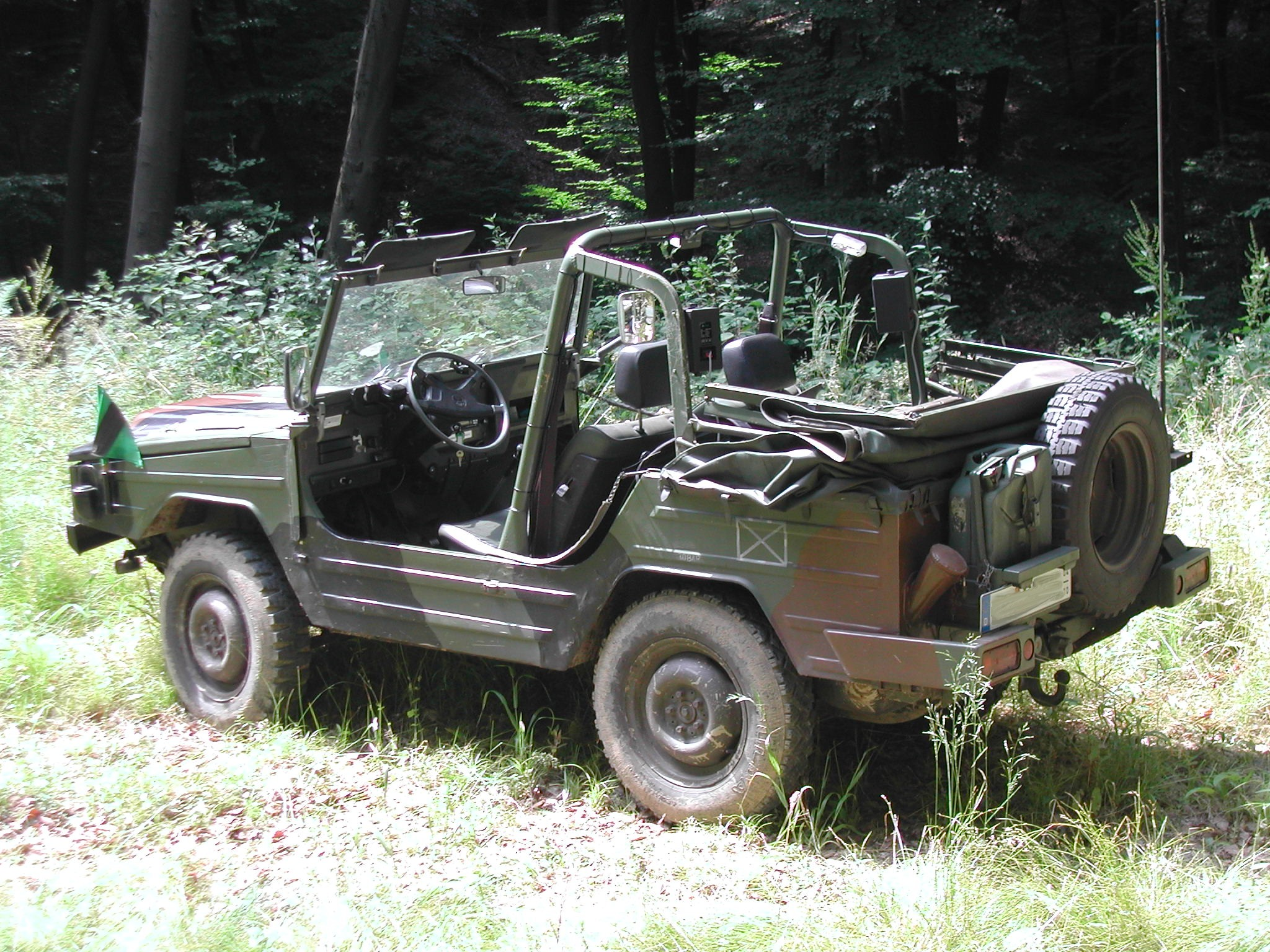
Rear view

Wanting to immediately begin making use of the technologies they had acquired in the Auto Union purchase, VW chose to participate in the competition to provide the next new German military vehicle by creating an evolution of the Munga jeep, which had been out of production for several years by that time. The Bundeswehr were anxious to replace the outdated machine with its two-stroke engine. The resultant prototype combined old technologies with new, and executives decided to badge the product as a VW rather than as an Audi in the hopes that this would help promote positive linking to the existing VW military designs and give them an advantage over their competition.

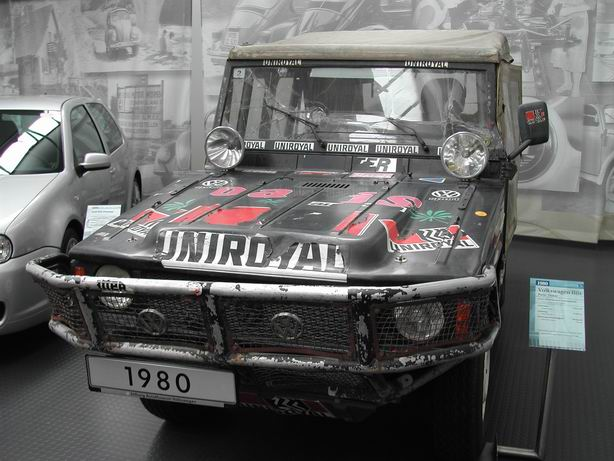
Paris-Dakar Rally winner of 1980

The vehicle, developed by Audi, featured a variation of the Munga's platform with newly modified suspension components, a four-wheel-drive system based around components from the Audi 100, and a 1.7 litre four-cylinder Volkswagen engine producing 75 PS (55 kW). The design of this four-wheel drive system provided the basis for Audi's quattro system, which debuted four years later, in 1980, on the original Audi Quattro.

The Iltis, as VW was now calling it, passed the German government's tests with ease, and was chosen over the equally competent but more expensive Puch G / Mercedes-Benz G-Wagen. Production began in the summer of 1978 and the first 200 vehicles were delivered in November; by late 1979 approximately 2,000 had been delivered, with 310 vehicles sent to the Luftwaffe (the West German air force) and 20 sent to the West German navy, the Bundesmarine. Most of the vehicles produced were four-doored with open tops; ambulance and other vehicles for use in anti-tank, artillery survey, command and field communications roles with varying body styles were produced in small numbers.

A civilian model was also offered, mostly in West Germany. It was first shown at the 1979 Geneva Motor Show and entered production soon thereafter, originally only with a utilitarian soft top. In 1980 Freddy Kottulinsky and Gerd Löffelmann won the Paris-Dakar Rally in an Audi-prepared Iltis. The civilian Iltis found even fewer takers than the 181 had, largely due to price and its utilitarian nature.

=== Bombardier Iltis ===
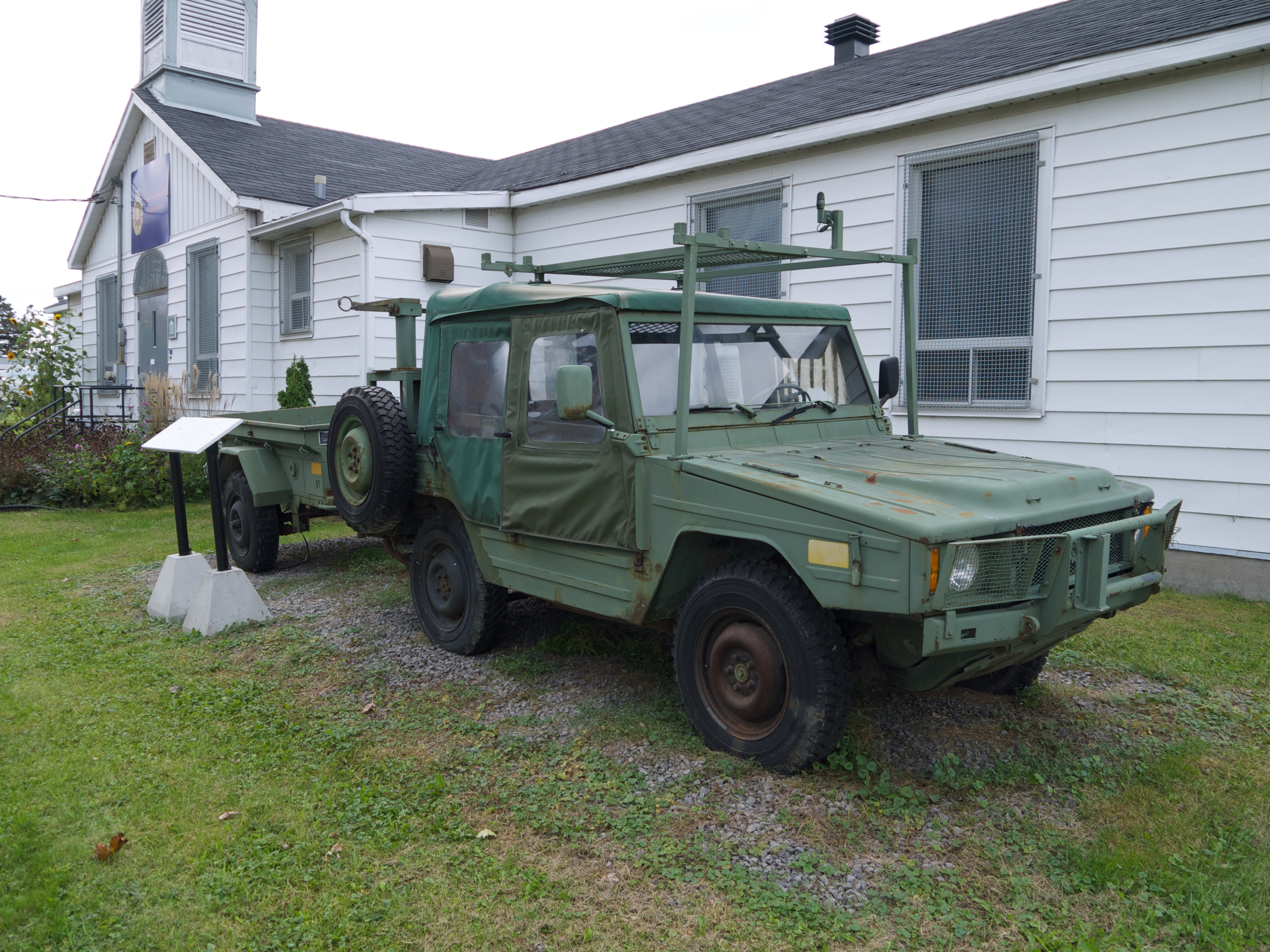
A former Canadian Forces Iltis at the Canadian Forces Logistics Museum, hitched to a trailer and mounting various modifications.

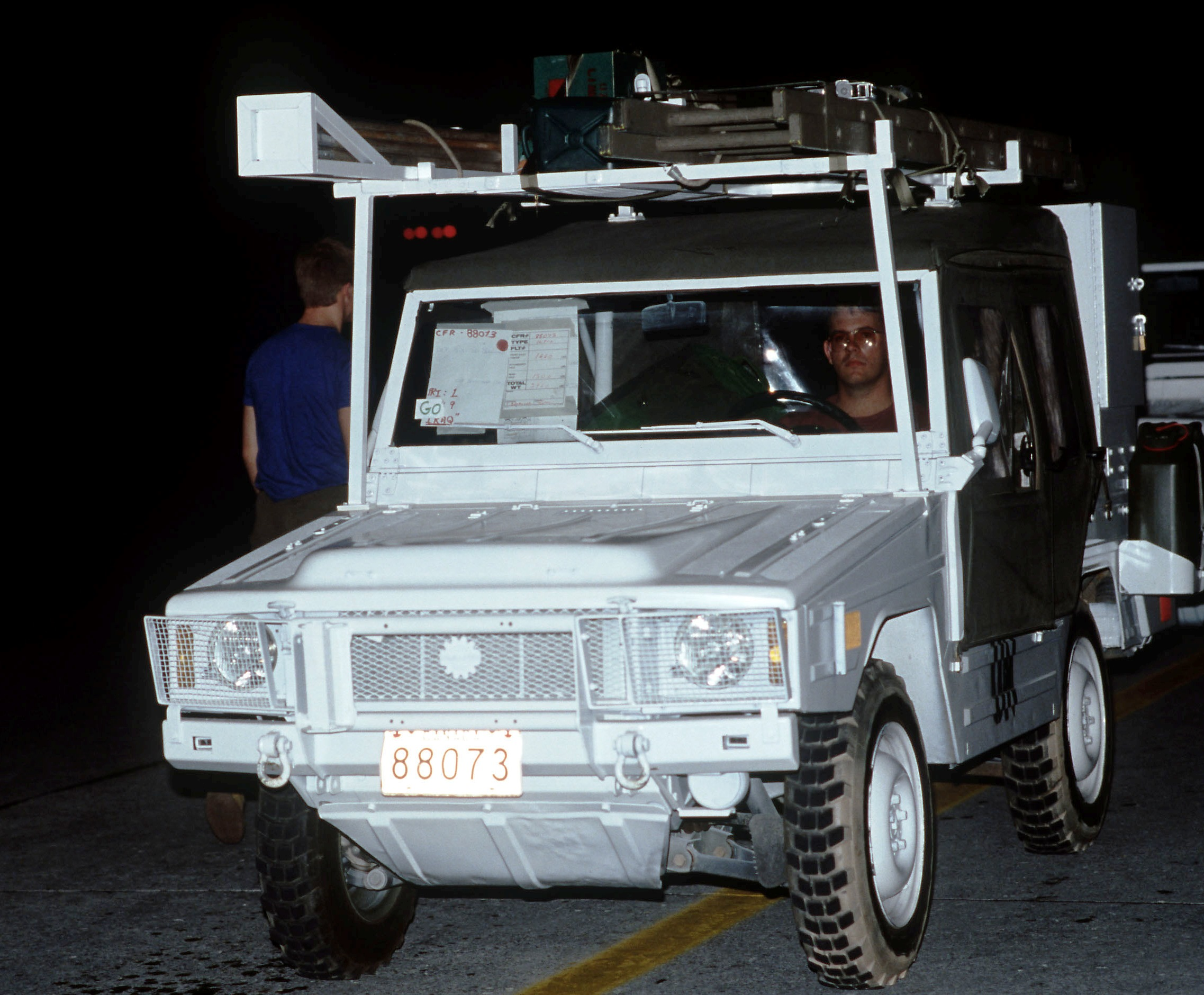
Canadian Iltis painted white for a UN mission

Volkswagen announced the construction of a C$100 million plant to be constructed after Bombardier received the rights to manufacture the Iltis in Canada. Volkswagen picked Barrie, Ontario, at first, but agreed to allow the vehicles to be constructed in Valcourt, Quebec, instead.

In 1983, the Canadian government announced the purchase of 1,900 Iltises for C$68 million, with a grant of C$1.3 million to expand the production line and C$700,000 grant for Bombardier to manufacture and market a civilian version of the Iltis. In 1984, Bombardier-made Iltises were sold to Belgium. In 1985, Ottawa purchased 600 Iltises under a C$15 million contract. Bombardier production of the Iltis was halted by 1986.

== Specifications ==
The engine has a low 8.2: 1 compression ratio, allowing it to run on low-octane gasoline. The four-wheel drive is engaged by a lever on the floor, as are the optional differential locks. The car has rack-and-pinion steering and many suspension parts are the same at all four corners. The interior is minimal, although the seats, from the contemporary Volkswagen Passat, were considered surprisingly comfortable by period observers. The tiny back seat has two individually folding seatbacks, but can be considered mainly an occasional seat.

=== The Iltis with Citroën engine ===
In the late 1970s, the French government decided it was time to replace the aging fleet of Hotchkiss Jeeps in its military and like West Germany, called for offers. No French company had a fitting vehicle on hand and designing one from the ground up would have been too expensive so interested companies worked with the manufacturers that did have something to offer. Peugeot teamed up with Mercedes, installed 504 petrol or diesel engines in the G-Wagen and called it the P4 ("VLTT" originally); Saviem installed a 1647 cc Renault 20 engine in Fiat's Campagnola chassis and dubbed it the TRM500; and Citroën built the Citroën C-44, a Volkswagen Iltis-based vehicle powered by a 75 metric horsepower (55 kW) 1.8 litre Douvrin engine.

The P4 was awarded the contract and the other two projects were scrapped, but a team entered a C-44 in the 1981 Paris–Dakar Rally. It did not finish the race.

== Operators ==
- Argentina: Argentine Army
- Greece: Hellenic Army
- North Macedonia: Army of the Republic of North Macedonia

=== Former operators ===
- National Reorganization Process
- Belgium: 2,673 vehicles for the Belgian Land Component from Bombardier.
- Canada: 2,500 vehicles were ordered for the Canadian Forces to replace the existing fleets of M151A2, M38A1 and CJ-7 variants of the jeep before being replaced by the G-Wagon in the late 2000s. One Iltis known to be restored for display at the Canadian War Museum by the Corps of Royal Canadian Electrical and Mechanical Engineers workshops at Canadian Forces Base Ottawa and another is at the 15th Field Artillery Regiment Museum & Archives.
- Cameroon
- West Germany
- Latvia: at least 17 delivered to the Latvian National Armed Forces before 2004 and retired by 2019; one on display at the Mežaine training ground near Skrunda.
- Mali
- Republic of Macedonia / Macedonia
- Oman

== See also ==
- FMC XR311
- HMMWV
- Fabrique Nationale AS 24
- M151
