= Volkswagen Type 181 =

Small convertible utility vehicle

Volkswagen Type 181/182
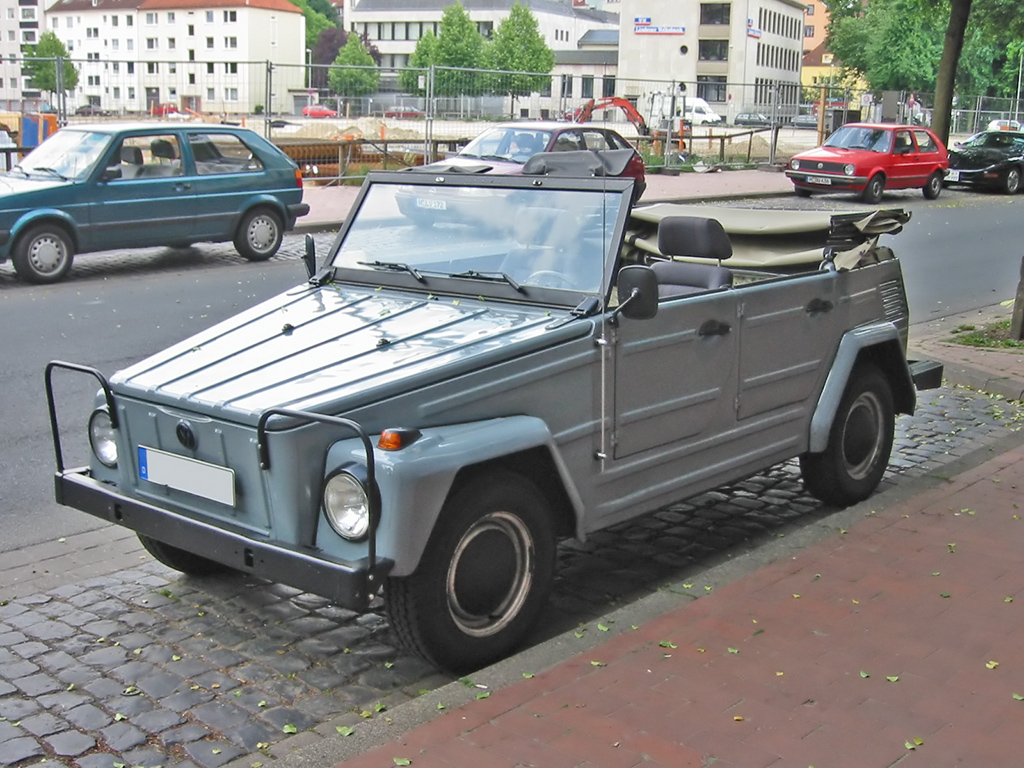
- Civil version with military shrub removers and custom seats

Overview
- Manufacturer: Volkswagen
- Also called: Volkswagen Type 181 (LHD) Volkswagen Type 182 (RHD); Sold as: Volkswagen Thing (United States); Volkswagen Camat (Indonesia); Volkswagen Safari (Mexico); Volkswagen Trekker (UK); Volkswagen Pescaccia (Italy)
- Production: 1968–1983 (from 1971 for civilian use); 90,883 built (70,519 in West Germany, 20,364 in Mexico)
- Assembly: West Germany: Wolfsburg (1968–1974); West Germany: Hannover (1974–1975); West Germany: Emden (1975–1978); Mexico: Puebla (1970–1980); Indonesia: Jakarta (1972–1980)

Body and chassis
- Class: Military vehicle
- Body style: 4-door cabriolet
- Layout: Rear-engined, rear-wheel drive

Powertrain
- Engine: 1.5 or 1.6l H4
- Transmission: 4-speed manual

Dimensions
- Wheelbase: 2,400 mm (94.5 in)
- Length: 3,780 mm (148.8 in)
- Width: 1,640 mm (64.6 in)
- Height: 1,620 mm (63.8 in)
- Curb weight: 910 kg (2,006 lb)

Chronology
- Predecessor: Volkswagen Kübelwagen
- Successor: Volkswagen Iltis (for military use); Volkswagen Touareg (for civilian use)

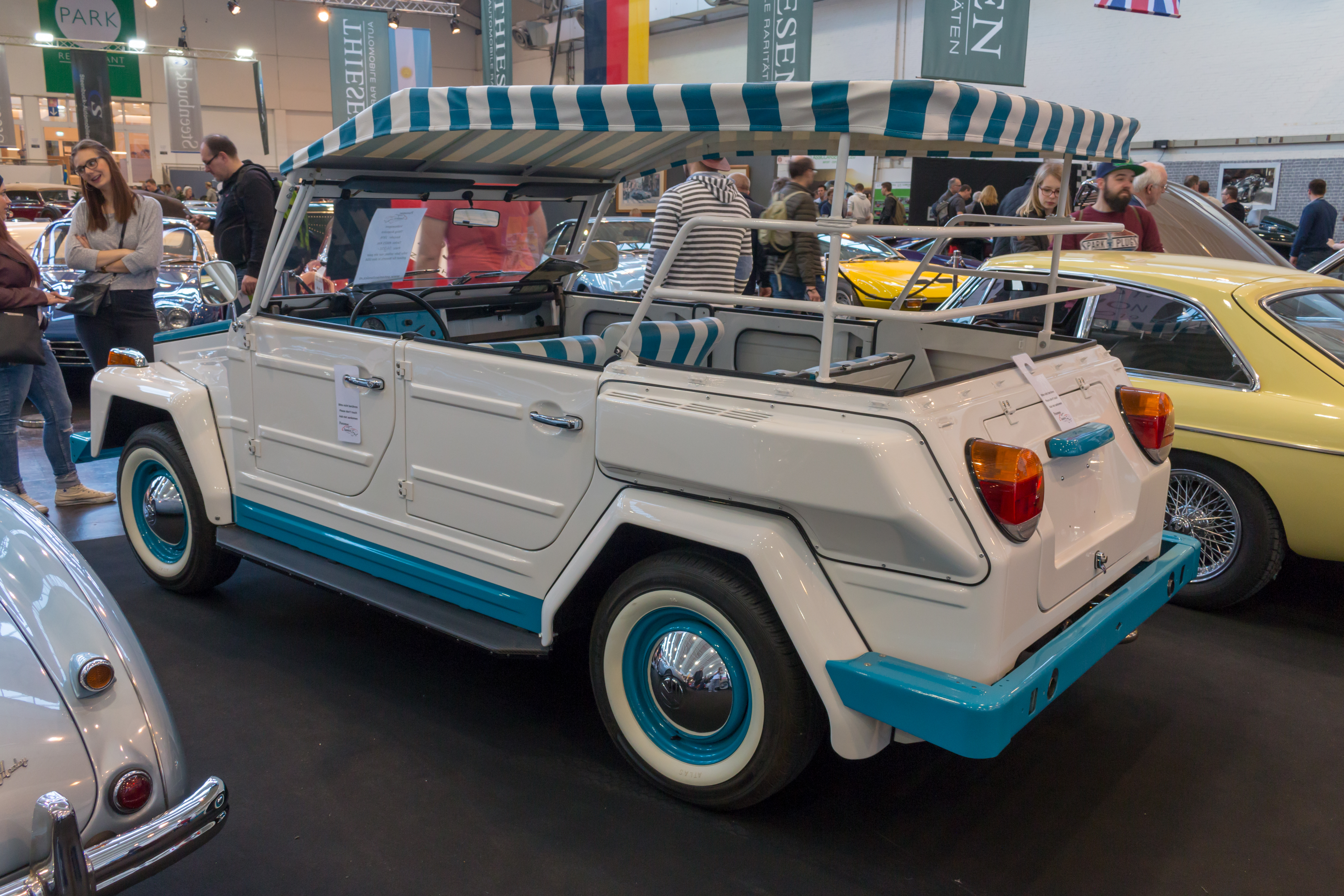
A 1974 "Acapulco" Thing

The Volkswagen Type 181 is a two-wheel drive, four-door convertible, manufactured and marketed by Volkswagen from 1968 until 1983. Originally developed for the West German Army as a successor to the 1956 Auto Union two-stroke–engined DKW Munga, the Type 181 also entered the civilian market as the Kurierwagen (“courier car”) in West Germany, the Trekker (RHD Type 182) in the United Kingdom, the Thing in the United States and Canada (1973–1974), the Safari in Mexico and South America, and Pescaccia in Italy. Civilian sales ended after model year 1980.

Manufactured in Wolfsburg, West Germany (1968–1974), Hannover, West Germany (1974–1975), Emden, West Germany (1975–1978), Puebla, Mexico (1970–1980), and Jakarta, Indonesia (1972–1980), the Type 181 shared its mechanicals with Volkswagen's Type 1 (Beetle) and the pre-1968 Volkswagen Microbus, its floor pan with the Type 1 Karmann Ghia, and its concept with the company's Kübelwagen, which had been used by the German military during World War II.

The overall configuration loosely recalls the chic, open beach cars of the 1960s, including the BMC Mini Moke, Fiat Ghia Jolly, Renault Rodeo, Citroën Méhari and Meyers Manx. All four doors were removable and interchangeable, the windshield folded flat, and the convertible roof could be removed for al fresco driving. The spartan interior featured vinyl covered bucket seats, painted sheet metal, drain holes and perforated rubber mats. A fiberglass hardtop and trunk-mounted auxiliary heater were optional.

== History ==
A 1953 tender for a future West German Army was won by Auto Union that had developed the DKW Munga from their Two-stroke engine vehicles DKW 3=6 and DKW Schnellaster. The Porsche 597 was considered too expensive, and Volkswagen itself did not enter with a new Volkswagen Kübelwagen. By the 1960s, the simple two-stroke concept became outdated, and as the DKW brand was associated with it, Auto Union dropped it in 1965 in favour of reintroducing the brand Audi when updating the DKW F102 to the four stroke Audi F103 that used the Mercedes-Benz M118 engine.

During the 1960s, several European governments began cooperating on development of a vehicle known as the Europa Jeep, a lightweight, amphibious four-wheel drive vehicle that could be mass-produced for use by various national military and government groups. Development of the design by committee vehicle proved time-consuming, however, and the West German government was in need of a limited number of light, inexpensive, durable transport vehicles that could fulfil their basic needs while the Europa Jeep was being developed and put into production.

Although Volkswagen had been approached during the 1950s about building such a vehicle, and had subsequently passed on the proposition, the then-current management of the company saw the project as having some amount of potential as a consumer vehicle; Mexican customers were asking for something that could handle rural roads better than the Type 1, which was a large seller in Mexico at the time, and the popularity of VW-based dune buggies within the U.S. made executives think that a durable, fun, off-road-capable vehicle would become attractive to many buyers. VW could keep cost to a minimum and thus maximize profitability by using existing parts.

Like the World War II era Type 82 Kübelwagen, the Type 181 used mechanical parts and a rear-engine platform, manual transmission and a flat-4 engine derived from that of the Type 1.

The floorpans came from the Type 1 Karmann Ghia, which had a wider floorpan than the Beetle. Rear swing axle suspension with reduction gearing from the discontinued split-screen Volkswagen Transporter was used until 1973, when it was replaced with double-jointed axles used by Porsche and IRS semi-trailing arm setup as used on the 1303 and US-spec Beetles.

Civilian sales began in mainland Europe and Mexico during 1971; in the U.S. in 1972; and briefly in Britain in 1975, where it failed to sell well and was dropped fairly quickly.

The model was dropped from the American lineup for 1975 as it failed to meet new, stricter US safety standards. The Type 181 was reclassified as a passenger vehicle, and thus subject to stricter safety standards. The Windshield Intrusion Rule of the 1975 DOT standard called for a greater distance between the front seat occupants and the front window glass.

The Europa Jeep was the result of a NATO plan to have a vehicle whereby each European NATO makers all combined to build a light-duty patrol vehicle.

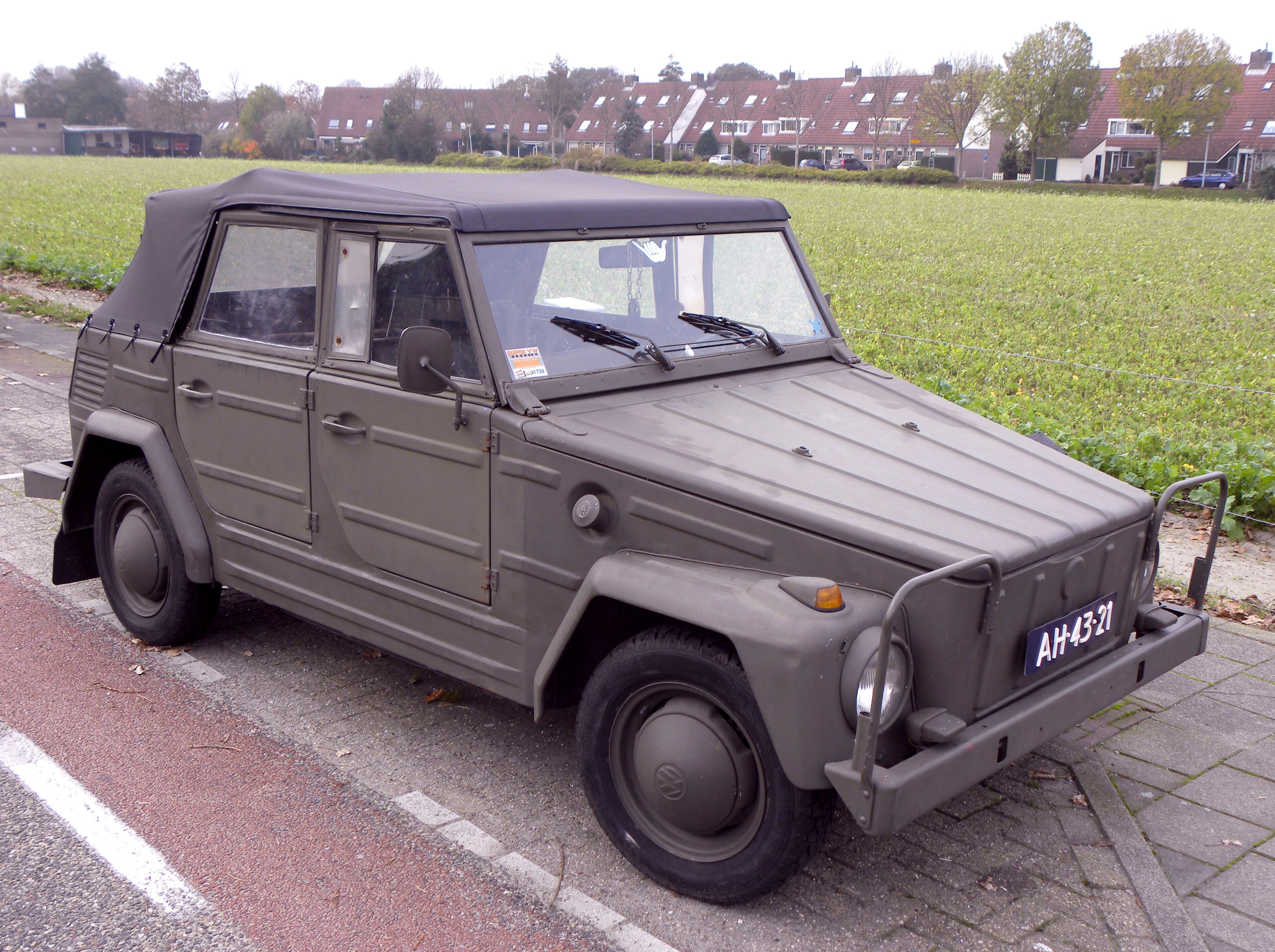
Military-use Volkswagen 181

The Volkswagen 181 was only supposed to substitute until the Europa Jeep was ready. From 1968 until 1979, over 50,000 Type 181s were delivered to the NATO forces. By 1979 the Europa Jeep project was abandoned, and the West German government began supplementing its 181s with the new front-engined Type 183 Iltis.

Despite the West German government's switch to the Type 183, European and Mexican sales of the civilian 181 continued through 1980, and several organizations, including NATO, continued to purchase military-spec Type 181 units through 1983, finding their reliability and low purchase and maintenance costs attractive.

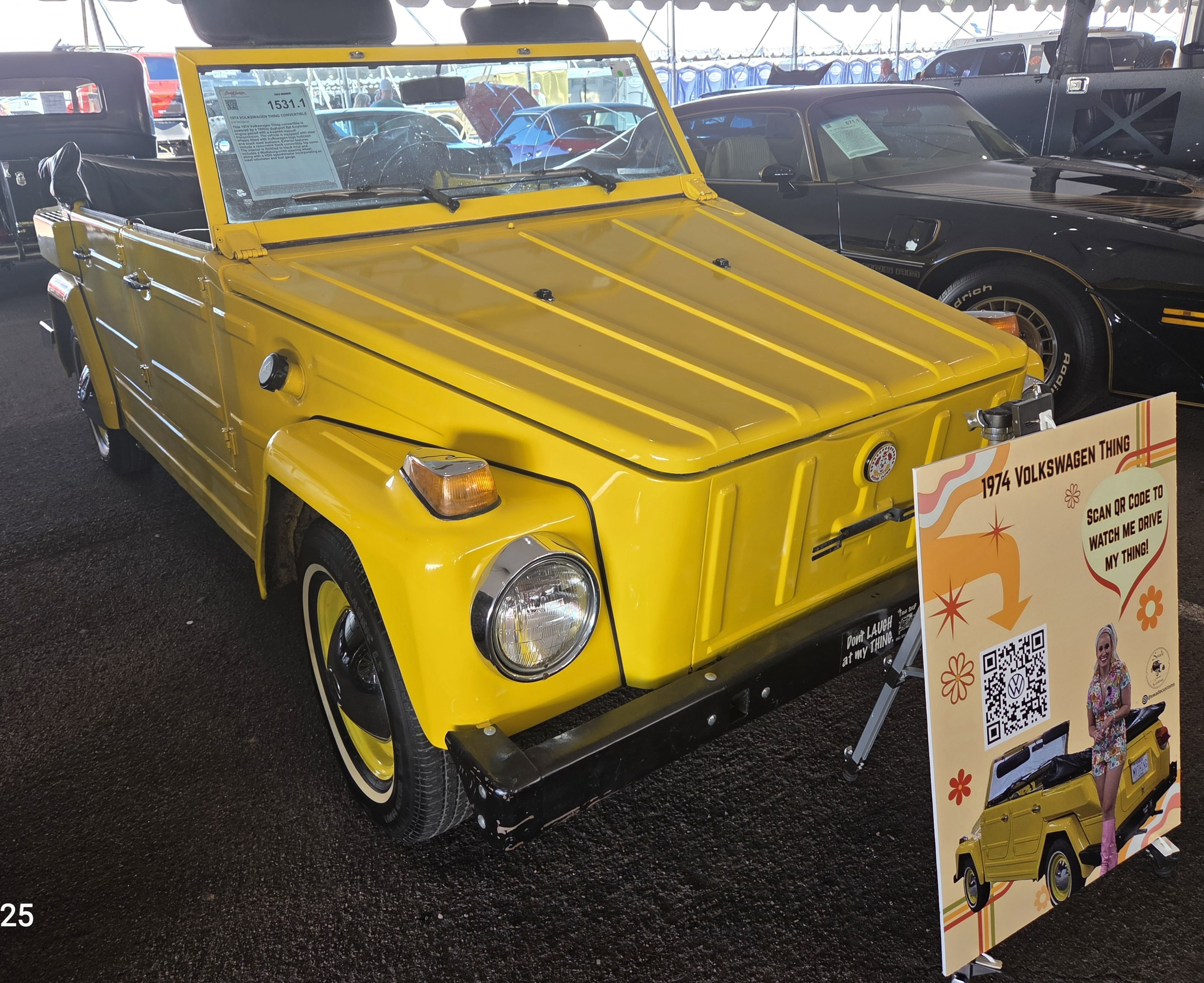
1974 Volkswagen Thing

== Technology and performance ==
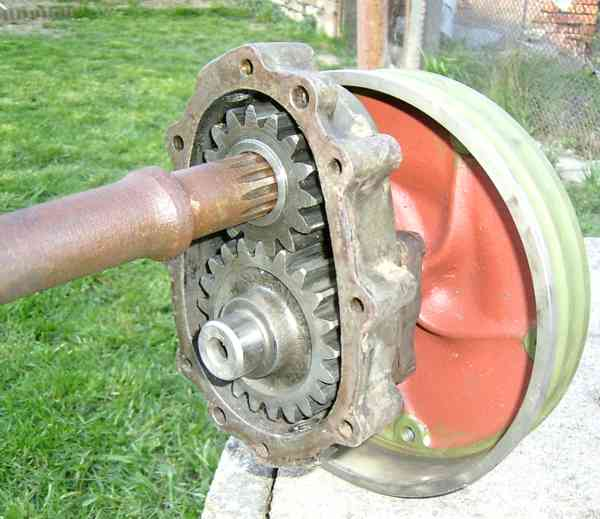
Type 181's rear axle, featuring the VW portal axle design

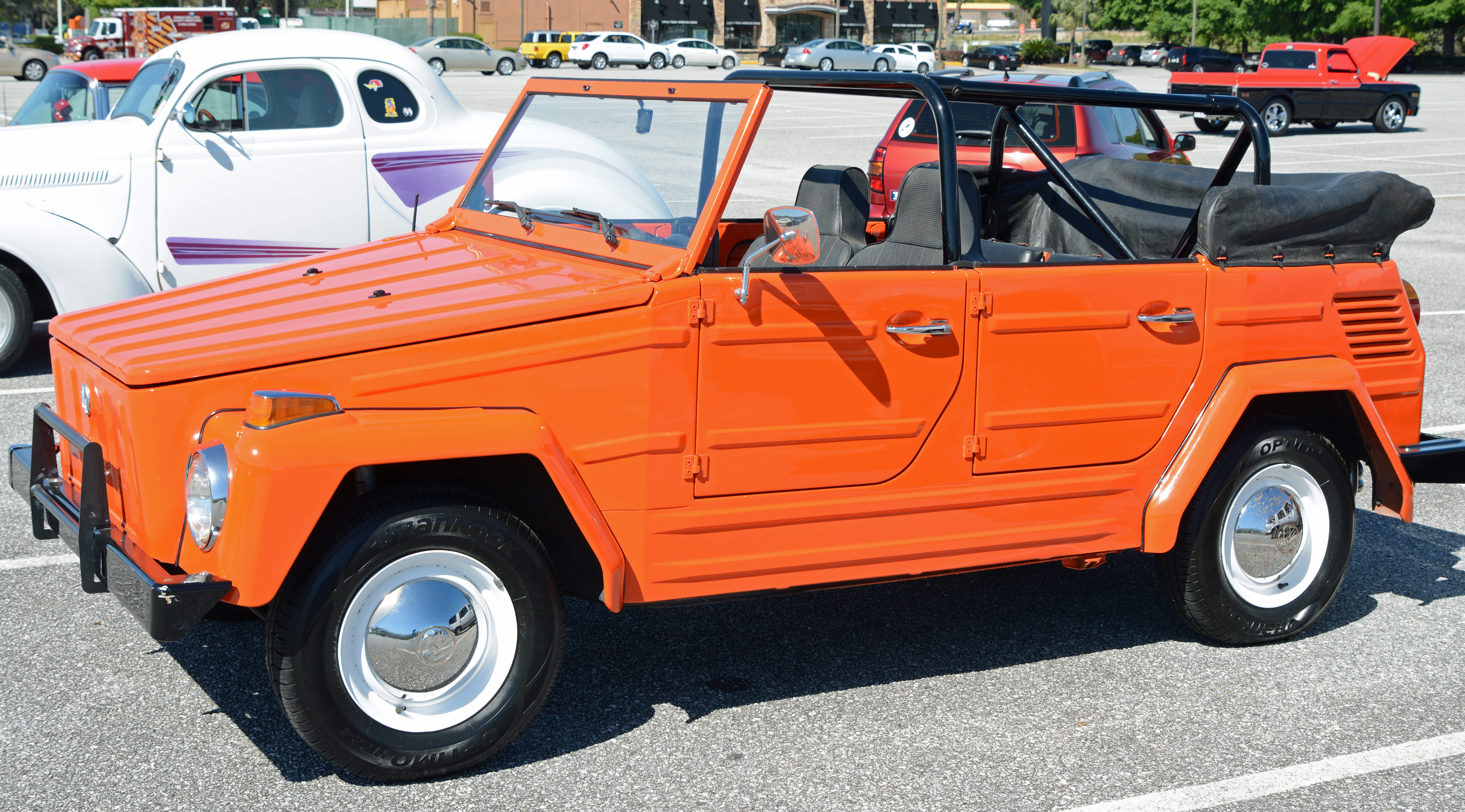
In orange

Military 181s attain a higher ride height and lower effective gearing by using reduction boxes, a form of portal axles. 181s without reduction boxes feature a transmission similar to the Beetle but with a slower gearing by use of different ring and pinion gears and have stronger, more flexible CV axles. Most mechanical parts are interchangeable with those of other VW models. Optional dual oil bath air cleaners increased filtering ability in dusty environments, and low noise ignition systems were fitted to military cars to be used for radio communication.

The engine is a 4-cylinder rear mounted petrol engine, shared with most other Volkswagens of the era.

== Military users ==
=== Former users ===
- Denmark
- Turkey
- West Germany

== See also ==
- Citroën Méhari
- BMC Mini Moke
- Volkswagen Iltis
- Fiat Ghia Jolly
- Volkswagen Country Buggy
- Renault Rodeo
- Meyers Manx
