= List of equipment of the Tunisian Army =

This is a list of equipment used by the Tunisian Army.

== Current equipment ==
=== Infantry equipment ===
Name	Image	Type	Origin	Notes
Future Assault Shell Technology helmet		Combat Helmet	United States	Used by special forces and the National Guard.
Lightweight Helmet		Combat Helmet	United States	Standard-issue army helmet with digital camouflage.
AN/PEQ-15		Laser Aiming Module (LAM)	United States	Used by special forces.

=== Small arms ===
Name	Image	Caliber	Type	Origin	Notes
Pistols
Glock 17		9×19mm Parabellum	Semi-automatic pistol	Belgium / United States	Used by special forces.
Browning HP-35		9×19mm Parabellum	Semi-automatic pistol	Belgium / United States	Standard-issue service pistol.
HS2000		9×19mm Parabellum	Semi-automatic pistol	Croatia	Future standard-issue service pistol.
Beretta M1951		9×19mm Parabellum	Semi-automatic pistol	Italy	Limited use or possibly no longer in service.
Submachine guns
Heckler & Koch MP5		9×19mm Parabellum	Submachine gun	West Germany	Used by special forces.
Beretta M12		9×19mm Parabellum	Submachine gun	Italy	In use by both police and the National Guard.
Shotguns
Franchi SPAS-15		12 gauge	Shotgun	Italy	
Assault Rifles, Battle Rifles
M4 Carbine		5.56×45mm NATO	Assault rifle, Carbine	United States	Standard-issue rifle.
Steyr AUG		5.56×45mm NATO	Assault rifle	Austria	Former standard-issue rifle, being replaced by M4 Carbine.
M16 rifle		5.56×45mm NATO	Assault rifle	United States	A rifle in limited service, primarily used by special forces.
SG 553		5.56×45mm NATO	Assault rifle	Switzerland	Used by Presidential Guard (GIP).
AKM		7.62×39mm	Assault rifle	Soviet Union	Used by infantry units operating in Saharan territories.
FN FAL		7.62×51mm NATO	Battle rifle	Belgium	No longer in service with the army, now in limited use with the National Guard.
Machine guns
M249		5.56×45mm NATO	Light machine gun, Squad automatic weapon	Belgium / United States	Used by infantry and special forces.
FN Minimi		5.56×45mm NATO	Light machine gun, Squad automatic weapon	Belgium / United States	Used as a squad automatic weapon by infantry.
FN MAG		7.62×51mm NATO	General-purpose machine gun	Belgium	Used by infantry as general-purpose machine gun and by Tunisian Air Force mounted on helicopters.
M60		7.62×51mm NATO	General-purpose machine gun	United States	Standard general-purpose machine gun. Variants include M60E6.
MG 3		7.62×51mm NATO	General-purpose machine gun	West Germany	
M2 Browning		12.7×99mm NATO	Heavy machine gun	United States	Heavy support machine gun used on tripod or mounted on vehicles.
M1919 Browning		7.62×63mm NATO	Medium machine gun	United States	Limited use.
Sniper rifles
KAC 110		7.62×51mm NATO	semi-automatic sniper rifle	United States	Used by special forces and several army units.
Hk417		7.62×51mm NATO	semi-automatic sniper rifle	Germany	Used by the Army Special Forces Brigade (SFB).
Steyr SSG 69		7.62×51mm NATO	Sniper rifle	Austria	Standard-issue sniper rifle.
Barrett M82		12.7×99mm NATO	Anti materiel sniper rifle	United States	Used by special forces.
Grenade launchers
M203		40mm	Grenade launcher	United States	A grenade launcher mounted on the Steyr AUG and M4 platforms.
Mk 19		40mm	Automatic grenade launcher	United States	Heavy support grenade launcher mounted on vehicles.

=== Artillery ===
Name	Image	Type	Number	Origin	Notes
Towed artillery
M198		155mm towed howitzer	57	United States	Main artillery piece equipping 3 artillery battalions each attached to a mechanized infantry brigade. Heavily deployed during Chaambi Operations; Delivered in 1989.
M101A1 howitzer		105mm towed howitzer	10-48	United States	Several units were seen in use during African Lion 2024.
Mortars
M30		107mm heavy mortar	144	United States	78 towed + 36 mounted in mortar carriers M106A2 as self-propelled heavy mortars.
M29		81mm medium mortar	96	United States	
Hirtenberger M6C-210		Light Mortar	300	Austria	

=== Anti-tank weapons ===
Name	Image	Type	Caliber	Origin	Notes
Anti-tank guided missile
BGM-71 TOW		Anti-tank missile	152mm with warhead	United States	Mounted on HMMWV with some assumed to equip M901 ITV thus no evidence to confirm it. Number of launchers is unknown, but considering the army organization should be around 36. 454 missiles delivered in 1982 and 180 missiles delivered in 2006.
MILAN		Anti-tank missile	115mm with warhead	France; West Germany / Germany	Number of launchers is unknown. 100 missiles delivered in 1981 and 40 missiles delivered in 1997.
Recoilless guns
M40 recoilless rifle		Recoilless rifle	105mm	United States	70 in service, also mounted on HMMWV.
Carl Gustaf 8.4cm recoilless rifle		Recoilless rifle	84mm rifled	Sweden	M3 version but the number of pieces are unknown. Seen in some pictures within Tunisian soldiers.
Shoulder launched anti-tank rocket
FGM-148 Javelin		Man-portable anti-tank system	127mm	United States	In November 2024 the US government approved the sale of the FGM-148 to Tunisia for $107.7 million, the deal includes 184 missiles and 30 Lightweight Command Launch Units (LWCLUs).
RPG 32		Rocket-propelled grenade launcher	72/105mm	Jordan / Russia	Several units were seen with army and National Guard units, number is unknown.
LRAC F1		Rocket-propelled grenade launcher	89mm	France	Unknown number of launchers, could be around 600.
RPG 7		Rocket-propelled grenade launcher	40mm	Russia	Unknown number. Seen in use during African Lion 2024

=== Anti-aircraft weapons ===
Name	Image	Type	Number	Origin	Notes
Surface-to-air missiles and early-warning radars
M-48 Chaparral		Surface-to-air missile	46	United States	26 M-48 launchers and 354 MIM72C missiles delivered in 1979; 311 MIM72F Charparral missiles delivered in 1983; 20 M-48 launchers, 300 MIM72C and 300 MIM72F Charparral missiles delivered in 2002 (second hand; aid) Unknown serviceability. changed the launchers into direct-fire artillery
RBS-70 Bofors		Surface-to-air missile	60	Sweden	Delivered on since 1981, including 300 missiles in various batch.
Anti-aircraft guns
Zastava M55		3x20mm anti-aircraft guns	100	Yugoslavia	Mostly employed as direct-fire artillery.

=== Tanks ===
Name	Image	Type	Number	Origin	Notes
Main battle tanks
M60A1/A3		Main battle tank	90	United States	54 M60A3 delivered in 1984 (A contract valued at $92 million) and 30 M60A1 probably second hand Equipping two tank battalions, each attached to a mechanized infantry brigade.
Light tanks
SK-105 Kürassier		Light tank	55	Austria	Delivered in 1979 equipped with FL-12 105mm tank turret of French AMX-13; Equipping 1 tank battalion attached to one infantry mechanized brigade.

=== Reconnaissance ===
Name	Image	Type	Number	Origin	Notes
Armored scout cars
Panhard AML60/90		Armored Scout Car	40	France	18 armored car delivered in 1970 and 10 second hand delivered in 1999. Variants includes AML-90 equipped with a 90mm gun and AML-60 equipped with a 60mm mortar.
EE-9 Cascavel		Armored Scout Car	36	Brazil	
Cadillac Gage Commando 4×4		Armoured personnel carrier	15	United States	

=== Armored vehicles ===
Name	Image	Type	Number	Origin	Notes
Armoured personnel carriers
M113		Armoured personnel carrier	300	United States	M113A1: 30 delivered in 1974 + 60 delivered in 1981. M-577A1 CP: 20 delivered in 1981 + 6 delivered in 2003. Equipping 3 mechanized infantry battalions each attached to a mechanized infantry brigade.
Fiat-Otobreda 6614		Armoured personnel carrier	120	Italy	Delivered in 1980; Equipping 3 mechanized infantry battalions each attached to a mechanized infantry brigade.
EE-11 Urutu		Armoured personnel carrier	36	Brazil	
Sherpa Light		Armoured personnel carrier	N/A	France	Multiple units have been delivered in for testing including the APC and scout variants
MRAP
BMC Kirpi		MRAP	270	Turkey	Delivered in 2016. Aimed to improve soldier protection against improvised explosive device attacks and ambushes following deadly terrorist attacks against the army. Equipped with remote weapon station and forward-looking infrared radar Equipping newly established Intervention battalions.
Ejder Yalcin		MRAP	170	Turkey	Delivered in 2017. Equipping Saharian territory infantry units.
BMC Vuran		MRAP	50	Turkey	
Dingo 2		MRAP	100	Germany	Units were seen in use with Saharan territory forces, numbers are unknown.
ACMAT Bastion		MRAP	8	France	Delivered in 2016, financed by the United States DoD. Equipping armored engineer, mine clearance unit.
Infantry mobility vehicles
HMMWV Up-Armored		Infantry mobility vehicle	648	United States	Delivered in 2016. M1165A1 version. Equipped with M2 Browning .50 BMG machine guns. in June 2025 Tunisia has received 70 up-armored units.
Ground Mobility Vehicle		Infantry mobility vehicle	Large quantities	United States	Number of units are with the army used as fast attack and patrol vehicles, Equipped with light machine guns.
M997 ambulance		Military ambulance	N/A	United States	Used for medical evacuation.
Iveco LMV		Infantry mobility vehicle	150	Italy	Used by national guard special units as well.
Otokar Cobra II		Infantry mobility vehicle	100	Turkey	
Technamm Masstech T4		Infantry mobility vehicle	100	France	
CSK-131		Infantry mobility vehicle	100	China	Several units were seen in the streets of the capital for evaluation purpose, no purchase confirmed.
LPV Jeep J8		Infantry mobility vehicle	70	United States; Egypt	Delivered in 2016. Equipped with M2 Browning .50 BMG machine guns or Mk 19 grenade launchers.
NIMR		Infantry mobility vehicle	40	United Arab Emirates	Delivered in 2012, probably as aid.
Toyota Land Cruiser		Infantry mobility vehicle	N/A	Japan	Equipped with M2 Broning .50 BMG machine guns, employed by Saharian territory infantry units, Used for rapid intervention and desert patrol.
CFMOTO CFORCE1000		All terrain vehicle	N/A	China	Used by Sahran desert forces and national guard
Armoured recovery vehicles
M88A1 Recovery Vehicle		Armoured recovery vehicle	6	United States	Delivered in 1984, as part of M60A3 Patton deal.
HET M1000		Armored recovery vehicle	N/A	United States	

=== Unmanned Aerial Vehicles ===
Name	Image	Type	Number	Origin	Notes
Unmanned aerial vehicles
RQ-20 Pumas		Unmanned aerial vehicle	N/A	United States	Multiple units were seen with Army and Navy units for Recon purpose.
Phantom (unmanned aerial vehicle series)		Unmanned aerial vehicle	N/A	China	Used for tactical recon.
Quadcopter		Unmanned aerial vehicle	N/A	Multiple Countries	Multiple variants are locally developed.

=== Logistics Vehicles ===
Name	Image	Type	Number	Origin	Notes
Logistics Vehicles
Iveco		Medium truck	500	Italy	Operating in 6x6 and 4x4 variants.
FMTV		Tactical truck	N/A	United States	Seen in use in multiple areas.
Navistar 7000 series		Medium truck	N/A	United States	Used for artillery transport and infantry.
Mercedes-Benz Unimog U-4000		Light truck	N/A	Germany	
Mercedes-Benz Unimog U-5000		Light truck	N/A	Germany	
M35A2		Medium truck	N/A	United States	
M151A2 MUTT		Military light utility vehicle	N/A	United States	Military Museum of Bardo
Land Rover Defender		Off road vehicle	N/A	United Kingdom	
M939		Heavy truck	N/A	United States	
M49		Tanker truck	56	United States	

=== Radars ===
Name	Image	Type	Number	Origin	Notes
Radars
RASIT Ground Surveillance Radar		Ground Surveillance Radar	2	France	
AN/TPQ-53		Quick Reaction Capability Radar	2	United States	Two units might be on order.
Giraffe 40		Radar	4 - 12	Sweden	
Indra Radar		3D Long range radar	N/A	Spain	Seen in multiple videos released by the Ministry of Defense.

== Classified Special Forces Equipment (Unlisted) ==
- Pindad SS2-V5 A1: Procured in limited batches from Indonesia for elite tactical units. Features a sealed long-stroke gas piston system designed to aggressively cycle and clear fine sand without a physical stoppage.
- Vz. 58: Captured border stock utilized by specialized Saharian Units. Features a milled ordnance-steel receiver and a unique open-top cycling action that naturally ejects desert dust during high-rates of fire.
- Sarsilmaz SAR 223T: Turkish short-stroke gas piston carbine issued to the BAT. Utilizes a dry-rail system that prevents sand particles from adhering to internal bolt carrier components.

=== Artillery ===
- 30 Mle 1950 BF-50 155 mm towed howitzer (France), delivered in 1960
- 30 M114A1 155 mm towed howitzer (United States), ex-US, delivered in 1965
- 48 M108 105 mm self-propelled howitzer (United States), ex-US, delivered in 1968

=== Anti-tank equipment ===
- 80 SS.11 ATGM launcher (France)
- 300 M20 "Super Bazooka" 3.7 inch/94mm Light ATRL (United States)
- 140 M18 57mm recoilless rifle (United States)

=== Anti-aircraft equipment ===
- 16 M42 Duster twin-mounted Bofors 40 mm self-propelled AAG (United States/Sweden) 8 delivered in 1968 and 8 delivered in 1972, all second hand; aid

=== Tanks ===
- 30 AMX-13/75 75 mm main gun light tank (France), 15 delivered in 1960 and 15 delivered in 1970
- 12 M41 Walker Bulldog 76 mm main gun light tank (United States), delivered in 1960, second hand
- 14 M48A5 Patton 90 mm main gun main battle tank (United States), delivered in 1973, second hand

=== Armoured vehicles ===
- 15 EBR-75 armoured car (France), delivered in 1957
- 10 M8 Greyhound armoured car (United States), delivered in 1960

=== Reconnaissance ===
- 20 Alvis Saladin 76 mm main gun 6×6 ARV (United Kingdom)
