= DKW Munga =

DKW-branded off-road vehicle

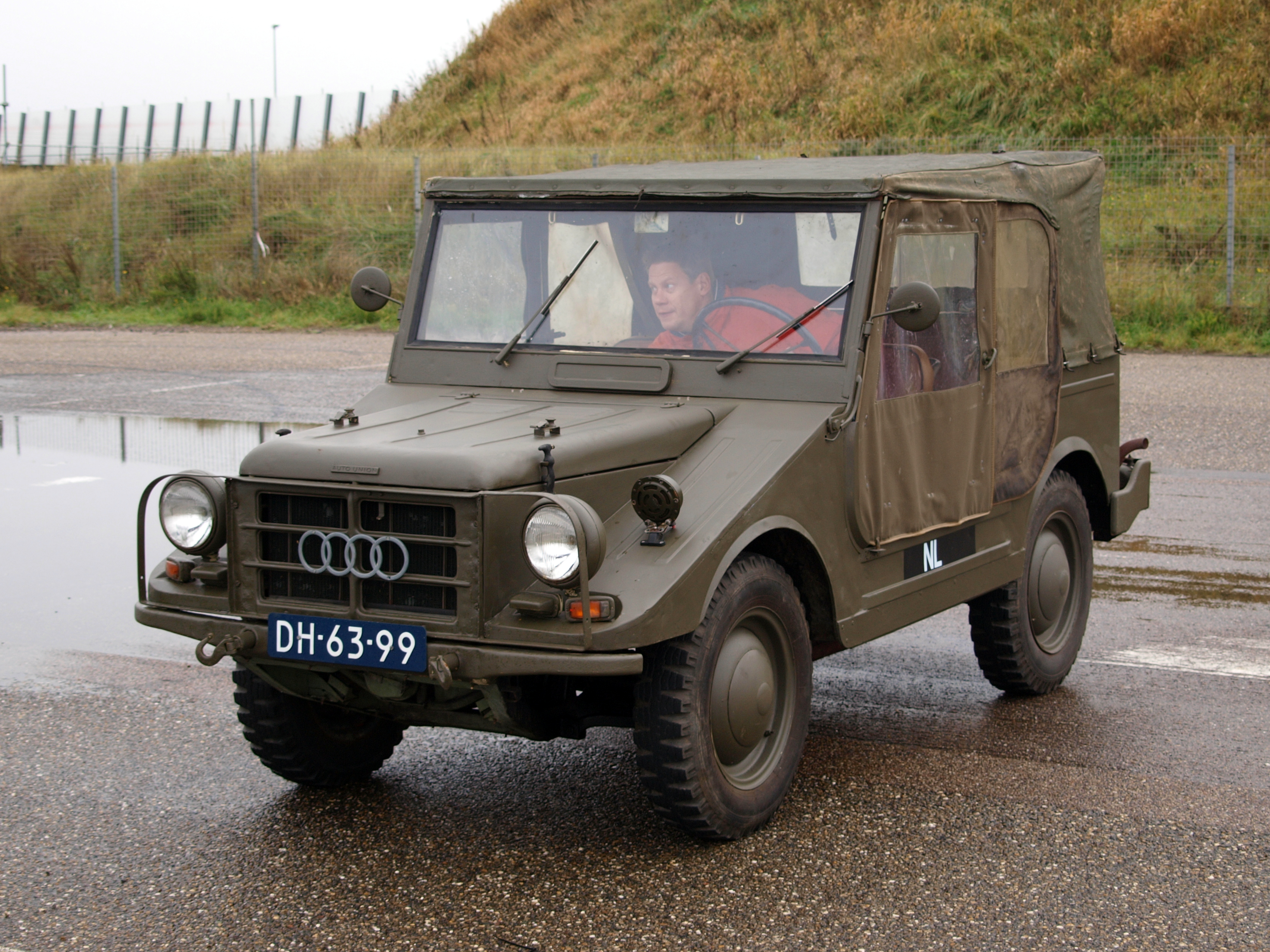

Overview
- Manufacturer: Auto Union
- Also called: DKW-Vemag Candango (Brazil)
- Production: October 1956 – December 1968
- Assembly: West Germany: Ingolstadt; Brazil: São Paulo (Vemag)

Body and chassis
- Class: Off-road vehicle
- Body style: Cabriolet; Pickup
- Layout: FF layout

Powertrain
- Engine: 896 cc two-stroke I3; 981 cc two-stroke I3
- Transmission: 8-speed manual

Dimensions
- Wheelbase: 2,000 mm (78.7 in)
- Length: 3,445–3,595 mm (135.6–141.5 in)
- Width: 1,705–1,830 mm (67.1–72.0 in)
- Height: 1,704–1,937 mm (67.1–76.3 in)
- Curb weight: 1,060–1,885 kg (2,337–4,156 lb)

The DKW Munga is a DKW-branded 4WD off-road vehicle that was built by Auto-Union in Ingolstadt, West Germany from 1956 to 1968. When German authorities inquired in 1953 about vehicles for border police and the possible future Army that was founded on 12 November 1955, DKW developed the car based on the two-stroke engine DKW 3=6 car and DKW Schnellaster van, and won the tender over so-called Jagdwagen (hunter's cars) like Goliath Typ 31 and Porsche 597.

The name Munga abbreviates the German description Mehrzweck Universal Geländewagen mit Allradantrieb, which translates as "multi-purpose universal off-road car with all-wheel drive" In addition, the name is similar to Mungo, German for Mongoose, and predates the Volkswagen Iltis Typ 183 named after the European polecat.

== Development ==
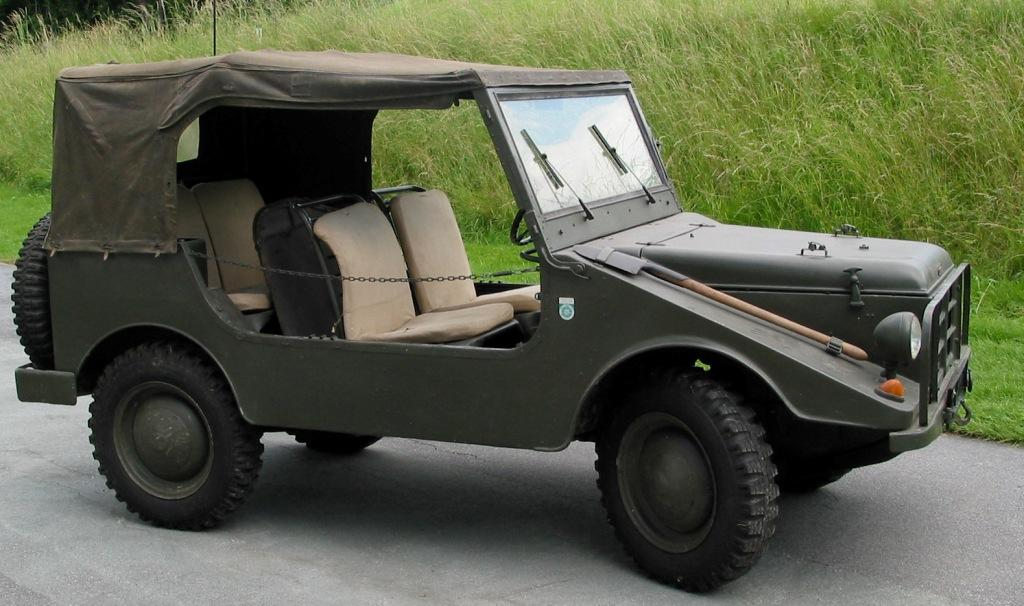
1955 pre-production prototype.

Production began in October 1956 and ended in December 1968. During this time 46,750 cars were built. The 38th International Motor Show at Frankfurt in the autumn 1957 was a great success for Auto-Union. About this time the Munga was launched. The vehicle, which has extraordinary stamina, was not only adopted by the West German Bundeswehr as a vehicle unique in its class but was also bought in large numbers for the German Border Police and various foreign military formations within NATO.

The civilian version of the Munga was widely adopted in West Germany for agricultural and forestry work in particular, and also became popular abroad, especially in those countries where "go anywhere" transport was needed because of poor roads, such as large parts of South America and South Africa. Around 2000 cars were delivered to the Royal Netherlands Army, many of which were shipped to the UK in the late 1970s.

The Munga was later also available from the end of 1956 as a four-seat pan structure of steel sheet and as a six-or eight-seater platform body. The term therefore corresponds to the body variant:

- Four seat (Munga 4)
- Pick-up (Munga 6)
- Long Pick-up (Munga 8)

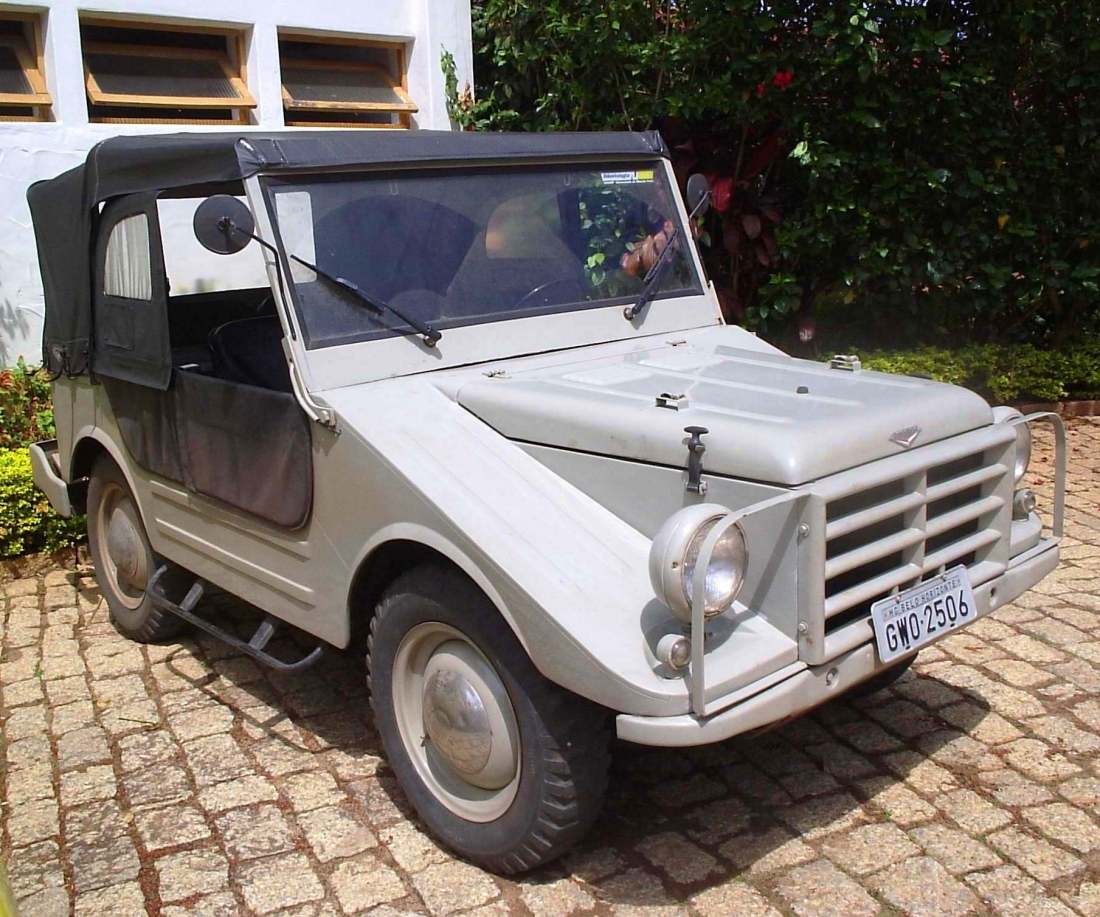
Candango, the Brazilian Munga

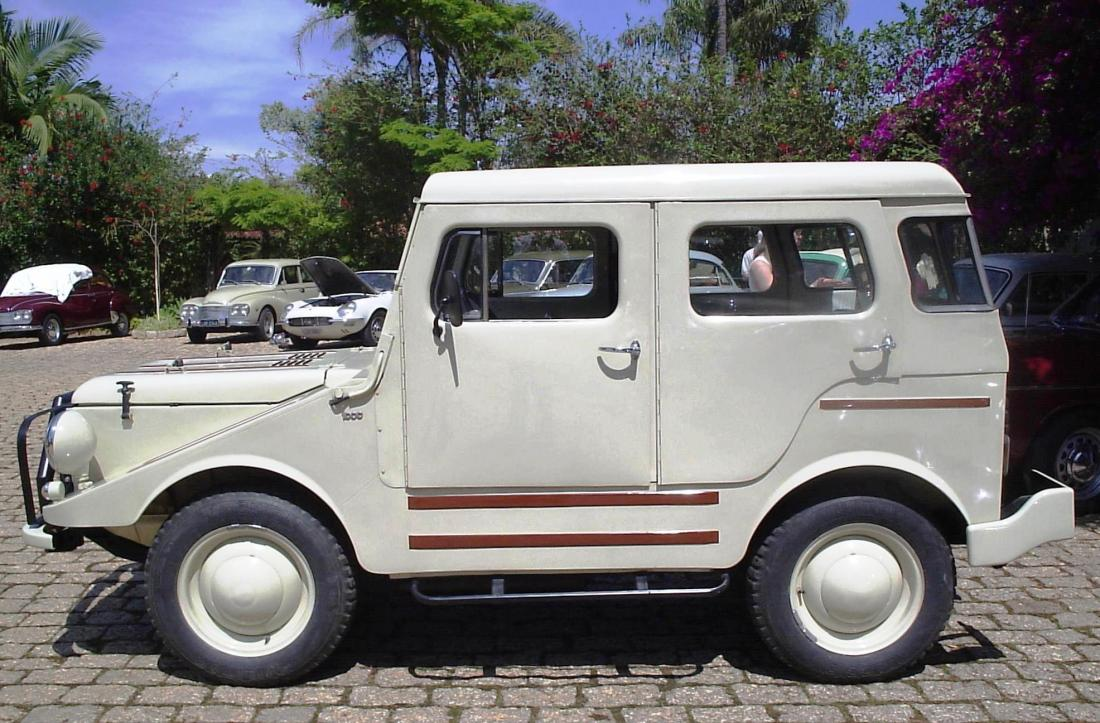
A 1960 Candango, with hard top made by Carraço

The Royal Netherlands Army had intended the Munga as a replacement for the 1956 M38A1 NEKAF Jeep, but the type caused so many problems that it was removed from front line service prematurely in 1970. The M38A1 NEKAF Jeeps, that had been stored in mobilization compounds for reserve units, were re-issued to operational units - where they remained in use until 1995.

The Munga was also built in São Paulo, Brazil, by DKW-Vemag, where it was called DKW Candango. The local production lasted from 1958 to 1963 in four-wheel drive and two-wheel drive versions.

== Operators ==
=== Former operators ===
- Netherlands: Used by the Royal Netherlands Army.
- West Germany

== See also ==
- Europa Jeep
- Fabrique Nationale AS 24
- FMC XR311
- M151 ¼-ton 4×4 utility truck
- Porsche 597
