= Porsche 597 =

1950s German military vehicle

Porsche 597 Jagdwagen
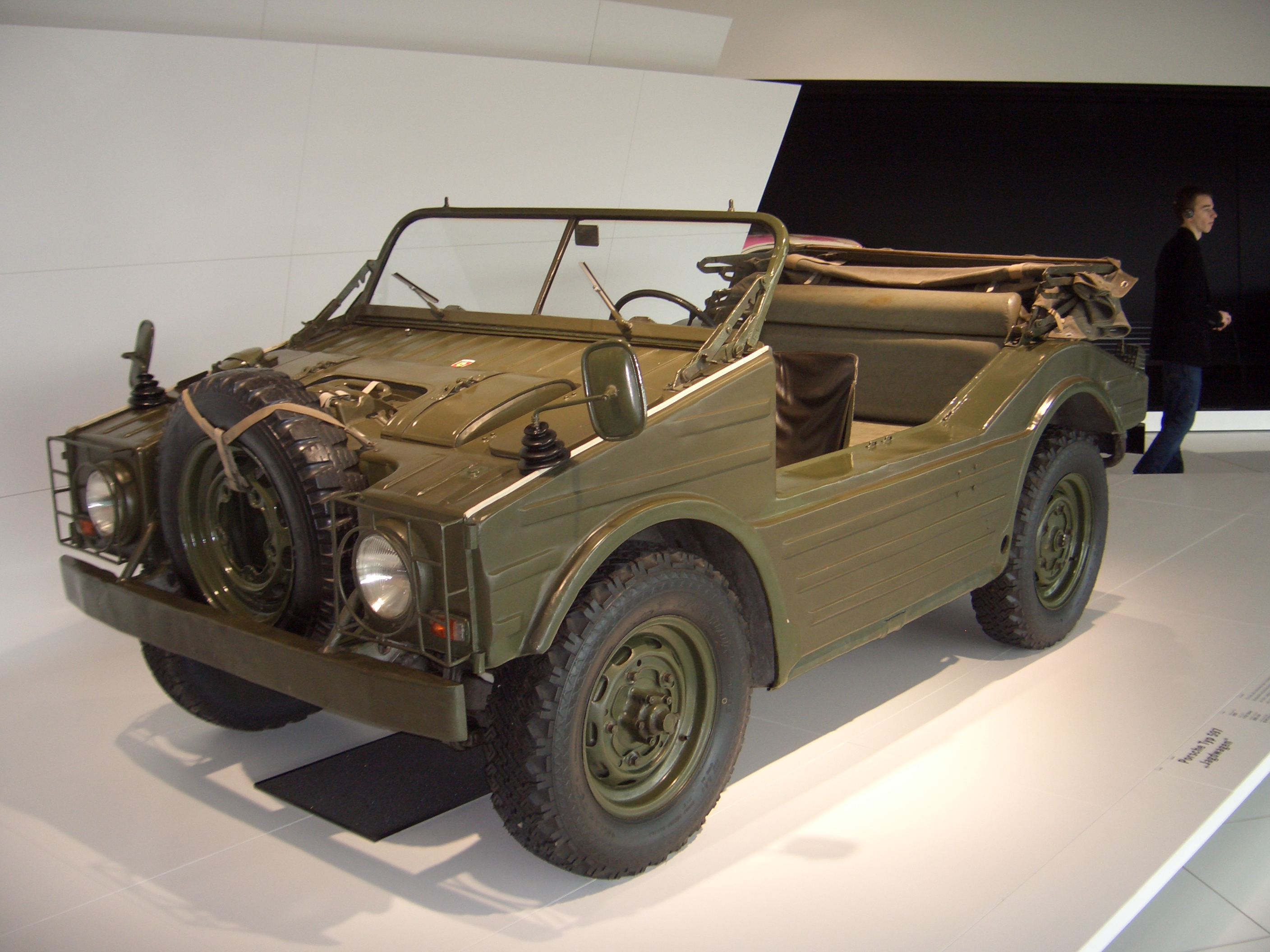

Overview
- Manufacturer: Porsche
- Production: Prototype: 1953; Production: 1955–1958

Body and chassis
- Class: Off-road vehicle
- Body style: Cabriolet
- Layout: Rear engine

Powertrain
- Engine: Air-cooled 1.5 L boxer Air-cooled 1.6 L boxer from 1955

Dimensions
- Length: 3.7 m (145.7 in)
- Curb weight: 990 kg (2,183 lb)-1,090 kg (2,403 lb)

The Porsche 597 Jagdwagen (hunting car) is a light 4WD military vehicle, designed in the 1950s to fill the same general military role as the VW Kübelwagen, the US Jeep and British Land-Rover.

Originally developed as a prototype for a 1953 tender to the West German police and a future West German Army, the car never reached mass production after the DKW Munga was chosen over it for reasons of economics.

The 597 was propelled by an induced air-cooled flat-four taken from the Porsche 356, located in the rear of the vehicle like the VWs and Porsches of the period; first in an amended version of the 1.5 litre, with a later bump to 1.6 in the l-model. This engine had an output of around 37 kW (50 HP). Together with a vehicle weight of 990 kilograms a maximum speed of around 100 kilometers per hour could be achieved. For transmission, a 5-speed manual box with additional on-the-fly two/four wheel drive shifter was provided. With its short wheelbase of 2,060 mm, the vehicle had the ability to climb steep grades of up to 65%.

The prototype body of the car was manufactured by Porsche's own Stuttgart Body Works with later versions (stabilized with torsion bars) coming from Karmann. The monocoque shell came with no doors and high sills, meaning passengers needed to climb over them to enter and exit the vehicle; The upside of this design being that the body was buoyant and amphibious. Later versions of the body came with rigid doors and exhibit a more steeply dropping angle to the front wings/fenders and bonnet–hood.

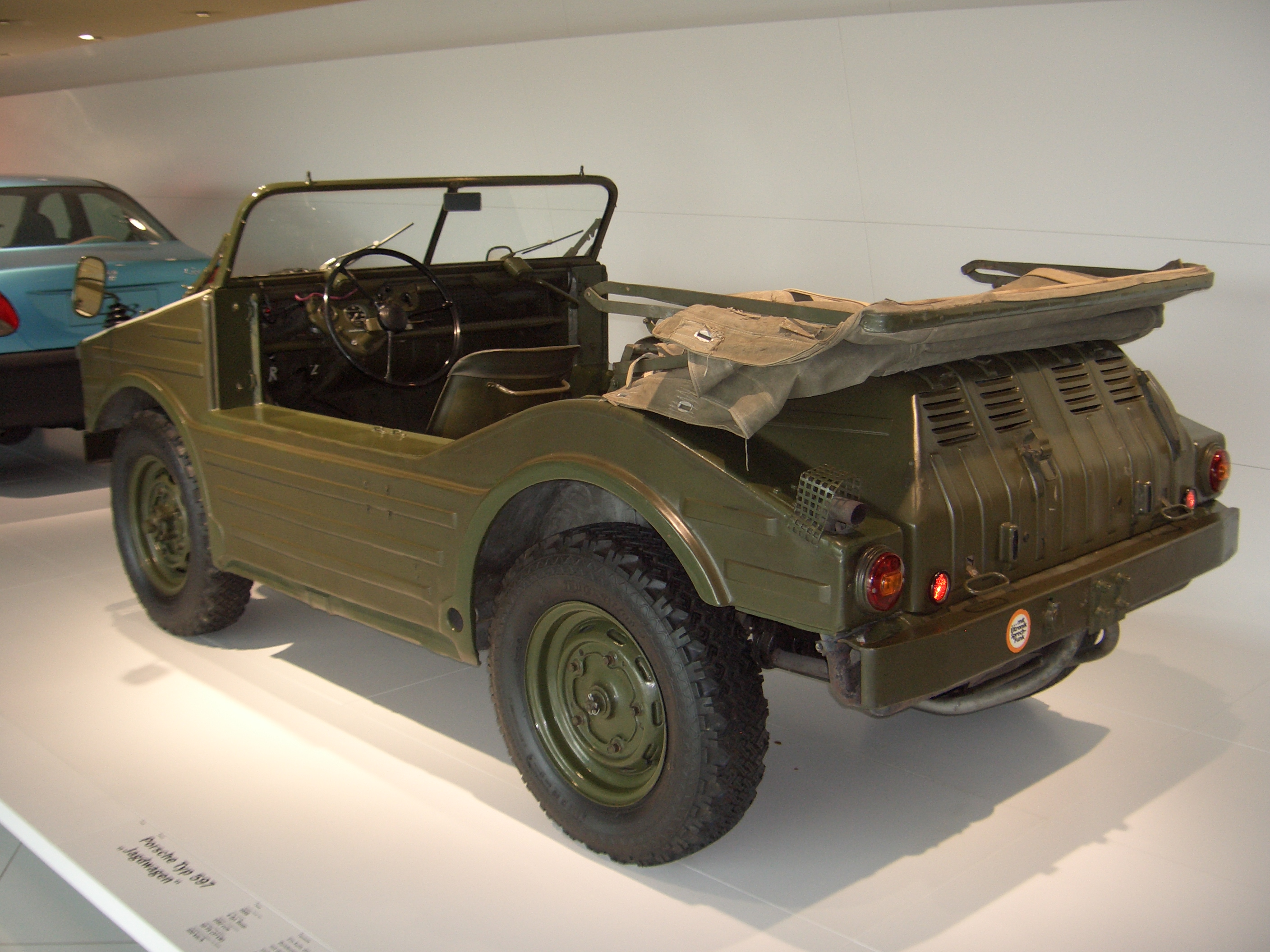
1953 Porsche 597 prototype military vehicle (same as above); rear

The Porsche 597 'Hunting Car', alongside the Goliath Type 31 'Hunting Car' (by the German Federal Armed Forces) were never commissioned for mass production, since, (in the case of the 597), the production costs were too high and the company could not easily supply the sheer numbers of units needed in proposed timescale. Instead the Auto-Union-built two-stroke DKW Munga model won out for its relative simplicity, lower cost and Auto Union's ability to meet the Army's demand.

A total of 71 Porsche 597s were manufactured, between 1955 and 1958, 49 of which were built for the civilian market (chassis numbers starting from 597 to 000101). Development costs for the vehicle amounted to approximately 1.8 million DM. In August 1959, there were still hopes within the Porsche company to produce an updated vehicle based on the 597 platform with a strengthened chassis, extended wheelbase of 2,400mm that could be made available in five different body-styles. However, the project was eventually cancelled, and the new vehicle never saw the light of day.

== See also ==
- Volkswagen 181
- FMC XR311
- Fabrique Nationale AS 24
- M151 jeep
