= Technamm Masstech T4 =

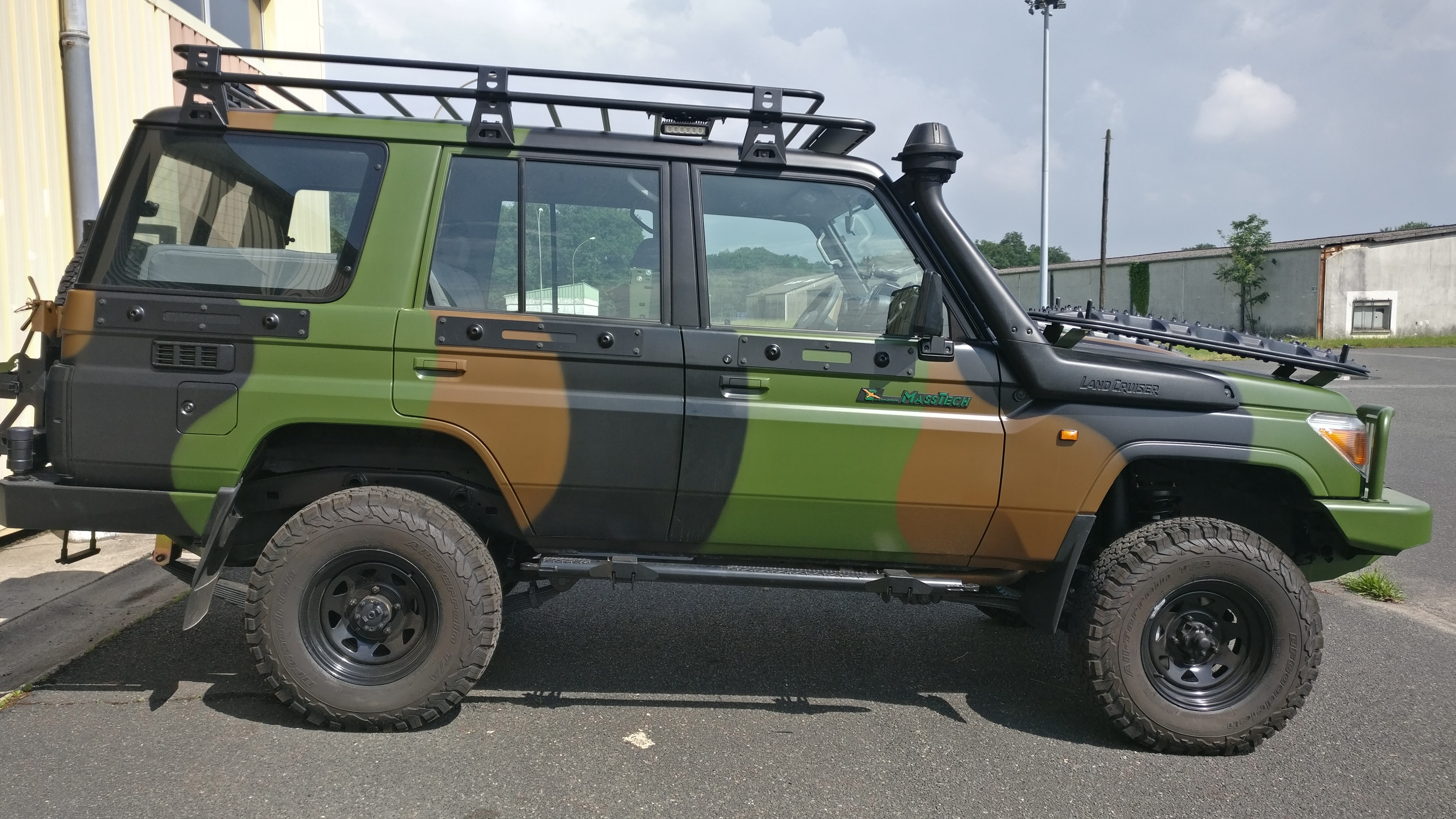
- French Army T4 with the 121st Train Regiment.
- Type: Unarmored SUV, Military light utility vehicle
- Place of origin: France

Production history
- Manufacturer: Technamm
- Produced: 2017-
- No. built: +1000

Specifications
- Armour: None
- Suspension: 4x4

The Technamm Masstech T4 is an unarmoured off-road vehicle used by the French Armed Forces. It is based on the Toyota Land Cruiser HZJ76 and manufactured by the Technamm company.

== History ==
The Masstech T4 was designed in 2016 based on a call for tenders from the French Army, under the VLTP NP (Véhicule Léger Tactiques Polyvalents Non Protégés or Lightweight Multipurpose Tactical Vehicles Not Protected)

Faced with replacing the Peugeot P4 and while waiting for the ACMAT VT4, the French army ordered 500 units, with the first one delivered in April 2017 and the last in November 2018.

In December 2022, a new contract for 128 units for the G5 Sahel Joint Force was announced.

== Specifications ==
The base of the Masstech T4 is built by Toyota in Japan, from the HZJ76 model. Technamm then carries out the militarization in Aix-en-Provence. In particular, the vehicle is equipped with a PR4G radio, a SITEL terminal and a DAGR GPS. It can carry four or five passengers. Deployed only in France with Opération Sentinelle, its engine, rustic and compatible with African and military fuels, allows its shipment to OPEX.

Its unit cost is 70,000 euros, 60% of which goes to Masstech.

== Users ==
- France: Used by French Army.
- Tunisia: In mid-November 2022, France donate 100 T4s to Tunisia through the Directorate of Security and Defence Cooperation.
