= Peugeot P4 =

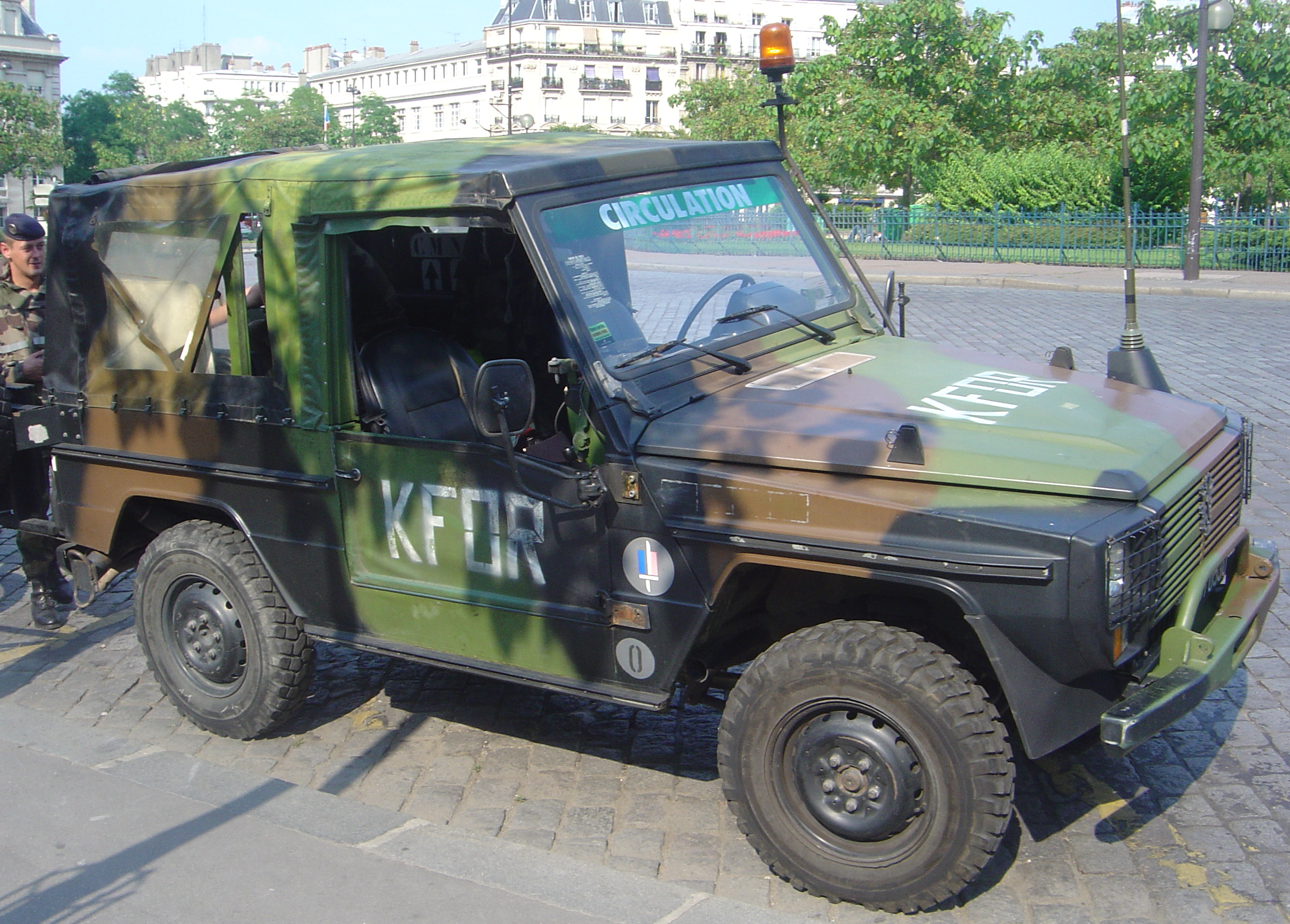
- French Army P4 in Paris, 2005
- Type: Unarmored SUV, Military light utility vehicle
- Place of origin: France

Service history
- Used by: See Users

Production history
- Variants: See Variants

Specifications
- Mass: 1,750 kg (3,858 lb)
- Length: 4,200 mm (165.4 in); 4,650 mm (183.1 in) (long version)
- Width: 1,700 mm (66.9 in)
- Armour: None
- Main armament: Browning M2 HMG (For VPS version); Gatling Gun; MILAN
- Secondary armament: 7.62mm machine gun
- Engine: 2.0 L XN8 I4; 2.5 L XD3 diesel I4; 79 PS (58.1 kW; 77.9 hp); 70.5 PS (51.9 kW; 69.5 hp)
- Suspension: 4x4
- Operational range: with 75 litres (+ 20 litres en jerrican) of petrol a road range of 800 km
- Maximum speed: 108 km/h (67 mph)–118 km/h (73 mph)

The P4 is an unarmoured off-road vehicle used by the military of France. It was manufactured by Peugeot but is now manufactured by Panhard. It is to be replaced with the PVP by Panhard. The P4 is a derivative of the Mercedes Geländewagen military version built under license by Peugeot for the French military. Peugeot did not have a licence to export the vehicle anywhere else than to the countries bound to France by defence agreements.

== History ==
In the late 1960s, the French army decided that its 10,001 Jeeps needed to be replaced. The replacement vehicle would carry four men with radio equipment and would be small enough to be parachuted and transported by plane.

After many technical issues, the new vehicle was designed in the 1970s. Agreement was reached between Peugeot and Mercedes to co-produce the vehicle on a 50:50 basis. Peugeot installed the engine of the Peugeot 504 and the transmission of the Peugeot 604 on the Mercedes-Benz G-Class; it also installed the electrical systems, welded the exterior and painted the car. The rest was done by Mercedes. The plant in Sochaux did the final assembly. The first prototype was tested in 1978, beginning a long series of tests and trials, notably a rally in south Algeria with a petrol and a diesel P4.

The French Army ordered 15,000 P4s, both petrol and diesel versions; in 1981, the order was reduced to 13,500 units with the downsizing of the Army. From 1985, production was transferred to Panhard in Marolles-en-Hurepoix, where 6,000 vehicles were produced. In 2016, P4s were donated to the Cameroonian military for its special forces units.

A civilian version was made, but encountered little success because of the high price and a poor power-to-weight ratio.

In 2016, the French military ordered 500 Technamm Masstech T4 VLTP VP vehicles as an interim replacement to the P4.

== Variants ==
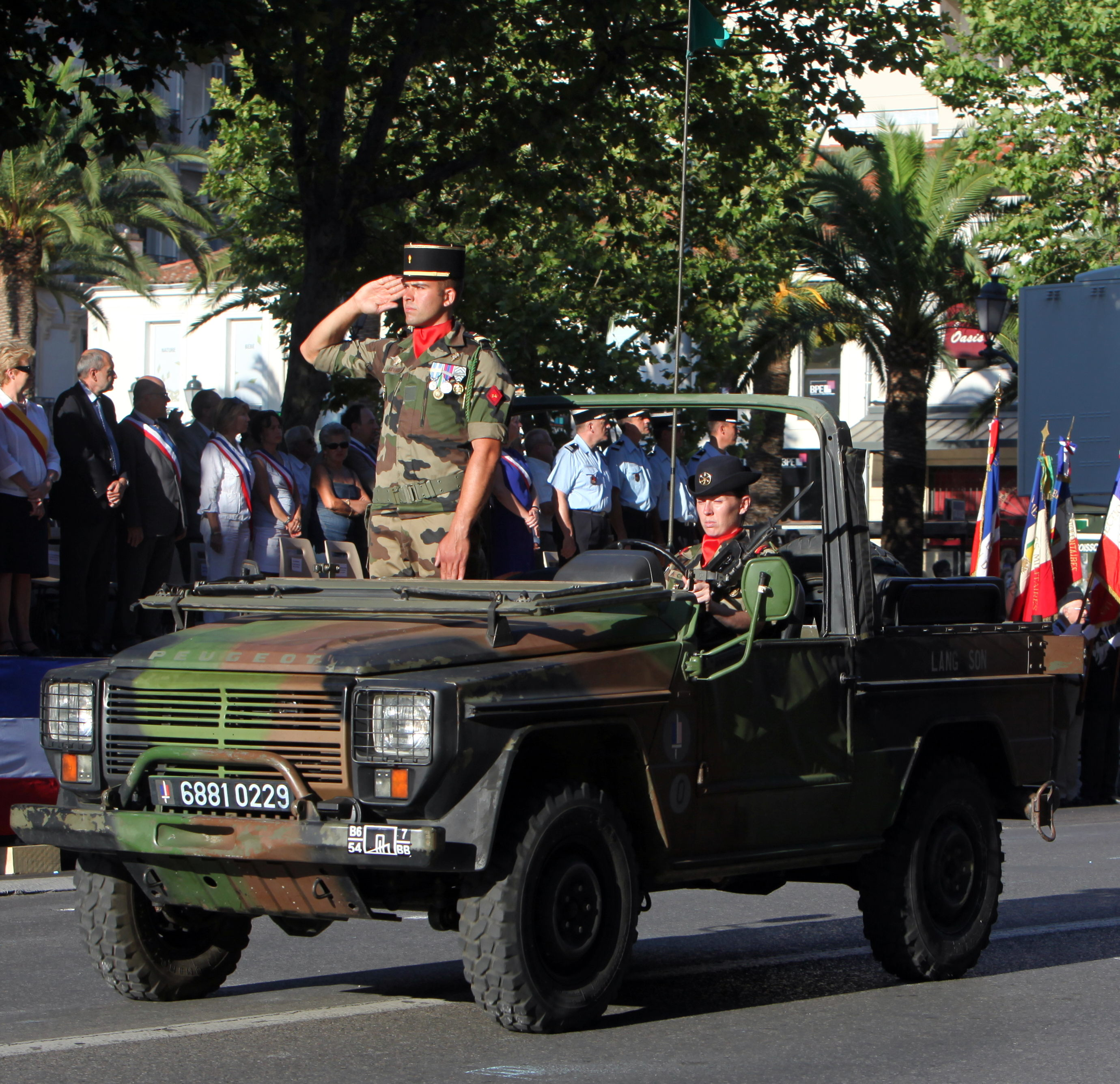
P4 of the 54th Artillery regiment, 2011 military parade.

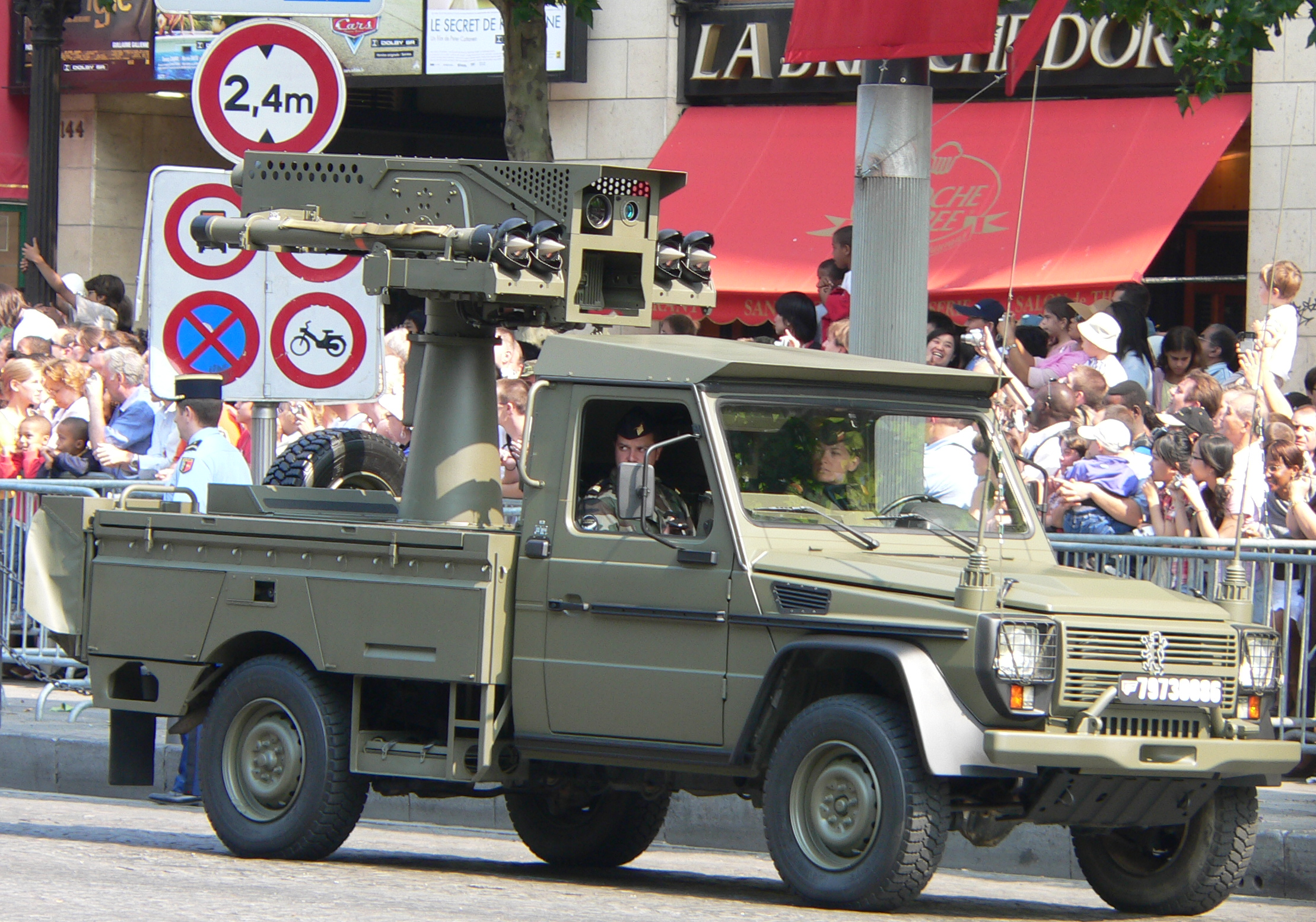
P4 with Mistral missiles in Aspic mount. 2006 military parade, Paris.

=== P4D ===
In 1992, the Army converted around 1,300 petrol P4s into diesel P4D (P4 Diesel) models. The conversion was executed by Panhard (1300 VLTT) and the Établissements régionaux du matériel. The engine, a 2.5-liter Peugeot four-cylinder, is the same as used in the original diesel P4.

=== P4P ===
The P4 P (P4 Protégé, "protected P4") is an armoured version, with 80 units built in the 1990s. An armored version was made at the request of Peugeot by CBH Institutions (Constructions Blindées of Hardricourt).

This version has been evaluated by the French Army and commissioned by the Navy for the Protection of sensitive sites. Five different versions were produced.

- P4 CBH AKIS 2400
- P4 CBH SUPER AKIS 2850
- P4 CBH 3120

The four digits at the end of the name signify the three wheelbases of 2,400, 2,850, or 3,120 mm (94.5, 112.2, or 122.8 in) that were available. Some P4 armored CBH have been manufactured for use in Lebanon.

An operation Manufacturer and the GIGN was conducted in November 1988 for testing rolling over 24 hours. The P4 Shielded CBH AKIS blue police carried out the range of 1000 km to the average of 134.5 km per hour and the total distance of 3180 km in 24 hours is an average of 132.5 km / hour with 4 men on board. The engine was a 2.5-litre turbo exchanger amended by CBH, which had an output of 150 hp.

=== P4 VPS ===
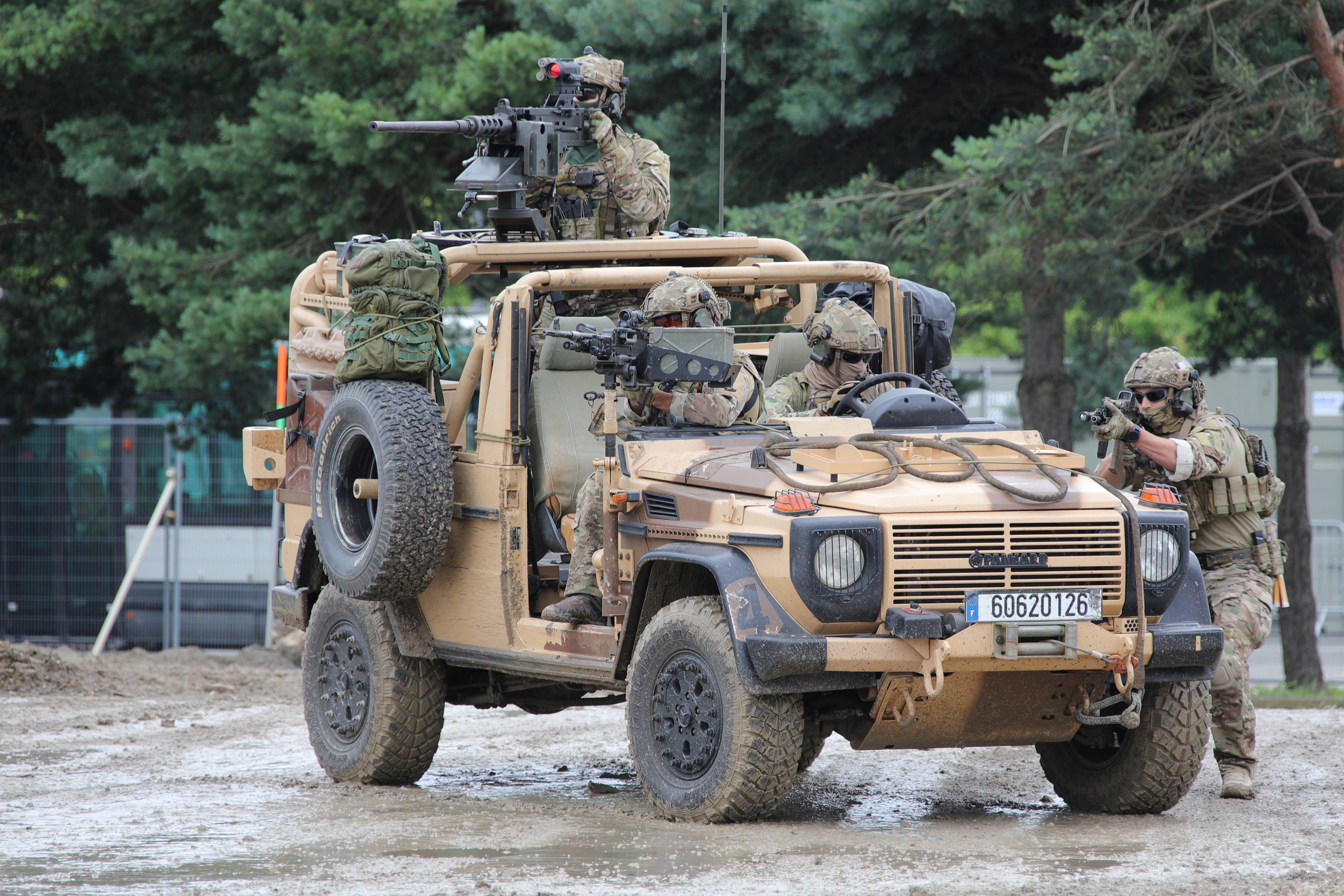
A Panhard VPS in service with French special forces.

Version of the P4 for French special forces. Contract was awarded to Panhard by the DGA in 2005. 51 VPSes were brought to service.

They're equipped with armored floors to provide landmine protection.

The VPS can be transported by either a C-160 Transall or C-130 Hercules.

=== P4 VIPAIR ===
The P4 VIPAIR (Véhicule d'Intervention et de Projection Air – Air Intervention and Projection Vehicle) was created by Arquus in 2016, which converted 19 P4 ASPICs.

The programme was completed on October 15, 2020.

== Users ==
- Cameroon
- Chile
- Ukraine: 120

=== Former Users ===
- France: Used by the French military. Replaced by the Technamm Masstech T4 VLTP NP after 2016.

== See also ==
- Mercedes-Benz G-Class
