= Fabrique Nationale AS 24 =

Belgian military motorized tricycle

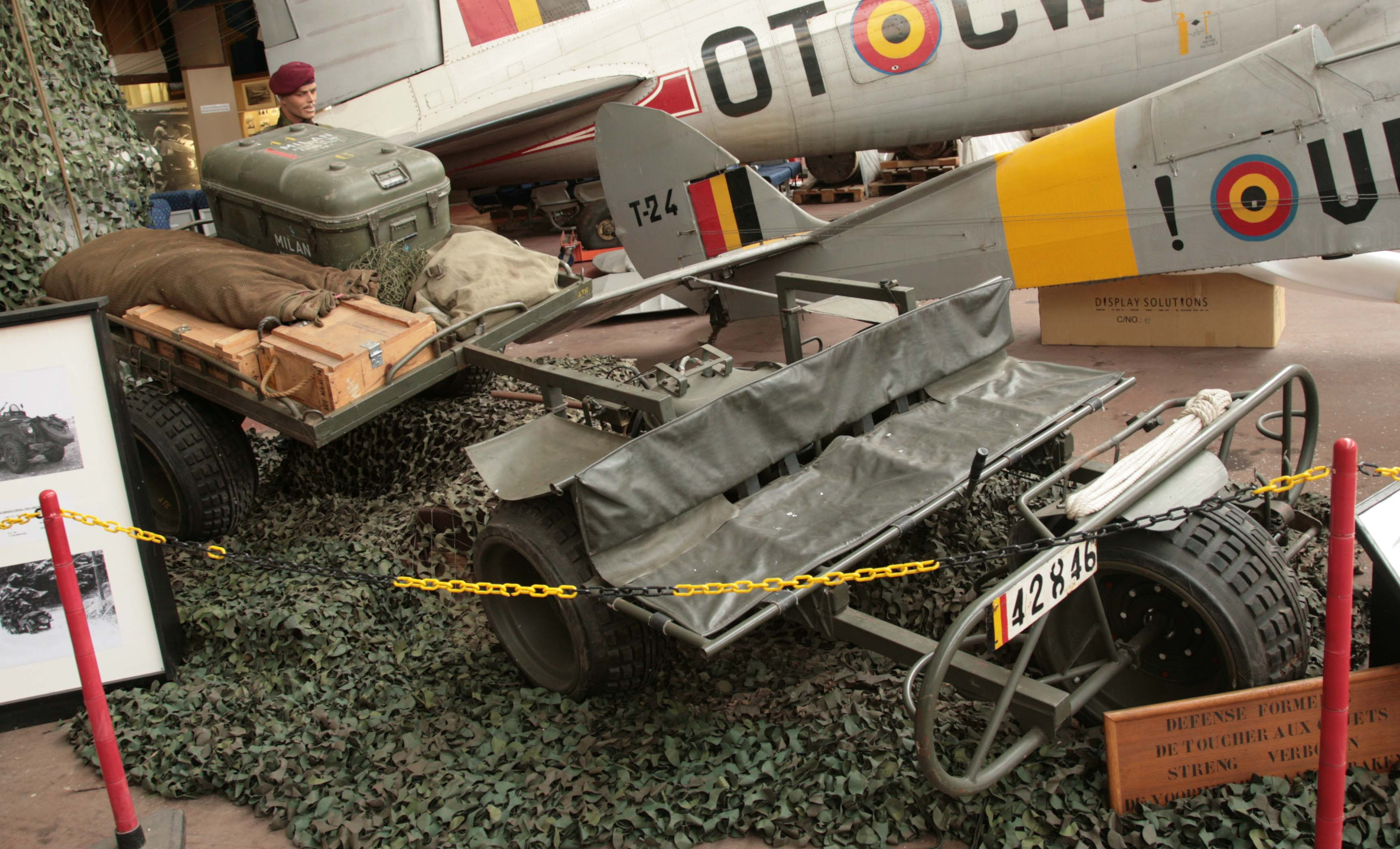
AS-24 Trike with cargo trailer

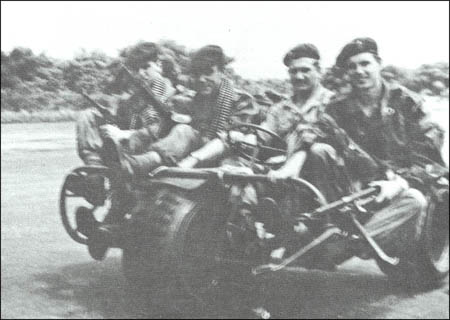
An AS 24 in action with Belgian paratroopers in Operation Dragon Rouge, 1964

The AS 24, also known as Véhicule Aeroporte or Tricar Parachutable, was a military motorized tricycle produced by Fabrique Nationale de Herstal during the 1960s. A single vehicle was evaluated by the US Army in 1963. 460 were produced, with the majority being used by Belgian parachute troops, notably during Operation Dragon Rouge.

130 returned to service in the French paratrooper units. They were withdrawn from service in 1984, replaced by Lohr Fardier.

== Specifications ==
- Passengers: 4 including Driver
- Weight: 374 lb (170 kg)
- Cargo: 770 lb (350 kg) of men and equipment.
- Height: 2 ft 10 in (85 cm)
- Engine: 15 hp (11 kW) Two-cylinder, two-stroke, 15 cubic inch (0.245 litres, 245cc) model FN 24
- Speed: 60 mph (97 km/h)
