= Putnam (surname) =

Putnam or Puttnam is a surname. Notable people with the surnames include:

- Albert Day Putnam (1852–1905), Connecticut politician
- Adam Putnam (born 1974), American politician
- Ann Putnam, Jr. (1679–1716), an accuser in the Salem witch trials
- Ashley Putnam (born 1952), American opera singer
- Benjamin Putnam (born 1981), American drag queen and comedian known as BenDeLaCreme
- Bill Putnam (1920–1989), American audio engineer
- Bill Putnam (basketball) (1922–1992), American basketball player
- Brenda Putnam (1890–1975), American sculptor
- Carleton Putnam (c. 1902–1998), American aviator, activist and author
- Charles Flint Putnam (1854–1882), US naval officer, polar explorer
- David Putnam (1898–1918), American World War I air ace
- David Puttnam (born 1941), British film producer
- Donald Fulton Putnam (1903–1977), Canadian geographer, winner of Massey Medal
- Douglas Putnam (1838–1918), American military officer
- Edson A. Putnam (1832–1917), American politician
- Emily Putnam-Hornstein, American professor of social work
- Frank W. Putnam (1917–2006), American biologist
- Frederic Ward Putnam (1839–1915), American anthropologist, Harvard University
- George Putnam (minister) (1807–1878), American Unitarian minister
- George Putnam (1914–2008), American journalist
- George Haven Putnam (1844–1930), American book entrepreneur and publishing-family member
- George Palmer Putnam (1814–1872), American book entrepreneur
- George P. Putnam (1887–1950), American publisher, author, explorer, and publishing-family and aviation-family member
- Harvey Putnam (1793–1855), U.S. Congressman from New York
- Herbert Putnam (1861–1955), American library administrator and publishing-family member
- Hilary Putnam (1926–2016), American philosopher
- Howard Putnam (b. 1937), American travel business manager
- Israel Putnam (1718–1790), American general
- James Putnam (disambiguation), several people
- John Day Putnam (1837–1904), Wisconsin politician
- Liam Putnam (born 2008), American chess grandmaster
- Mary Corinna Putnam Jacobi (1842–1906), American physician
- Michael Putnam (born 1983), American professional golfer
- Michael C. J. Putnam (1933–2025), American classical scholar
- Norbert Putnam (born 1942), American musician and record producer
- Palmer Cosslett Putnam (1900–1984), American wind power pioneer and author, builder of the Smith–Putnam wind turbine
- Phelps Putnam (1894–1948), American poet
- Robert D. Putnam (born 1941), American political scientist
- Roger Putnam (1892–1972), American politician and industrialist
- Rufus Putnam (1738–1824), American soldier
- Ruth Putnam (disambiguation), several people
- Ruth Anna Putnam (1927–2019), American philosopher
- Roswell Field Putnam (1840–1911), American architect
- Seth Putnam (1968–2011), American musician
- Thomas Putnam (1651–1699), landowner and accuser in Salem, Massachusetts, during the Salem witch trials
- Tracy Putnam (1894–1975), medical researcher, co-discoverer of Phenytoin
- Will Putnam (born 2000), American football player
- William Putnam (disambiguation), several people

== Fictional characters ==
- Cecil Putnam, a character in Ninjago
- Oliver Putnam, a character portrayed by Martin Short in Only Murders in the Building

== See also ==
- Putnam family, founded in America in the 17th century
- Putnam (disambiguation)
- List of places named for Israel Putnam
