= History of wind power =

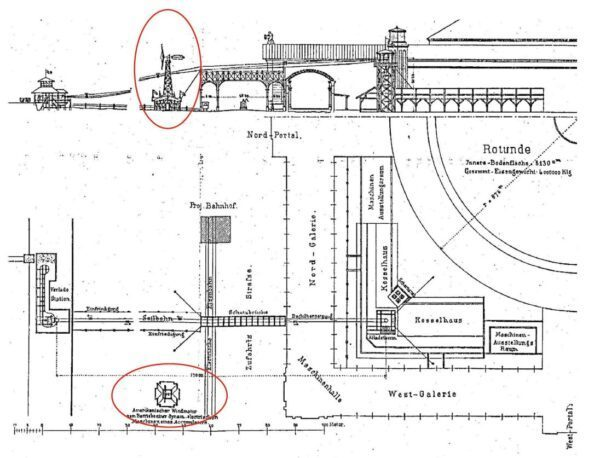
Plan of the wind turbine for power generation by Josef Friedlaender before the electrical exhibition in the Vienna Prater (Rotunde) in 1883

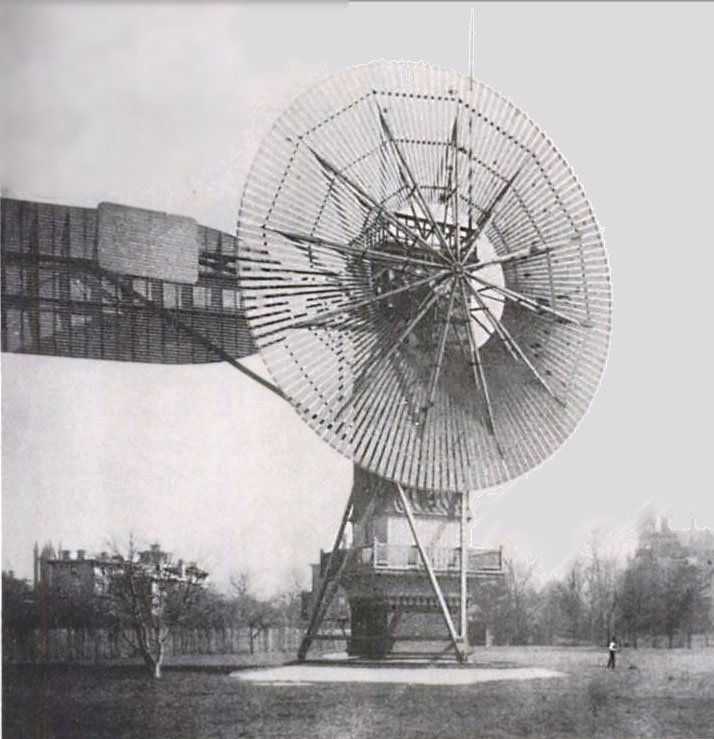
Charles Brush's windmill of 1888, used for generating electricity

Wind power has been used as long as humans have put sails into the wind. Wind-powered machines used to grind grain and pump water – the windmill and wind pump — were developed in what is now Iran, Afghanistan, and Pakistan by the 9th century. Wind power was widely available and not confined to the banks of fast-flowing streams, or later, requiring sources of fuel. Wind-powered pumps drained the polders of the Netherlands, and in arid regions such as the American midwest or the Australian outback, wind pumps provided water for livestock and steam engines.

With the development of electric power, wind power found new applications in lighting buildings remote from centrally generated power. Throughout the 20th century, parallel paths developed small wind plants suitable for farms or residences and larger utility-scale wind generators that could be connected to electricity grids for remote use of power. Wind-powered generators operate in sizes ranging between tiny plants for battery charging at isolated residences up to near-gigawatt sized offshore wind farms that provide electricity to national electrical networks.

The first electricity-generating wind turbine was installed by the Austrian Josef Friedländer at the Vienna International Electrical Exhibition in 1883, followed by wind generators, e.g., in Scotland in July 1887 by Prof James Blyth of Anderson's College, Glasgow (the precursor of Strathclyde University). Blyth's 10 metres (33 ft) high cloth-sailed wind turbine was installed in the garden of his holiday cottage at Marykirk in Kincardineshire, and was used to charge accumulators developed by the Frenchman Camille Alphonse Faure to power the lighting in the cottage, thus making it the first house in the world to have its electric power supplied by wind power. Blyth offered the surplus electric power to the people of Marykirk for lighting the main street; however, they turned down the offer, as they thought electric power was "the work of the devil." Although he later built a wind turbine to supply emergency power to the local Lunatic Asylum, Infirmary, and Dispensary of Montrose, the invention never really caught on, as the technology was not considered to be economically viable.

Across the Atlantic, in Cleveland, Ohio, a larger and heavily engineered machine was designed and constructed in the winter of 1887–1888 by Charles F. Brush. This was built by his engineering company at his home and operated from 1886 until 1900. The Brush wind turbine had a rotor 17 metres (56 ft) in diameter and was mounted on an 18 metres (59 ft) tower. Although large by today's standards, the machine was only rated at 12 kW. The connected dynamo was used either to charge a bank of batteries or to operate up to 100 incandescent light bulbs, three arc lamps, and various motors in Brush's laboratory. With the development of electric power, wind power found new applications in lighting buildings remote from centrally generated power. Throughout the 20th century, parallel paths developed small wind stations suitable for farms or residences. From 1932, many isolated properties in Australia ran their lighting and electric fans from batteries, charged by a "Freelite" wind-driven generator, producing 100 watts of electrical power from as little wind speed as 10 miles per hour (16 km/h).

The 1973 oil crisis triggered the investigation in Denmark and the United States that led to larger utility-scale wind generators that could be connected to electric power grids for remote use of power. By 2008, the U.S. installed capacity had reached 25.4 gigawatts, and by 2012, the installed capacity was 60 gigawatts. Today, wind-powered generators operate in every size range, between tiny stations for battery charging at isolated residences up to gigawatt-sized offshore wind farms that provide electric power to national electrical networks. By the early 2020s, wind produced 3% of global total primary energy and generated 7% of electricity.

== Antiquity ==
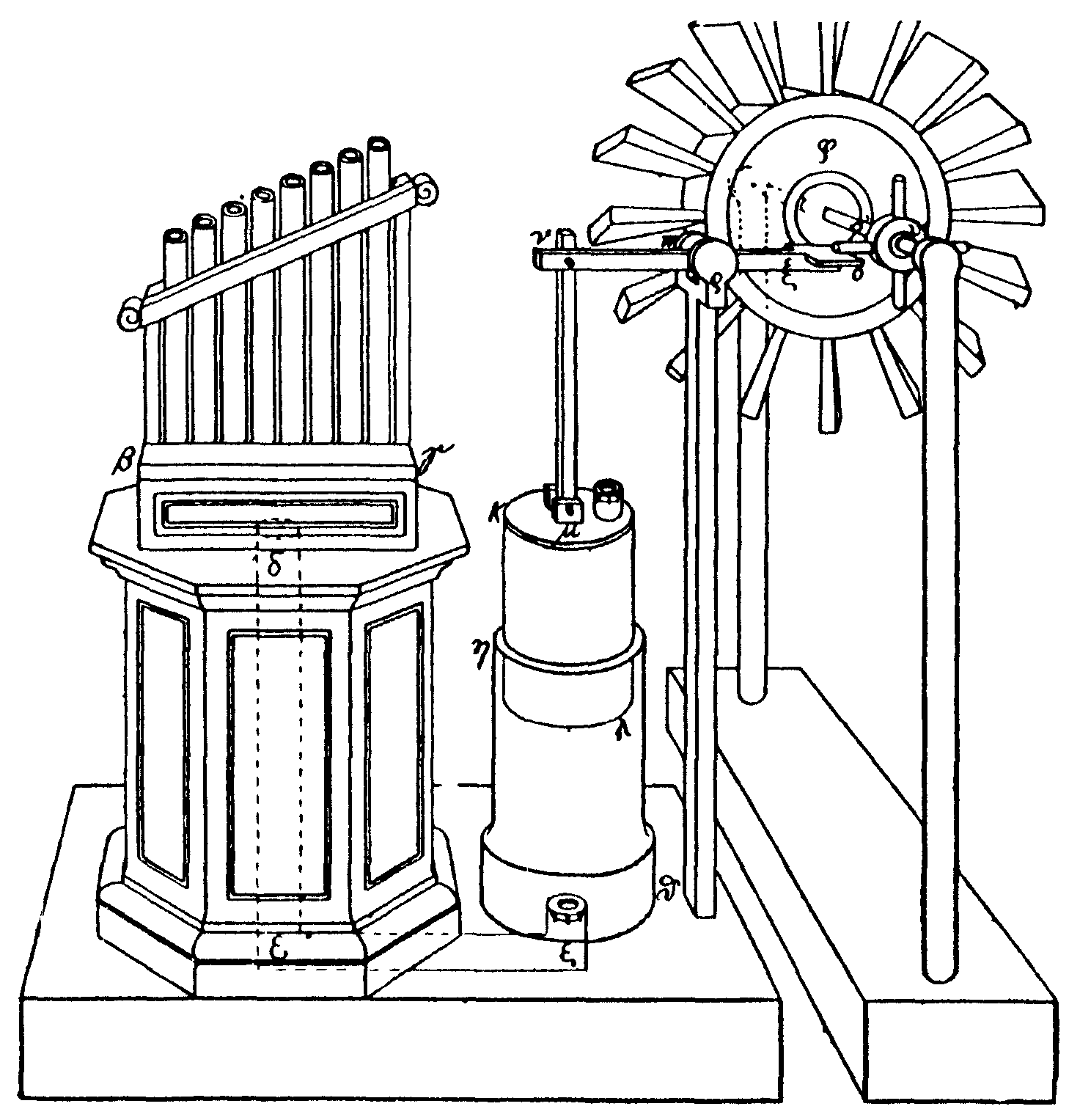
Heron's wind-powered organ, the earliest machine powered by a windwheel

Sailboats and sailing ships have been using wind power for at least 8,000 years. Archaeological studies of the Cucuteni-Trypillian culture ceramics show use of sailing boats from the sixth millennium BCE onwards. Excavations of the Ubaid period (c. 6000–4300 BCE) in Mesopotamia provide direct evidence of sailing boats. Architects have used wind-driven natural ventilation in buildings since similarly ancient times. The use of wind to provide mechanical power came somewhat later in antiquity.

The Babylonian emperor Hammurabi had used wind mill power for his irrigation project in Mesopotamia in the 17th century BC.

Hero of Alexandria (Heron) in first-century Roman Egypt described what appears to be a wind-driven wheel to power a machine. His description of a wind-powered organ is not a practical windmill, but was either an early wind-powered toy, or a design concept for a wind-powered machine that may or may not have been a working device, as there is ambiguity in the text and issues with the design. Another early example of a wind-driven wheel was the prayer wheel, which is believed to have been first used in Tibet and China, though there is uncertainty over the date of its first appearance, which could have been either circa 400, the 7th century, or later.

== Early Middle Ages ==
The Persian horizontal windmill

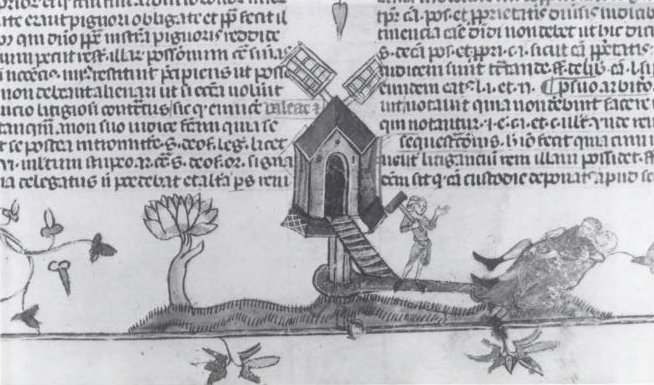
Medieval depiction of a windmill

Wind-powered machines used to grind grain and pump water, the windmill and wind pump, were developed in what are now Iran, Afghanistan and Pakistan by the 9th century. The first practical windmills were in use in Sistan, a region in Iran and bordering Afghanistan, at least by the 9th century and possibly as early as the mid-to-late 7th century. These Panemone windmills were horizontal windmills,^{[note 1]} which had long vertical driveshafts with six to twelve rectangular sails covered in reed matting or cloth. These windmills were used to pump water, and in the gristmilling and sugarcane industries. The use of windmills became widespread across the Middle East and Central Asia, and later spread to China and India. Vertical windmills were later used extensively in Northwestern Europe to grind flour beginning in the 1180s, and many examples still exist. By 1500 AD, windmills were used to pump seawater for salt-making in China and Sicily.

Wind-powered automata are known from the mid-8th century: wind-powered statues that "turned with the wind over the domes of the four gates and the palace complex of the Round City of Baghdad". The "Green Dome of the palace was surmounted by the statue of a horseman carrying a lance that was believed to point toward the enemy. This public spectacle of wind-powered statues had its private counterpart in the 'Abbasid palaces where automata of various types were predominantly displayed."

== Late Middle Ages ==
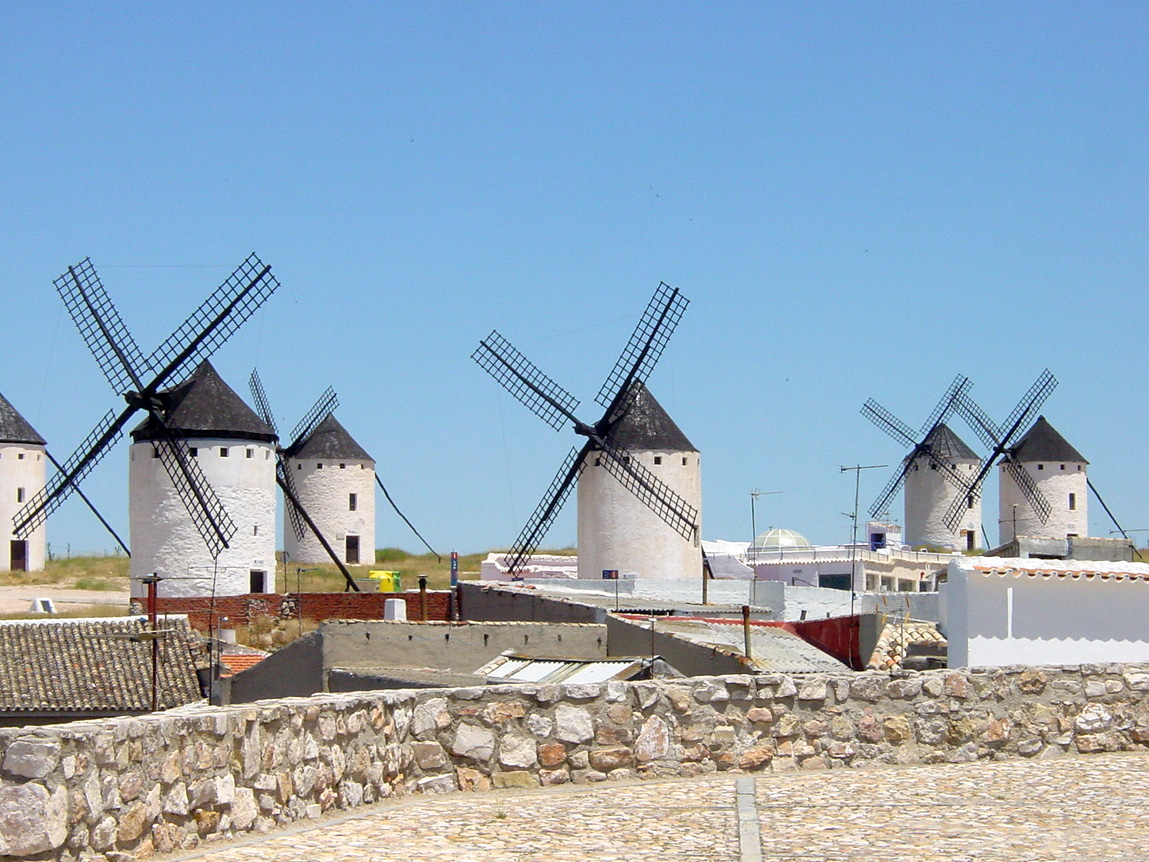
The vertical windmills of Campo de Criptana in Spain were immortalized in chapter VIII of the novel Don Quixote by Miguel de Cervantes.

The first windmills in Europe appear in sources dating to the twelfth century. These early European windmills were sunk post mills. The earliest certain reference to a windmill dates from 1185, in Weedley, Yorkshire, although a number of earlier but less certainly dated twelfth-century European sources referring to windmills have also been adduced. While it is sometimes argued that crusaders may have been inspired by windmills in the Middle East, this is unlikely since the European vertical windmills were of significantly different design than the horizontal windmills of Afghanistan. Lynn White Jr., a specialist in medieval European technology, asserts that the European windmill was an "independent invention;" he argues that it is unlikely that the Afghanistan-style horizontal windmill had spread as far west as the Levant during the Crusader period. In medieval England, rights to waterpower sites were often confined to nobility and clergy, so wind power was an important resource to a new middle class. In addition, windmills, unlike water mills, were not rendered inoperable by the freezing of water in the winter.

By the 14th century Dutch windmills were in use to drain areas of the Rhine River delta.

== 18th century ==
Windmills were used to pump water for salt making on the island of Bermuda, and on Cape Cod during the American revolution. In Mykonos and in other islands of Greece, windmills were used to mill flour and remained in use until the early 20th century. Many of them are now refurbished to be inhabited.

== 19th century ==
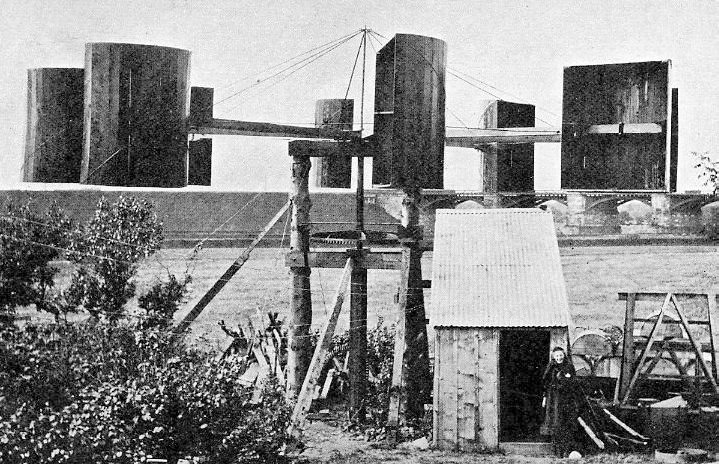
Blyth's windmill at his cottage in Marykirk in 1891

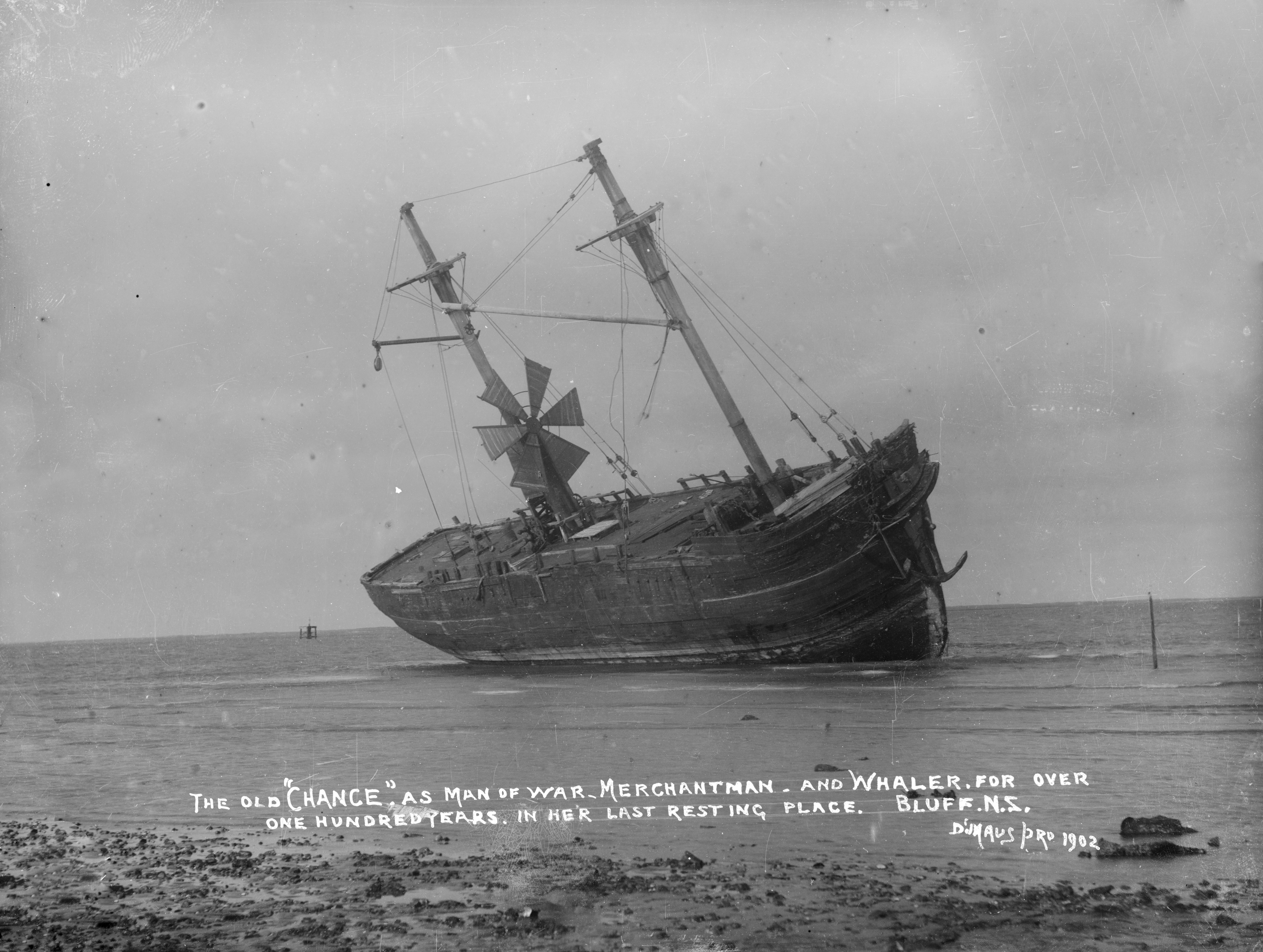
Wind-powered generators were used on ships by the end of the 19th century, as seen on the New Zealand sailing ship "Chance" (1902).

The first wind turbine used for the production of electricity was built in Scotland in July 1887 by Prof James Blyth of Anderson's College, Glasgow (the precursor of the University of Strathclyde). Blyth's 10 m high, cloth-sailed wind turbine was installed in the garden of his holiday cottage at Marykirk in Kincardineshire and was used to charge accumulators developed by the Frenchman Camille Alphonse Faure, to power the lighting in the cottage, thus making it the first house in the world to have its electricity supplied by wind power. Blyth offered the surplus electricity to the people of Marykirk for lighting the main street. However, they turned down the offer as they thought electricity was "the work of the devil." Although he later built a wind turbine to supply emergency power to the local Lunatic Asylum, Infirmary and Dispensary of Montrose, the invention never really caught on as the technology was not considered to be economically viable.

Across the Atlantic, in Cleveland, Ohio a larger and heavily engineered machine was designed and constructed between 1887 and 1888 by Charles F. Brush, this was built by his engineering company at his home and operated from 1888 until 1900. The Brush wind turbine had a rotor 17 m (56 foot) in diameter and was mounted on an 18 m (60 foot) tower. Although large by today's standards, the machine was only rated at 12 kW; it turned relatively slowly since it had 144 blades. The connected dynamo was used either to charge a bank of batteries or to operate up to 100 incandescent light bulbs, three arc lamps, and various motors in Brush's laboratory. The machine fell into disuse after 1900 when electricity became available from Cleveland's central stations, and was abandoned in 1908.

In 1891 Danish scientist, Poul la Cour, constructed a wind turbine to generate electricity, which was used to produce hydrogen by electrolysis to be stored for use in experiments and to light the Askov Folk High School. He later solved the problem of producing a steady supply of power by inventing a regulator, the Kratostate, and in 1895 converted his windmill into a prototype electrical power plant that was used to light the village of Askov.

In Denmark there were about 2,500 windmills by 1900, used for mechanical loads such as pumps and mills, producing an estimated combined peak power of about 30 MW.

In the American midwest between 1850 and 1900, a large number of small windmills, perhaps six million, were installed on farms to operate irrigation pumps. Firms such as Star, Eclipse, Fairbanks-Morse, and Aeromotor became famed suppliers in North and South America.

== 20th century ==
Development in the 20th century might be usefully divided into the periods:

- 1900–1973, when widespread use of individual wind generators competed against fossil fuel plants and centrally-generated electricity
- 1973–onward, when the oil price crisis spurred investigation of non-petroleum energy sources.

=== 1900–1973 ===
==== Danish development ====
In Denmark wind power was an important part of a decentralized electrification in the first quarter of the 20th century, partly because of Poul la Cour from his first practical development in 1891 at Askov. By 1908 there were 72 wind-driven electric generators from 5 kW to 25 kW. The largest machines were on 24 m (79 ft) towers with four-bladed 23 m (75 ft) diameter rotors. In 1957 Johannes Juul installed a 24 m diameter wind turbine at Gedser, which ran from 1957 until 1967. This was a three-bladed, horizontal-axis, upwind, stall-regulated turbine similar to those now used for commercial wind power development.

==== Farm power and isolated plants ====
In 1927 the brothers Joe Jacobs and Marcellus Jacobs opened a factory, Jacobs Wind in Minneapolis to produce wind turbine generators for farm use. These would typically be used for lighting or battery charging, on farms out of reach of central-station electricity and distribution lines. In 30 years the firm produced about 30,000 small wind turbines, some of which ran for many years in remote locations in Africa and on the Richard Evelyn Byrd expedition to Antarctica. Many other manufacturers produced small wind turbine sets for the same market, including companies called Wincharger, Miller Airlite, Universal Aeroelectric, Paris-Dunn, Airline and Winpower.

In 1931 the Darrieus wind turbine was invented, with its vertical axis providing a different mix of design tradeoffs from the conventional horizontal-axis wind turbine. The vertical orientation accepts wind from any direction with no need for adjustments, and the heavy generator and gearbox equipment can rest on the ground instead of atop a tower.

By the 1930s, windmills were widely used to generate electricity on farms in the United States where distribution systems had not yet been installed. Used to replenish battery storage banks, these machines typically had generating capacities of a few hundred watts to several kilowatts. Beside providing farm power, they were also used for isolated applications such as electrifying bridge structures to prevent corrosion. In this period, high tensile steel was cheap, and windmills were placed atop prefabricated open steel lattice towers.

The most widely used small wind generator produced for American farms in the 1930s was a two-bladed horizontal-axis machine manufactured by the Wincharger Corporation. It had a peak output of 200 watts. Blade speed was regulated by curved air brakes near the hub that deployed at excessive rotational velocities. These machines were still being manufactured in the United States during the 1980s. In 1936, the U.S. started a rural electrification project that killed the natural market for wind-generated power, since network power distribution provided a farm with more dependable usable energy for a given amount of capital investment.

In Australia, the Dunlite Corporation built hundreds of small wind generators to provide power at isolated postal service stations and farms. These machines were manufactured from 1936 until 1970.

==== Utility-scale turbines ====
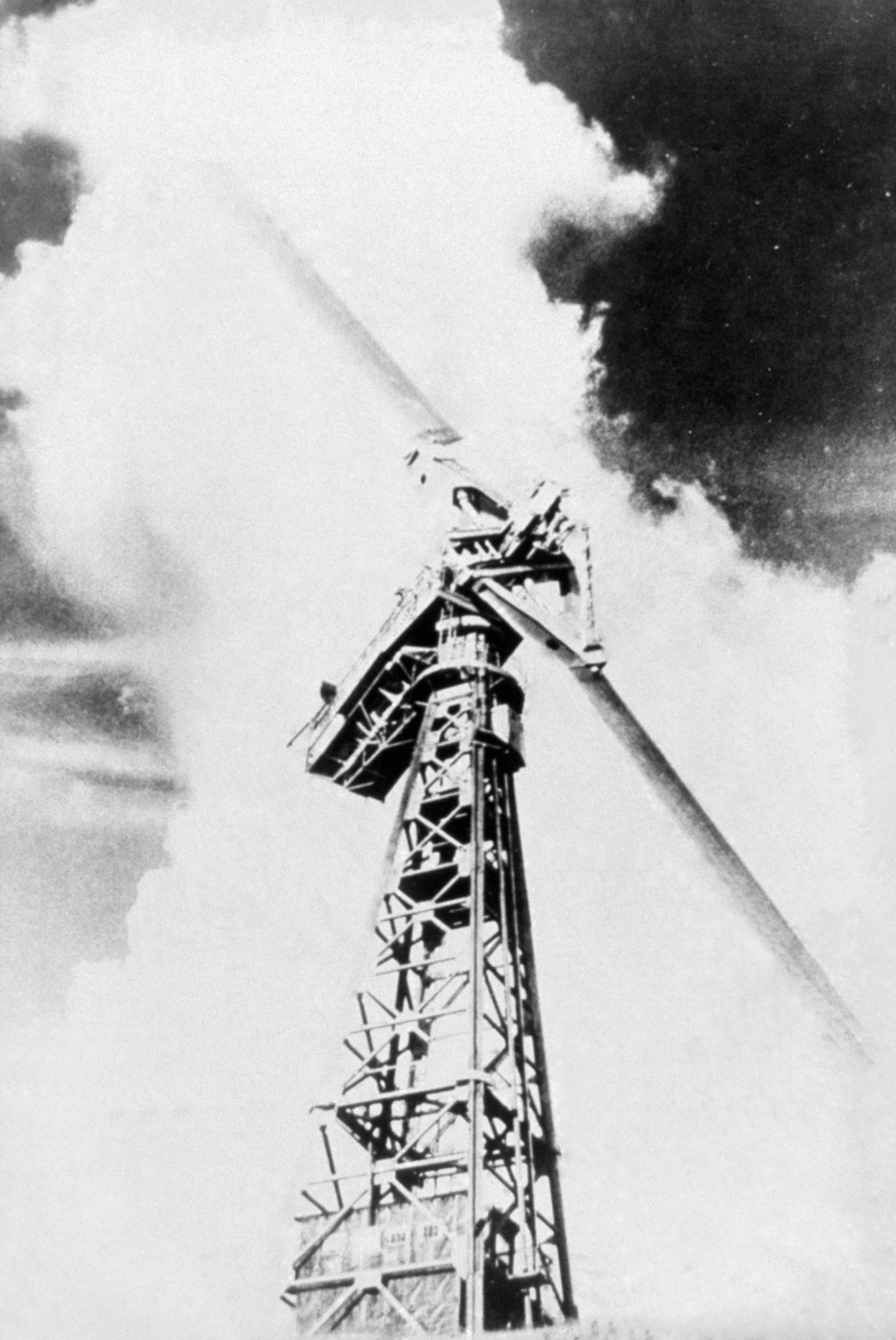
The world's first megawatt-sized wind turbine near Grandpa's Knob Summit, Castleton, Vermont

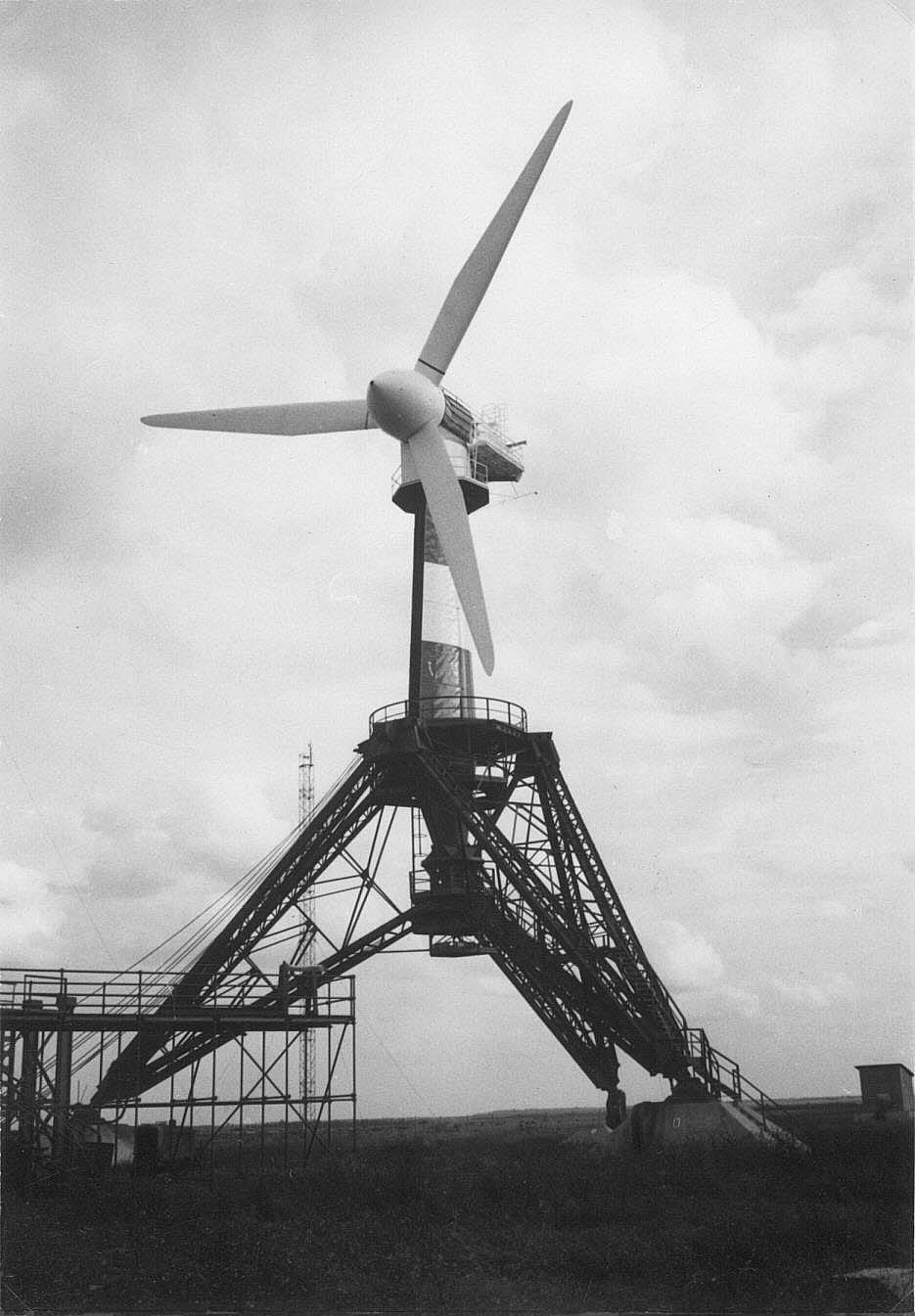
Experimental wind turbine at Nogent-le-Roi, France, 1955

A forerunner of modern horizontal-axis utility-scale wind generators was the WIME D-30 in service in Balaklava, near Yalta, USSR from 1931 until 1942. This was a 100 kW generator on a 30 m (100 ft) tower, connected to the local 6.3 kV distribution system. It had a three-bladed 30 metre rotor on a steel lattice tower. It was reported to have an annual load factor of 32 per cent, not much different from current wind machines.

In 1941 the world's first megawatt-size wind turbine was connected to the local electrical distribution system on the mountain known as Grandpa's Knob in Castleton, Vermont, United States. It was designed by Palmer Cosslett Putnam and manufactured by the S. Morgan Smith Company. This 1.25 MW Smith–Putnam turbine operated for 1100 hours before a blade failed at a known weak point, which had not been reinforced due to war-time material shortages. No similar-sized unit was to repeat this "bold experiment" for about forty years.

In 1951 a 100 kW wind turbine was built by John Brown and Company in Orkney, Scotland, for the North of Scotland Hydro-Electric Board, a state-owned regional electricity board. It supplied electricity to the island's public supply grid, establishing the utility of wind power for remote and island communities.

==== Fuel-saving turbines ====
During the Second World War, small wind generators were used on German U-boats to recharge submarine batteries as a fuel-conserving measure. In 1946 the lighthouse and residences on the island of Neuwerk were partly powered by an 18 kW wind turbine 15 metres in diameter, to economize on diesel fuel. This installation ran for around 20 years before being replaced by a submarine cable to the mainland.

The Station d'Etude de l'Energie du Vent at Nogent-le-Roi in France operated an experimental 800 KVA wind turbine from 1956 to 1966.

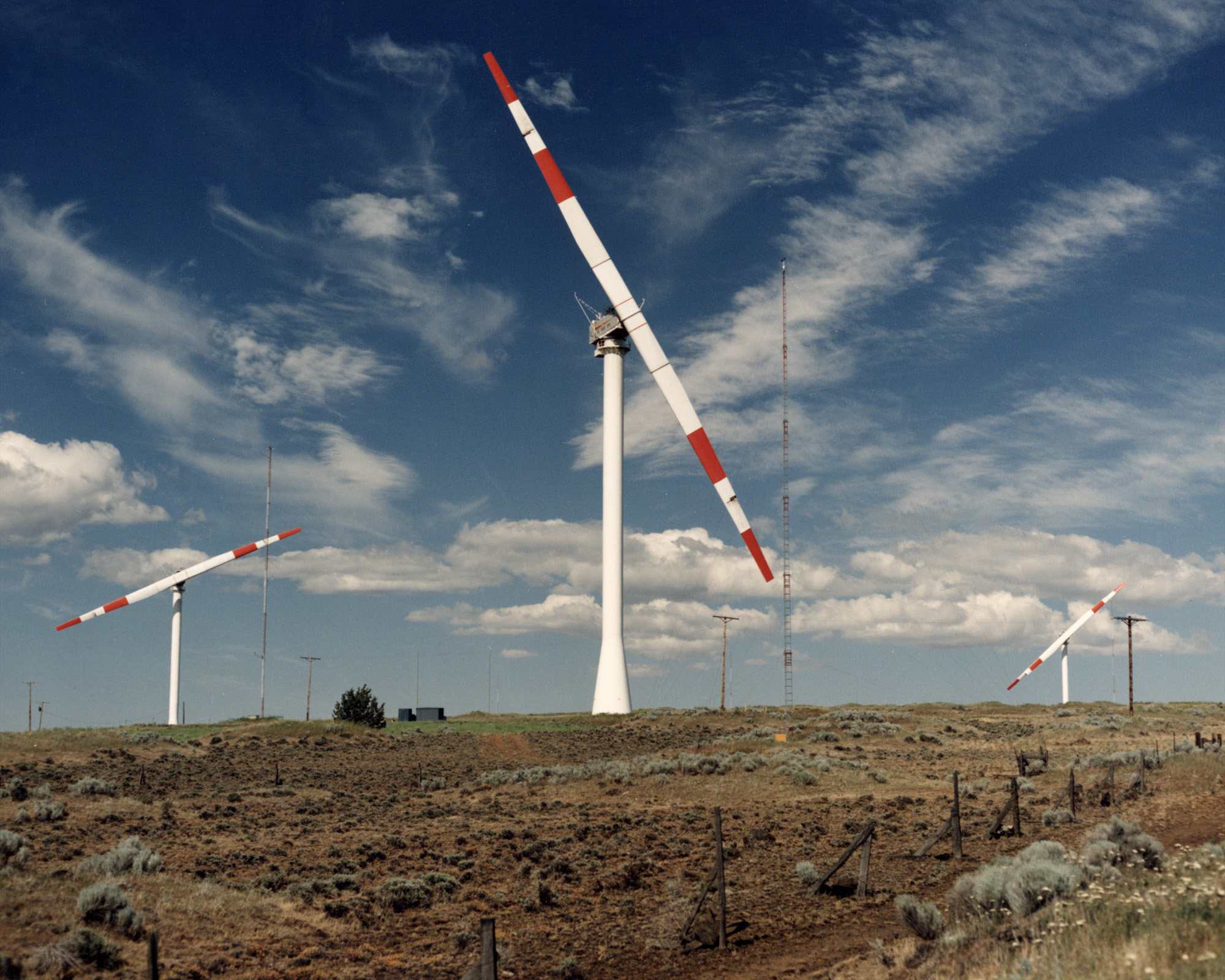
The NASA/DOE turbine cluster in Goodnoe Hills, Washington, in 1981, with three 2.5 megawatt Mod-2

Comparison of NASA wind turbines

=== 1973–2000 ===
==== US development ====
From 1974 through the mid-1980s the United States government worked with industry to advance the technology and enable large commercial wind turbines. The NASA wind turbines were developed under a program to create a utility-scale wind turbine industry in the U.S. With funding from the National Science Foundation and later the United States Department of Energy (DOE), a total of 13 experimental wind turbines were put into operation, in four major wind turbine designs. This research and development program pioneered many of the multi-megawatt turbine technologies in use today, including: steel tube towers, variable-speed generators, composite blade materials, partial-span pitch control, as well as aerodynamic, structural, and acoustic engineering design capabilities. The large wind turbines developed under this effort set several world records for diameter and power output. The MOD-2 wind turbine cluster of three turbines produced 7.5 megawatts of power in 1981. In 1987, the MOD-5B was the largest single wind turbine operating in the world with a rotor diameter of nearly 100 meters and a rated power of 3.2 megawatts. It demonstrated an availability of 95 percent, an unparalleled level for a new first-unit wind turbine. The MOD-5B had the first large-scale variable speed drive train and a sectioned, two-blade rotor that enabled easy transport of the blades. The 4 megawatt WTS-4 held the world record for power output for over 20 years. Although the later units were sold commercially, none of these two-bladed machines were ever put into mass production. When oil prices declined by a factor of three from 1980 through the early 1990s, many turbine manufacturers, both large and small, left the business. The commercial sales of the NASA/Boeing Mod-5B, for example, came to an end in 1987 when Boeing Engineering and Construction announced they were "planning to leave the market because low oil prices are keeping windmills for electricity generation uneconomical."

Later, in the 1980s, California provided tax rebates for wind power. These rebates funded the first major use of wind power for utility electricity. These machines, gathered in large wind parks such as at Altamont Pass would be considered small and un-economic by modern wind power development standards.

==== Danish development ====
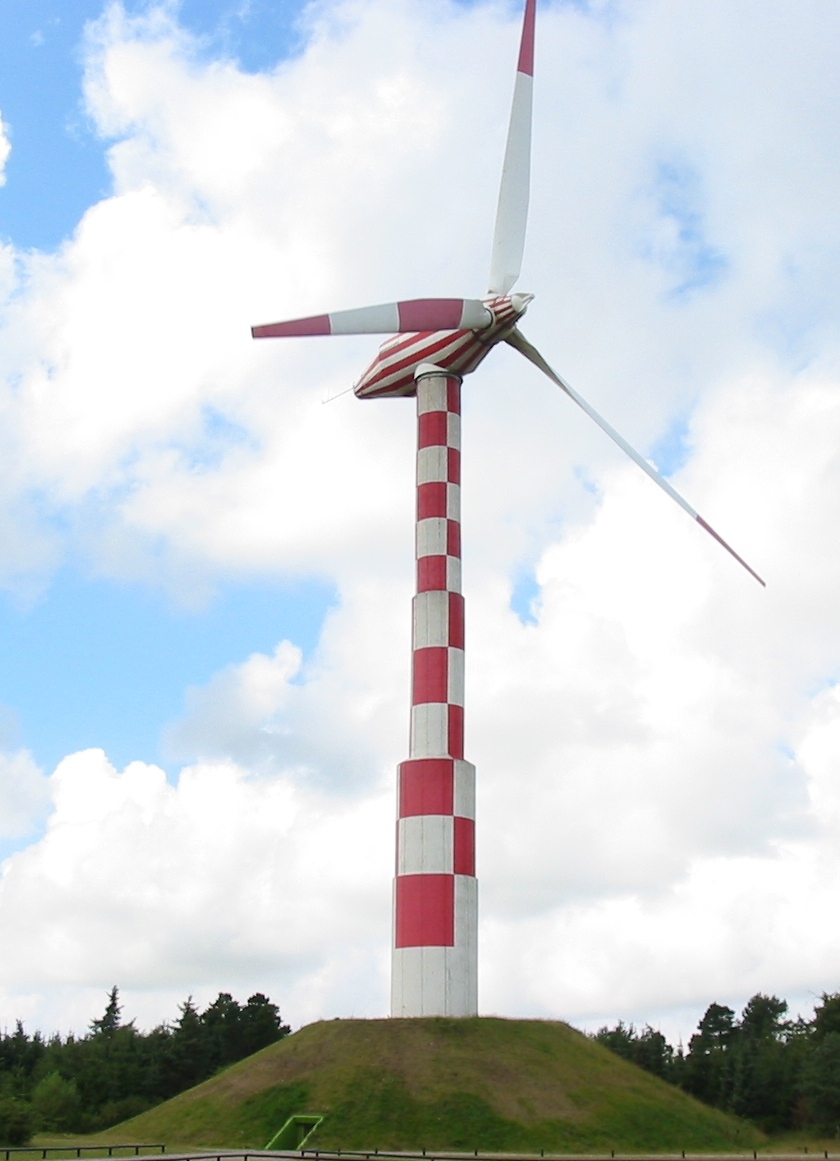
Tvindkraft, the world's first multi-megawatt wind turbine was built near Tvind in Denmark

A giant change took place in 1978 when the world's first multi-megawatt wind turbine Tvindkraft was constructed near Tvind in Denmark. It pioneered many technologies used in modern wind turbines and allowed Vestas, Siemens and others to get the parts they needed. Especially important was the novel wing construction using help from German aeronautics specialists. The power plant was capable of delivering 2MW, had a tubular tower, pitch controlled wings and three blades. It was built by the teachers and students of the Tvind school. Before completion these "amateurs" were much ridiculed. The turbine still runs today and looks almost identical to the newest most modern mills.

Danish commercial wind power development stressed incremental improvements in capacity and efficiency based on extensive serial production of turbines, in contrast with development models requiring extensive steps in unit size based primarily on theoretical extrapolation. A practical consequence is that all commercial wind turbines resemble the Danish model, a light-weight three-blade upwind design.

All major horizontal axis turbines today rotate the same way (clockwise) to present a coherent view. However, early turbines rotated counter-clockwise like the old windmills, but a shift occurred from 1978 and on. The individualist-minded blade supplier Økær made the decision to change direction in order to be distinguished from the collective Tvind and their small wind turbines. Some of the blade customers were companies that later evolved into Vestas, Siemens, Enercon and Nordex. Public demand required that all turbines rotate the same way, and the success of these companies made clockwise the new standard.

==== German non-development ====
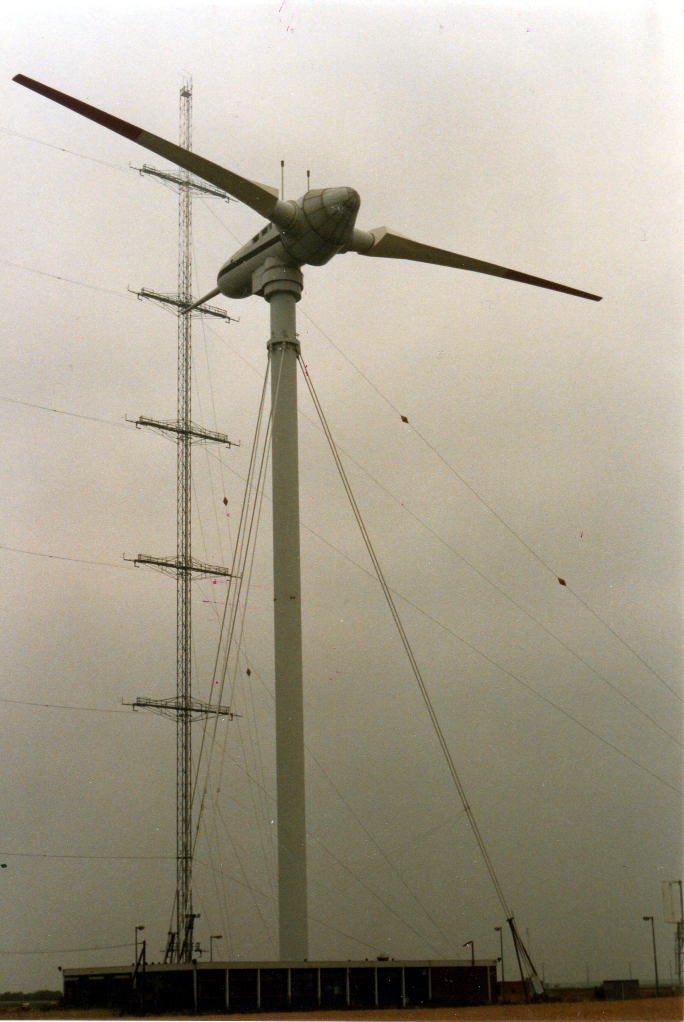
German 3MW Growian in 1984, with one of its wind gauge pylons

In 1976, the then-West German Federal Ministry of Education and Research (BMFT) decided to use research contracts and expert consultation to investigate the development of large wind turbines. This led to Design by committee in 1978, with some of the partners publicly expressing interest in Growian (and wind turbines in general) failing, so as to demonstrate that nuclear power in Germany had no viable alternative. The basic contract between the partners of 3 January 1978 stipulated that after the project's conclusion, the installation was "anticipated to be dismantled and scrapped".

The partners as well as the BMFT also had political motives connected with the project. Günther Klätte, management board member of major (coal) energy provider RWE, stated during a general business meeting: "We require Growian [in the general sense of large wind turbines] as a proof of failure of concept", and he noted that "the Growian is a kind of pedagogical tool to convert the anti-nuclear energy crowd to the true faith". A similar statement regarding the incurred financial burdens was reported of Minister of Finance and former Minister of Research Hans Matthöfer: "We know it won't do anything for us. But we do it to demonstrate to the wind energy advocates that it doesn't work." After the Green Party had derided the installation as the electricity provider's "fig leaf" on the occasion of groundbreaking in May 1981, the RWE took internal measures to make sure that publicly a position of open-mindedness towards alternative energy production was emphasized while public interest in wind energy was diminished.

The single Growian (short for German Große Windenergie-Anlage - "Large wind energy plant") was a two-bladed "lee runner" (the rotor was situated on the downwind side of the tower) with a hub height of about 100 metres (330 ft), and at 3 Megawatt, it was the world largest at the time, being operated since 1983. After a series of problems, it was dismantled in 1988. It took about 20 years until similar size turbines were again made and installed in Germany.

In 2024, wind power in Germany provided a third of the electricity in Germany, after the Energiewende (German for 'energy turnaround') phased out nuclear power in 2023. Domestic generation is about 60% renewable, half of that coming from wind.

==== Romania ====
The development of wind turbines in Romania began in the second half of the 1970s. Hidrotim built four wind turbines, starting in 1982, in Semenic-Caraș Gorge National Park on the Semenic at 45.184271°N 22.071252°E. These turbines had a nacelle height of 35 metres and a rotor diametre of 30 metres and were able to generate 300 kW power. In 1989, the first wind turbine became operational. After the end of communism the project was stopped in 1992. The turbines were looted and later demolished.

==== Self-sufficiency and back-to-the-land ====
In the 1970s many people began to desire a self-sufficient life-style. Solar cells were too expensive for small-scale electrical generation, so some turned to windmills. At first they built ad hoc designs using wood and automobile parts. Most people discovered that a reliable wind generator is a moderately complex engineering project, well beyond the ability of most amateurs. Some began to search for and rebuild farm wind generators from the 1930s, of which Jacobs Wind Electric Company machines were especially sought after. Hundreds of Jacobs machines were reconditioned and sold during the 1970s.

Following experience with reconditioned 1930s wind turbines, a new generation of American manufacturers started building and selling small wind turbines not only for battery-charging but also for interconnection to electricity networks. An early example would be Enertech Corporation of Norwich, Vermont, which began building 1.8 kW models in the early 1980s.

In the 1990s, as aesthetics and durability became more important, turbines were placed atop tubular steel or reinforced concrete towers. Small generators are connected to the tower on the ground, then the tower is raised into position. Larger generators are hoisted into position atop the tower and there is a ladder or staircase inside the tower to allow technicians to reach and maintain the generator, while protected from the weather.

== 21st century ==
Wind energy generation by region

As the 21st century began, fossil fuel was still relatively cheap, but rising concerns over energy security, global warming, and eventual fossil fuel depletion led to an expansion of interest in all available forms of renewable energy. The fledgling commercial wind power industry began expanding at a robust growth rate of about 25% per year, driven by the ready availability of large wind resources, and falling costs due to improved technology and wind farm management.

The steady run-up in oil prices after 2003 led to increasing fears that peak oil was imminent, further increasing interest in commercial wind power. Even though wind power generates electricity rather than liquid fuels, and thus is not an immediate substitute for petroleum in most applications (especially transport), fears over petroleum shortages only added to the urgency to expand wind power. Earlier oil crises had already caused many utility and industrial users of petroleum to shift to coal or natural gas. Wind power showed potential for replacing natural gas in electricity generation on a cost basis.

By 2021 wind energy produced 4872 terawatts-hour, 2.8% of the total primary energy production and 6.6% of the total electricity production. Technological innovations continue to drive new developments in the application of wind power. By 2015, the largest wind turbine were 8MW capacity Vestas V164 for offshore use. By 2014, over 240,000 commercial-sized wind turbines were operating in the world, producing 4% of the world's electricity. Total installed capacity exceeded 336GW in 2014 with China, the U.S., Germany, Spain and Italy leading in installations.

In the United States, wind energy received a boost from the government's production tax credit (PTC) promoting wind energy, however these have since expired and have not been renewed as of 2022. From a pricing standpoint, General Electric (a producer of wind-turbine technology) noted an increase in steel prices detrimentally impacting supply of wind as a result of inflation. PTC has a benefit for a period of 10 years from the date of construction, ranging from 1 cent to 1.9 cents per kWh. The credit was intended as temporary, but was renewed 13 times. In some states such as Nebraska, there has been local push back against wind projects with local groups rejecting wind energy projects. As a result, wind supplies over 8% of the United States' power, and reached a record peak of 24.5% share of power. Large projects are required to deliver the wind energy to markets where the power is needed. In Colorado, Xcel Energy approved a $1.7 billion project for power line transmission of 560 miles.

In Europe, wind has faced similar pressures from global steel prices, in addition to pressure resulting from Russia's war in Ukraine. As a result, European wind original equipment manufacturers (OEMs) have faced issues with profitability with market share moving to China. In the United States, the Department of Energy estimates 60% to 75% for towers and up to 30% to 50% for blades and hubs are produced domestically.

=== Floating wind-turbine technology ===
Offshore wind power began to expand beyond fixed-bottom, shallow-water turbines beginning late in the first decade of the 2000s. The world's first operational deep-water large-capacity floating wind turbine, Hywind, became operational in the North Sea off Norway in late 2009 at a cost of some 400 million kroner (around US$62 million) to build and deploy.

These floating turbines are a very different construction technology—closer to floating oil rigs rather—than traditional fixed-bottom, shallow-water monopile foundations that are used in the other large offshore wind farms to date.

By late 2011, Japan announced plans to build a multiple-unit floating wind farm, with six 2-megawatt turbines, off the Fukushima coast of northeast Japan where the 2011 tsunami and nuclear disaster had created a scarcity of electric power. The initial evaluation phase was due to be completed in 2016, "Japan plans to build as many as 80 floating wind turbines off Fukushima by 2020" at a cost of some 10–20 billion Yen. However, approximately 60 billion Yen were ultimately spent by the Japanese government on test wind projects at Fukushima between November 2013 and December 2020 when it was decided that a combination of technical issues and lack of commerciality justified closing and decommissioning the structures as of April 2021.

=== Airborne turbines ===
Airborne wind energy systems use airfoils or turbines supported in the air by buoyancy or by aerodynamic lift. The purpose is to eliminate the expense of tower construction, and allow extraction of wind energy from steadier, faster, winds higher in the atmosphere. As yet no grid-scale plants have been constructed. Many design concepts have been demonstrated.

== See also ==
- Wind power in Ohio –History
- Growian – 1980s experimental turbine, at the time the largest ever built
- Timeline of solar cells
- Energy development
- Outline of energy
- Smart grid research
- Timeline of sustainable energy research 2020–present#Wind power
- List of years in science

== Notes ==
1. The terms "horizontal" and "vertical" refer to the plane of rotation of the sails. Modern wind turbines are generally referred to by the plane of rotation of the main axle (windshaft). Thus a horizontal mill may also be described as a "vertical-axis windmill" and a vertical mill may also be described as a "horizontal-axis windmill".
