= Putnam =

Putnam may refer to:

== People ==
- Putnam (surname)

== Places ==
=== Canada ===
- Putnam, Ontario, community in Thames Centre

=== United States ===
- Putnam, Alabama
- Putnam, Connecticut, a New England town
  - Putnam (CDP), Connecticut, the main village in the town
- Putnam, Illinois
- Putnam, Kansas
- Putnam, New York
- Putnam, Oklahoma
- Putnam, Texas
- Putnam Lake, New York
- Putnam Valley, New York
- Putnam County (disambiguation)
- Putnam Township (disambiguation)

== Other uses ==
- Putnam Classification System in library organization
- William Lowell Putnam Mathematical Competition, or simply the Putnam Competition
- Putnam Cottage, historic site in Greenwich, Connecticut
- Putnam Division, portion of New York and Putnam Railroad routes
- Putnam Investments, American investment management firm
- Putnam Magazine, regional lifestyle magazine that covers Putnam County, New York
- Putnam's Magazine, 19th and early 20th century monthly American publication
- Putnam model, cost-estimation method in software engineering
- Putnam Museum and IMAX Theater in Davenport, Iowa
- G. P. Putnam's Sons, at times called "Wiley and Putnam", "Putnam Press", "Putnam Penguin", American book publisher
- Putnam, the Iron Son of '76, American play (1844)

== See also ==
- The 25th Annual Putnam County Spelling Bee, musical play
- Putnam House (disambiguation), historical homes of the Putnam family
- Putnam Park (disambiguation), parks in the United States
- Putnam-Parker Block, historic block of buildings in Davenport, Iowa
- List of places named for Israel Putnam
