= Paderborn Wind Farm =

Wind farm in Germany

The Paderborn Wind Farm in Germany consists of 11 Vestas V-66 wind turbines, each 76m high with a 1.65 MW rated power, making a total installed capacity of 18.2 MW. The wind farm is sited near Paderborn in North Rhine-Westphalia, was initiated locally by a group of developers, and is owned by 91 shareholders. Commissioning was in November 2000.

Germany is the world's largest user of wind power with an installed capacity of 20,621 MW in 2006. More than 18,000 wind turbines are located in the German federal area and the country has plans to build more wind turbines.

== See also ==
- Wind power in Germany
