= S. Morgan Smith =

American turbine manufacturer

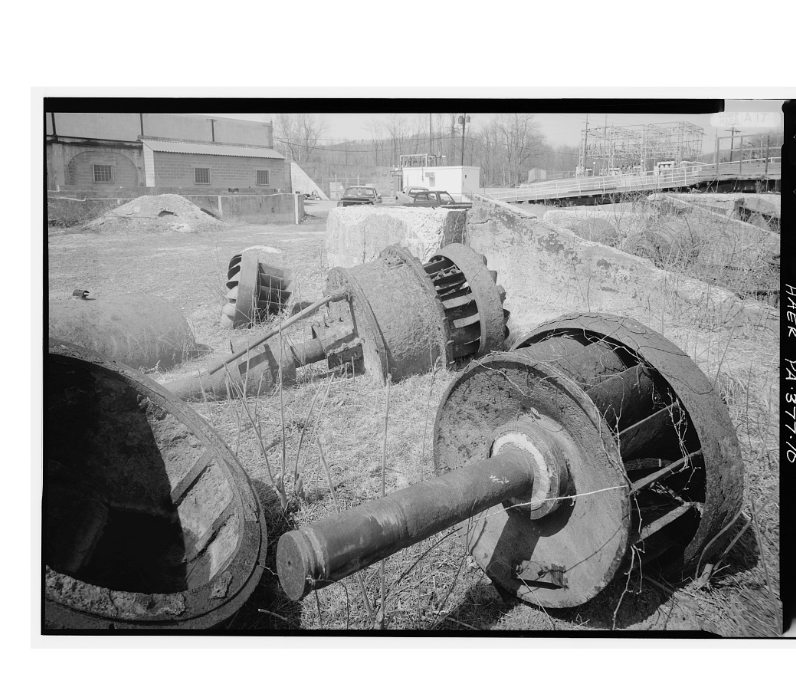
- Discarded S. Morgan Smith turbines at Warrior Ridge Dam in Petersburg, Pennsylvania
- Industry: Manufacturing
- Founded: 1877
- Successor: Allis-Chalmers, Voith Hydro
- Headquarters: York, Pennsylvania
- Products: Turbines

S. Morgan Smith was an American manufacturer of turbines, founded by Stephen Morgan Smith in York, Pennsylvania. It was founded in 1877 shortly after Smith received a patent for an improved turbine. It became the country's largest manufacturer of hydroelectric turbines. The company's ability to manufacture large equipment was utilized during World War I to manufacture machines used to make large artillery guns and in World War II to make various large components. The company was purchased by Allis-Chalmers and later spun-off to Voith Hydro.

== History ==
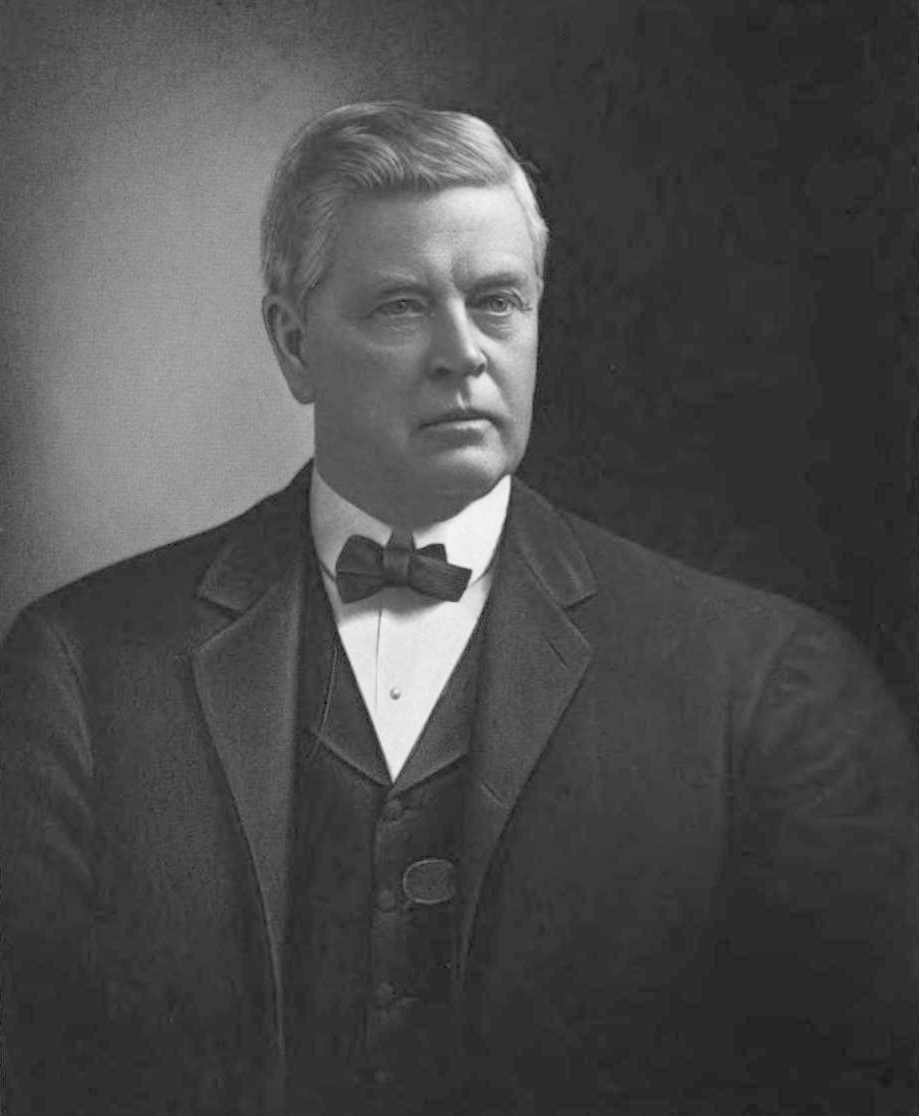
Stephen Morgan Smith (1839–1903)

Smith held a washing machine patent which he exchanged in 1874 for part-ownership of the York Manufacturing Company which was founded to produce the machines. His partner, Oliver J. Bollinger, signed over his rights to an 1870 turbine water wheel. Bollinger left the company in 1875 to produce an improved turbine at his own company. Smith took over improvements on the 1870 turbine, and received his first turbine U.S. patent 185,788 on December 26, 1876, 17 days after the application was filed with the US Patent Office, for an improved turbine waterwheel. Smith personally retained the patent rights to the "Success" turbine and contracted with York to manufacture it.

Smith founded S. Morgan Smith in 1877 when it made its first sale of the turbine to a mill in Paradise Township, York County, Pennsylvania. Smith used York Manufacturing and other machine shops to manufacture his products through the 1880s. The Smith company was incorporated in 1886 and built its first factory in 1890, then employing 20 workers. The company expanded to 166 employees by 1899 and was ranked as the 10th largest factory in the county.

By 1908, the company was manufacturing the McCormick turbine, the New Success turbine, and its newest model, the Smith Turbine. The company's turbines were operating across the US and in many foreign countries producing waterpower to operate mills that spun cotton, sawed lumber, ground flour. Hydroelectric turbines powered melting furnaces at steel mills, pumped water for irrigation, and generated electricity for the lighting and transportation. By 1920, the York plant was the largest manufacturer of turbines and employed 750 employees.

== World War I ==
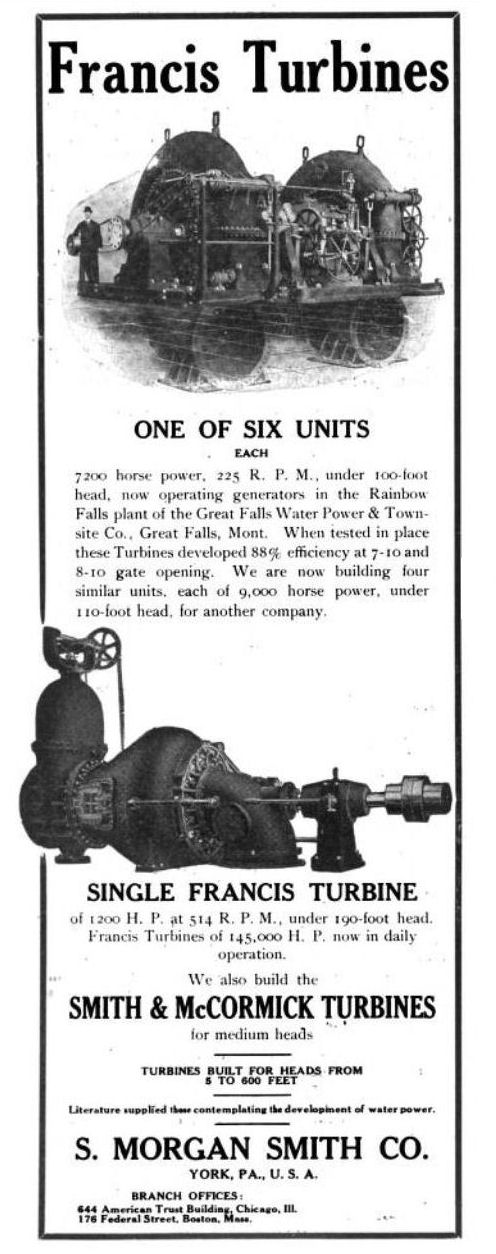
1911 advertisement for Francis-type reaction turbines

The York plant turned to the war effort, beginning with the manufacture in 1915 of two 50-inch (1,300 mm) 500,000 lb (230,000 kg) gun boring lathes that Bethlehem Steel ordered. They also produced a 480,000 lb (220,000 kg) slicing lathe and 12 30-inch (760 mm) boring mills. Later, Bethlehem placed orders for even larger machines, including the nine machines necessary for Bethlehem to product guns with up to a 20-inch (510 mm) bore. Another 14 large gun lathes were ordered, making the plants output 90% war related production. The designs were further expanded to fill an order by US Steel for still larger machines for large gun production at a new gun plant at Neville Island. These machines would have weighted over 1,500,000 lb (680,000 kg) but were not completed before the end of the war.

== World War II ==
During World War II, Smith continued to manufacture turbines and other equipment to power other industries' war production. Direct war production included aircraft carrier hydropneumatic catapults, gun mounts for the 8-inch gun M1 and 240 mm howitzer M1, other equipment and parts for aircraft carriers, landing barges, ship engine parts, armor plating, turret rings, tracks and frames for tanks, and a variety of other parts.

== Wind ==
By the 1920s and 30s, the industry was suffering from a lack of new hydroelectric projects as most dam sites had been developed. The company president in 1939, Beauchamp Smith, decided to turn to wind turbines for new opportunities. Wind turbines could power electric generators, as well as pump water for pumped-water storage for hydraulic generation. Smith partnered with Palmer Putnam, an engineer who had been working on a wind generator since 1934. The first Smith-Putnam wind turbine was operational in August 1941. The machine was a two-bladed 1.25 MW turbine with a 53 m (174 ft) rotor diameter. It ran at a constant speed by adjusting the angle of the blades as the wind speed changed. The turbine was connected to a 600rpm General Electric generator. The generator, the world's largest at the time, was installed on a mountaintop near Rutland, Vermont.

The site was picked because it was within range of the customer, Central Vermont Public Service, the ridge was high and sharp which meteorologists believe caused accelerated wind speed, and had tree deformities suggesting wind impact over many years.

After cracks in the blades were welded in May 1942, the turbine ran until February 1943 when the main bearing failed. Repair, much slowed by World War II delays, was completed in March 1945. Three weeks later, one of the eight-ton blades broke off the turbine permanently ending its operation.

This project, which operated for over a thousand hours, demonstrated that wind power could be generated and supplied into the nation's electric grid at the MW-scale. The experiment was ended because it was not believed at the time that electricity could be generated a cost competitive with other sources. It was the largest wind turbine ever built until 1979.

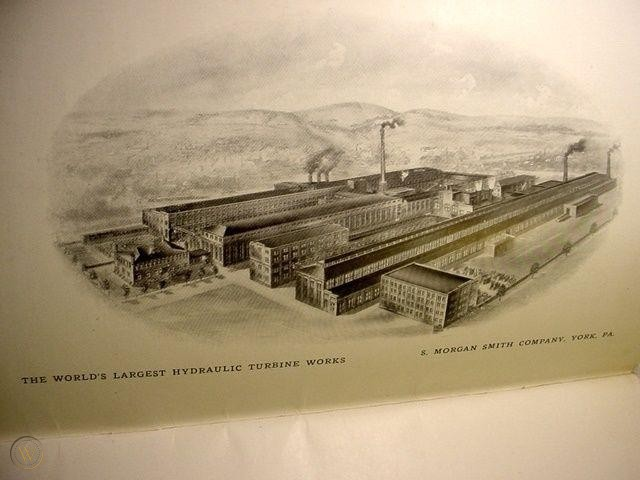
The factory as depicted in a 1919 company catalog, with the assertion it is the "World's largest hydraulic turbine works"
