= Growian =

Defunct German wind energy experiment derailed by conflicting interests

GROWIAN
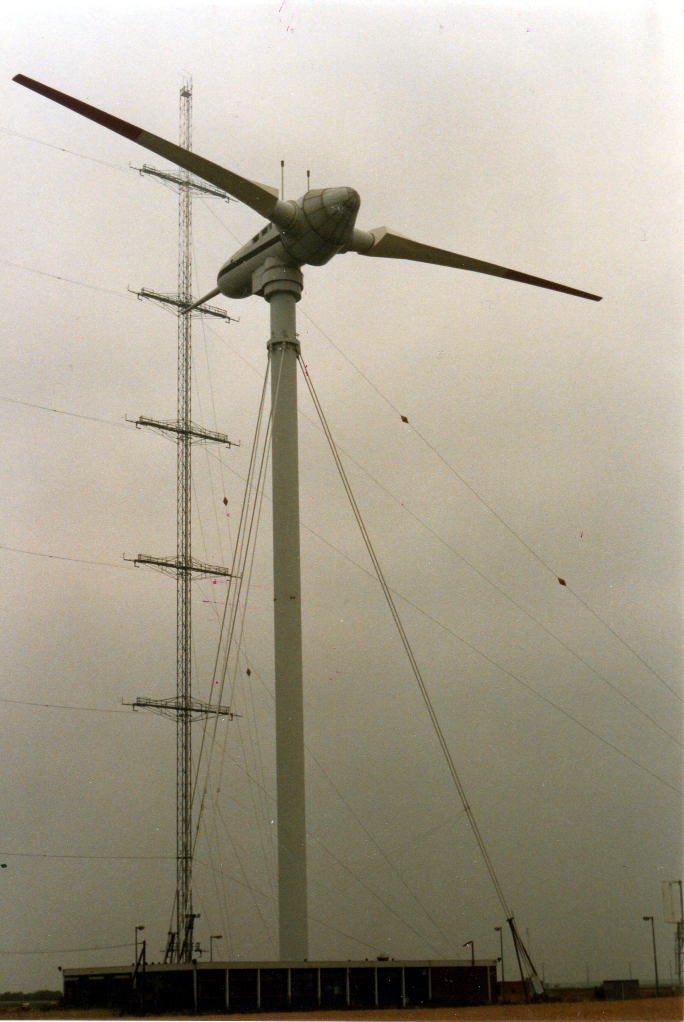
- GROWIAN in 1984, with one wind gauge pylon
- Country: Germany
- Location: Schleswig-Holstein
- Coordinates: 53.927333°N 8.950066°E
- Status: Decommissioned
- Construction began: 1976
- Commission date: 1983
- Decommission date: 1987
- Owner: Growian GmbH
- Operator: Growian GmbH

Wind farm
- Type: Onshore
- Hub height: 100 metres (330 ft)
- Rotor diameter: 100 metres (330 ft)
- Rated wind speed: 12 metres per second (39 ft/s)

Power generation
- Nameplate capacity: 3 MW
- Annual net output: 12 GWh

External links
- Commons: Related media on Commons

Growian or GROWIAN (short for German "Große Windenergieanlage" - "Large wind turbine") was a publicly funded wind turbine built in the Kaiser-Wilhelm-Koog near Marne for purposes of technology testing in the 1980s. It was a two-bladed "lee runner" (the rotor was situated on the downwind side of the tower) with a hub height of about 100 metres (330 ft) and, at 3 megawatts, it was the world's largest at the time, being operated since 1983. It was a design by committee, with some partners even expressing interest in the project to fail, which it duly did. Its failure delayed the progress of wind power in Germany and Energiewende (German for 'energy turnaround') by twenty-five years.

For a long time Growian was the world's largest wind turbine. Many features of the installation were novel and had not previously been tested at this scale. Due to manufacturing faults in the casing, the turbine could not be run at full performance, and various issues with materials and construction prevented continuous testing. Consequently, the installation was idle for the greater part of the period between the first test run on 6 July 1983 (official start of operations was 4 October 1983) and end of operations in August 1987. Growian was decommissioned over the course of 1987, and dismantled in summer 1988.

== Technical specification ==
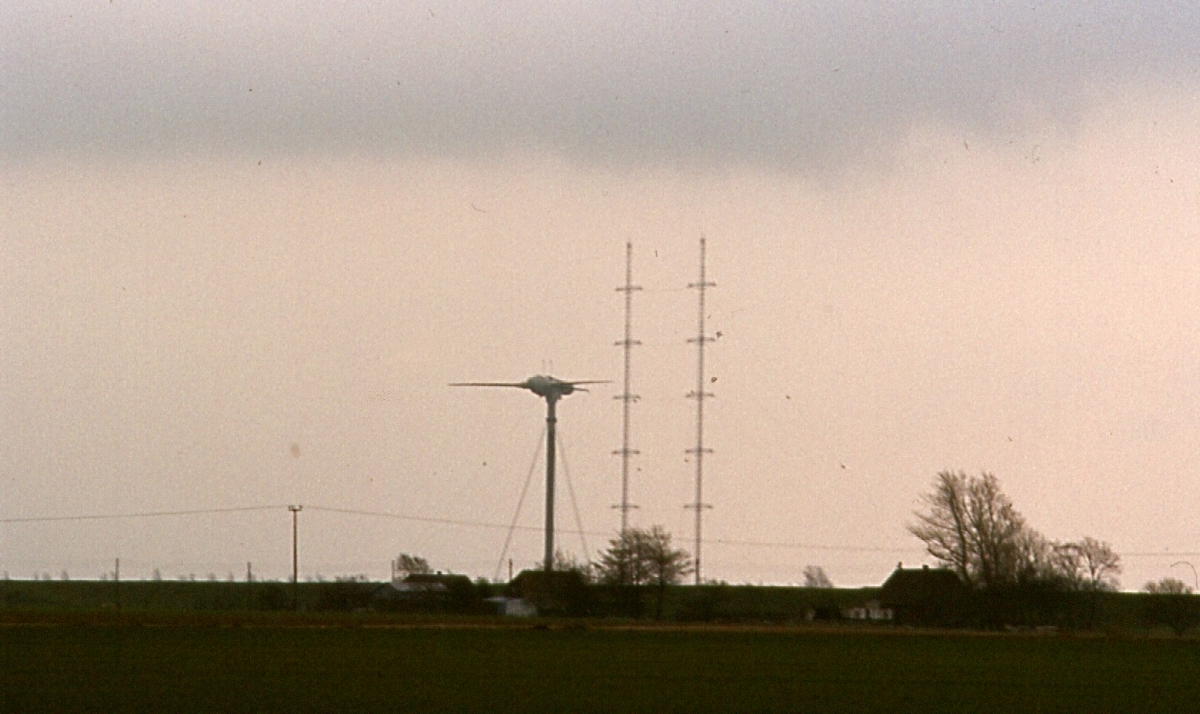
GROWIAN with its two wind gauge pylons

Growian's power rating was 3,000 kW, at the time the highest in the world. The rotor had an oscillating nave, a diameter of 100.4 metres (329 ft), and revolved at approximately 19.5 rpm. The orientation of the two blades was regulated by a mechanical-electrical mechanism. In contrast to most modern turbines, the blades rotated on the leeward side of the tower.

The turbine house at a height of 100 metres (330 ft) weighed 340 t, and each blade weighed 23 t.

The turbine had a switching on speed of 5.4 m/s (12 mph) and a rated speed of 12 m/s (27 mph). It would cut out at a speed of 24 m/s (54 mph) and was rated for a maximum survivable speed of 60 m/s (134 mph). Projected annual energy yield at a mean wind speed of 9.3 m/s (21 mph) was approximately 12 GWh.

Rotor and induction generator were mechanically coupled by a gearing mechanism consisting of one spur gear and two epicyclic gears. Feed-in to the power grid was realized using a set of motor–generators that was largely identical to that later used at Umspannwerk Neuhof, one of the few electrical substations that allowed for electricity import from the GDR. The rotors were constructed using steel walers, and in cross section consisted of a steel core, an outer skin, and fibreglass reinforcement rods.

The tower and one of the rotors are on display at the Technik Museum Sinsheim.

The total cost of the installation was about 87 million Deutsche Mark.

== Development and outcomes ==
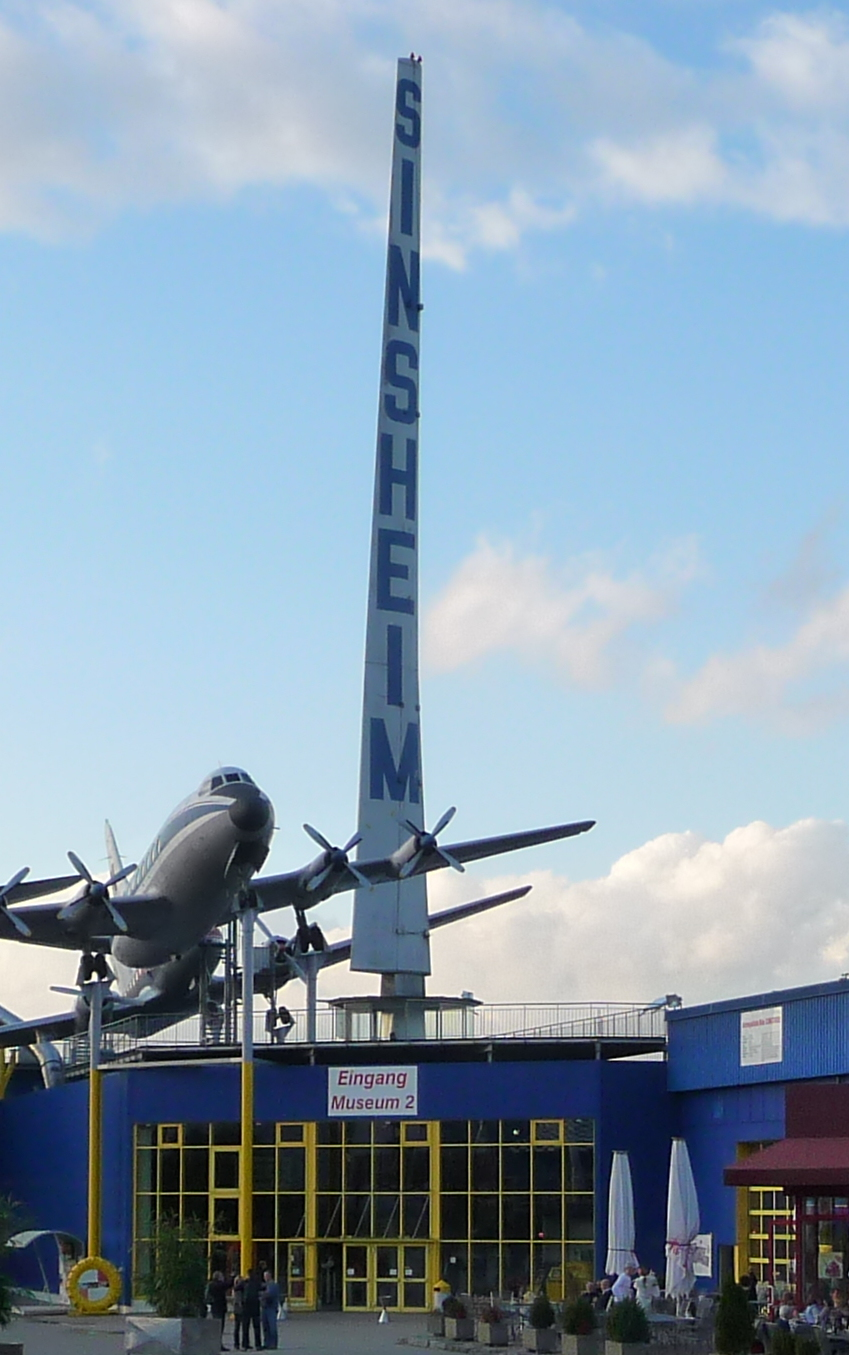
Growian rotor blade with museum logo at Technik Museum Sinsheim

Toward the end of 1976, the German Federal Ministry of Education and Research (BMFT) decided to use research contracts and expert consultation to investigate the development of large wind turbines. This decision, taken as a result of public pressure, ran contrary to the stalling efforts of the major energy providers. Contracts were awarded to MAN SE, the Institute for Aerodynamics and Gas Dynamics at the University of Stuttgart, and the University of Regensburg. In 1978 the BMFT decided to construct the world's largest wind turbine with a tower height and blade diameter of 100 m. MAN SE was chosen as main contractor, and the formation of a construction and operation company was given into the charge of the reluctant Hamburgische Electricitäts-Werke (HEW). This led to the formation of the Growian GmbH on 8 January 1980, of which HEW held 46.7%, Schleswag held 30.1%, and RWE held 23.2%.

Overall and technical direction were the responsibility of HEW, while Schleswag dealt with commercial management. The basic contract between the partners of 3 January 1978 stipulated that after the project's conclusion, the installation was "anticipated to be dismantled and scrapped".

The partners as well as the BMFT also had political motives connected with the project. Günther Klätte, management board member of RWE, stated during a general business meeting: "We require Growian [in the general sense of large wind turbines] as a proof of failure of concept", and he noted that "the Growian is a kind of pedagogical tool to convert the anti-nuclear energy crowd to the true faith". A similar statement regarding the incurred financial burdens was reported of Minister of Finance and former Minister of Research Hans Matthöfer: "We know it won't do anything for us. But we do it to demonstrate to the wind energy advocates that it doesn't work." After the Green Party had derided the installation as the electricity provider's "fig leaf" on the occasion of groundbreaking in May 1981, the RWE took internal measures to make sure that publicly a position of open-mindedness toward alternative energy production was emphasized while public interest in wind energy was alloyed.

Insuperable structural load and material problems occurred, not least due to the two-bladed lee runner configuration. The installation turned out to be a failure in most respects, spent substantially more time under repair than up and running, and was not even capable of sustained test operation. When it was decommissioned it had only logged a total of 420 hours in active operation.

Growian is regarded as one of the largest failures in the history of wind power and did not fulfill any of the expectations riding on its conception. What few insights were gained found little application in wind turbine construction. Some lessons were however learned from conceptional mistakes made in its construction, e.g., the futility of trying to reach profitable installation sizes without taking intermediate steps.

The point of view that multi-MW-yield wind turbines were technically and commercially infeasible gained some currency after the failure of the project, but was eventually superseded by technical progress, twenty-five years later. Beginning with the late 2000s, twenty-five years after Growian was decommissioned, installations with identical dimensions and yield (100 m rotor diameter, 3 MW net yield) were being produced in large numbers, a class of turbines that has continued to dominate the market and to push forward the mean net yield of newly installed turbines. As of 2015, substantially larger installations with yields up to 8 MW and rotor diameters of up to 170 m are present in the offshore sector. In contrast to Growian, however, these turbine types were incrementally developed from smaller installations in the 0.1 MW range.

Growian's former location is still being used for wind power generation. In 1988, Germany's first wind farm, the Windenergiepark Westküste, was built on a 20 hectare section of the former test area. It initially comprised 30 smaller turbines with net yields of 10-25 kW, provided by three different wind turbine manufacturers. After being repowered twice, the wind farm today consists of four major installations with 1-2 MW yield, in addition to a test area for small wind turbines and an information center presenting the history of wind power.
