= Putnam County =

Putnam County is the name of nine counties in the United States of America:

- Putnam County, Florida
- Putnam County, Georgia
- Putnam County, Illinois
- Putnam County, Indiana
- Putnam County, Missouri
- Putnam County, New York
- Putnam County, Ohio
- Putnam County, Tennessee
- Putnam County, West Virginia

== Other meanings ==
- "Putnam County", a song by Tom Waits on his 1975 album Nighthawks at the Diner
- The 25th Annual Putnam County Spelling Bee is a musical by William Finn and Rachel Sheinkin

== See also ==
- Putnam (disambiguation)
