= Tvindkraft Wind Turbine =

Wind turbine in Denmark

Coordinates: 56°15′21″N 8°16′50″E

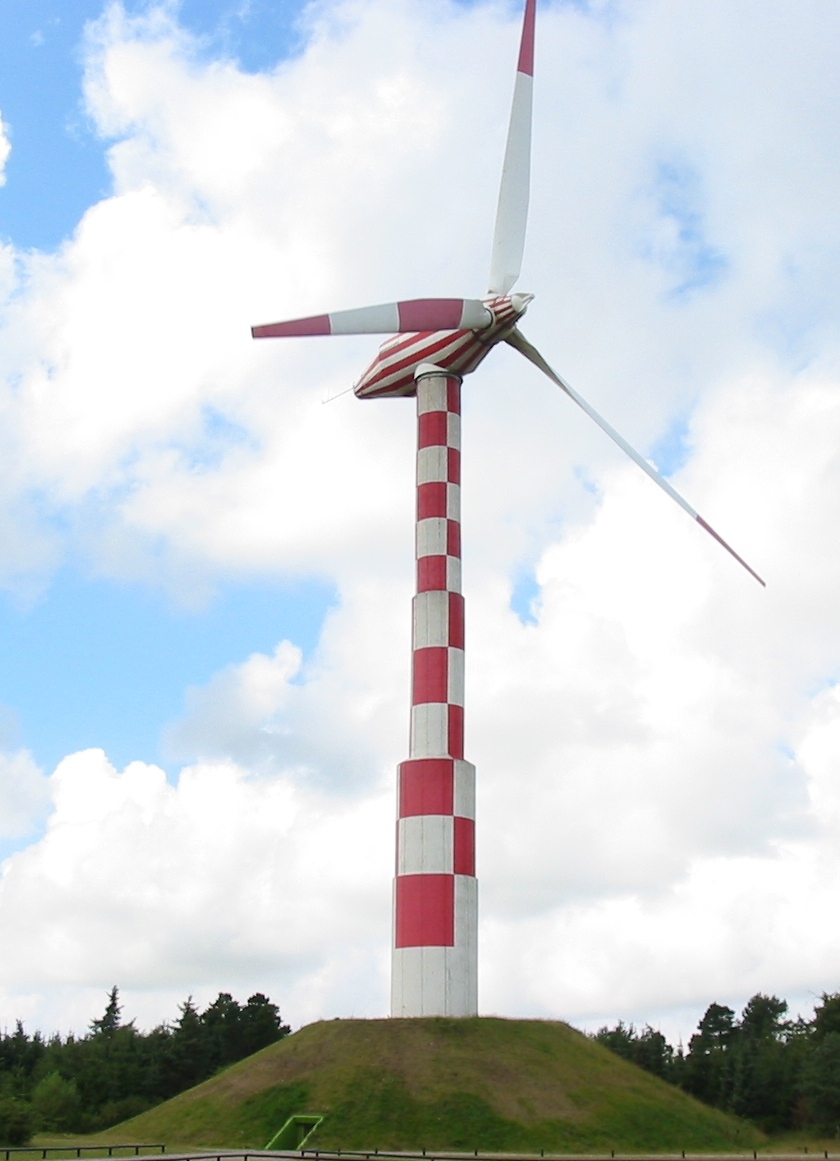
Tvindkraft Wind Turbine

Tvindkraft Wind Turbine or Tvindmøllen is a 2 MW wind turbine owned by the school cooperative Tvind near Ulfborg in West Jutland, Denmark. Tvindkraft Wind Turbine set off real research and development in wind energy in a number of areas. Among other things, Risø DTU started working on aerodynamics problems, after researchers from this institute calculated the blades of the Tvindmøllen. Tower and cone are built of iron-reinforced concrete. The pinnacle is made of rolled steel sheets. The wings are made of fiberglass. The mill runs today with all original parts except the blades and blade bearings, which have been replaced.

== History ==
Between 1978 and 2000, the 54-metre-high wind turbine was the tallest wind turbine in Denmark. It began to produce electricity in spring 1978, and in the autumn of this year it began to produce electricity for Ringkjøbing County's High Voltage Association. In the first years of operation, the public grid could only take 400 kW, although the turbine was already able to deliver 1 MW. The excess power was used to produce electricity for a 500 kW immersion boiler, which heated water for the central heating system at Tvind school.

In July 2007, the turbine had made 117,540 operating hours, 100,000,000 revolutions, and produced 16 GWh. From the beginning, the mill only ran at half power, with a maximum output of approx. 1 MW instead of 2 MW. The reason was that the turbine had to run faster than it could, which was evident during the test run. History has later shown that 1 MW is exactly the power a turbine with blades of 27 m can produce. It also meant that Tvind got a lower-performing mill, which, in turn, could live longer. It turned out at the beginning of the operating period that the blades hit the tower's self-oscillating frequency when rotating with 27 revolutions per minute. Therefore, the rotor speed is limited to a maximum of 21 revolutions per minute.
