= Putnam Township =

Putnam Township may refer to:

- Putnam Township, Fayette County, Iowa
- Putnam Township, Linn County, Iowa
- Putnam Township, Anderson County, Kansas
- Putnam Township, Stafford County, Kansas
- Putnam Township, Michigan
- Putnam Township, Pennsylvania
