= Putnam Park (disambiguation) =

Putnam Park may refer to

- Putnam Park, a natural area owned by the University of Wisconsin–Eau Claire
- Putnam Memorial State Park, in Redding, Connecticut
- Helen Putnam Regional Park, a regional park southwest of Petaluma, California
