= William Putnam =

William Putnam may refer to:

- William LeBaron Putnam (1835–1918), Maine lawyer and politician and United States federal judge
- William Lowell Putnam (1861–1923), American lawyer and banker
- Bill Putnam (1920–1989), American audio engineer
- Bill Putnam (basketball) (1922–1992), American basketball player
- William Lowell Putnam III (1924–2014), alpinist, author and broadcasting executive
- Will Putnam (born 2000), American football player
