= James Putnam =

James Putnam may refer to:

- James Putnam (judge) (1725–1789), Attorney General in Massachusetts; judge and politician in New Brunswick
- James Putnam (Nova Scotia politician) (1756–1838), politician in Nova Scotia
- James Jackson Putnam (1846–1918), American neurologist
- James O. Putnam (1818–1903), New York politician
- James Putnam (curator), independent curator of art and historical exhibitions
- James E. Putnam (born 1940), American politician in the state of South Dakota
- James D. Putnam (1859–1917), American politician, lawyer, and businessman

== See also ==
- James Putnam Jr. House, Danvers, Massachusetts
