= Windpark Holtriem =

Wind farm in Lower Saxony, Germany

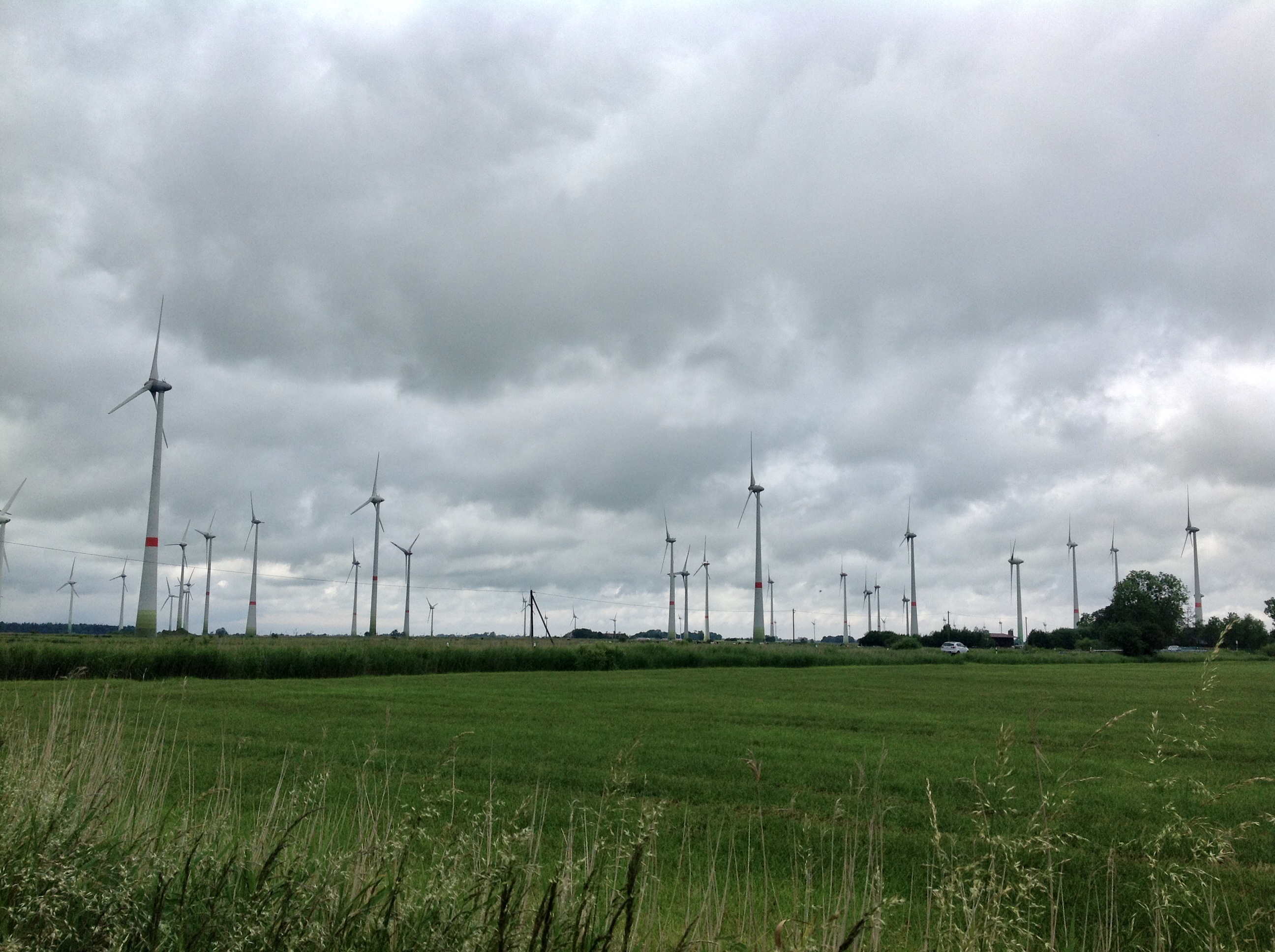
- Country: Germany
- Coordinates: 53°36′37″N 7°25′45″E

Power generation
- Nameplate capacity: 207 MW

The Windpark Holtreim wind farm is a wind farm in Lower Saxony, Germany Constructed in 1998, Windpark Holtriem is one of the largest European windfarms, comprising thirty-three Enercon E-66 wind turbines. Holtriem is a low-lying area adjacent to the North Sea in East Frisia (Lower Saxony, Germany).

One wind turbine, situated at 53°34′52″N 7°28′31″E is equipped with an Observation deck open to visitors, at a height of 63 metres. It can be reached by 297 stairs.

== See also ==
- List of towers
