= Wind power in Germany =

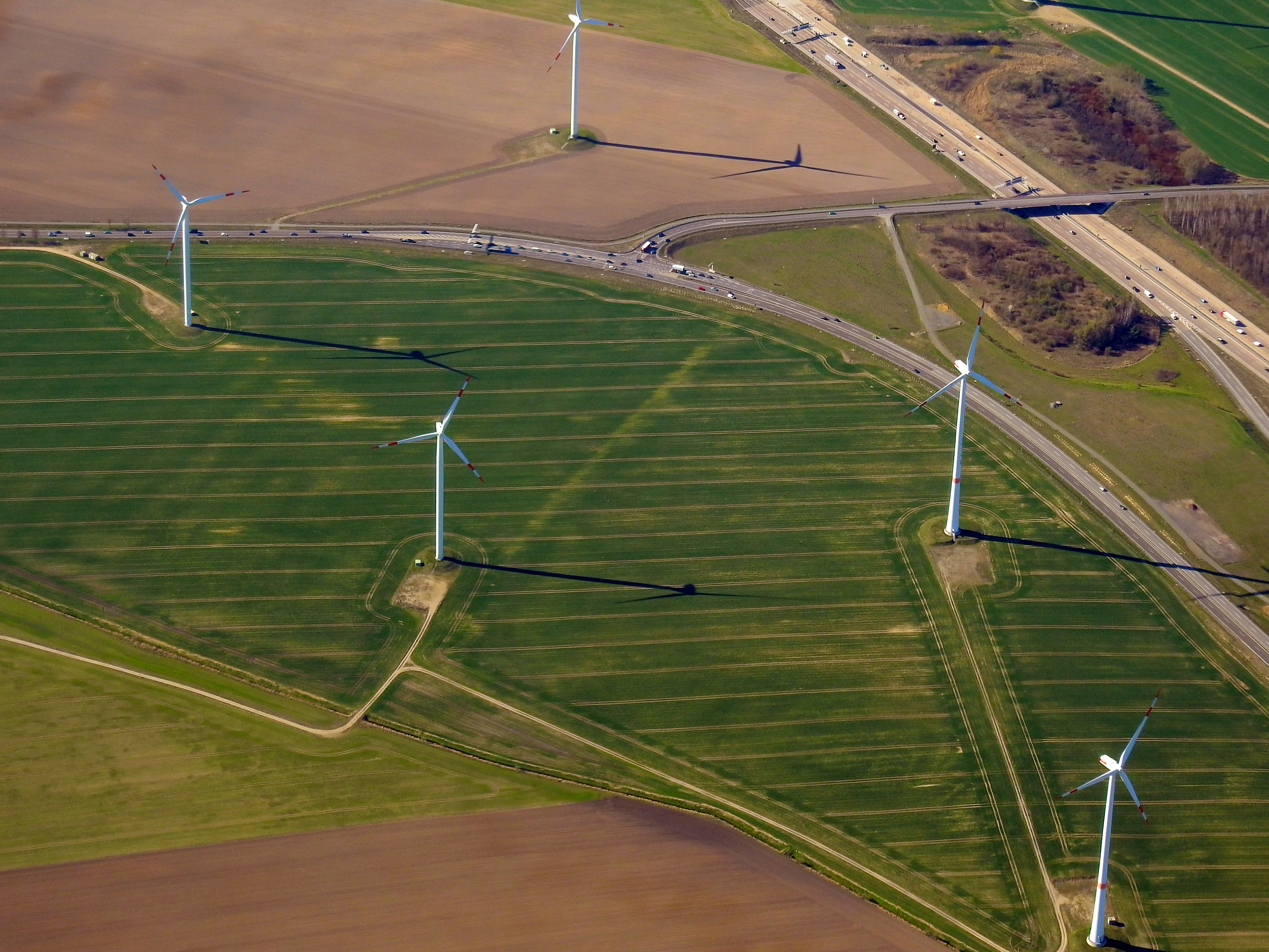
Wind farm in Panketal

German electricity by source in 2025

- Brown coal: 67.13 TW⋅h (16.3%)
- Hard coal: 26.16 TW⋅h (6.3%)
- Natural gas: 53.64 TW⋅h (13.0%)
- Wind: 131.17 TW⋅h (31.8%)
- Solar: 70.13 TW⋅h (17.0%)
- Biomass: 36.06 TW⋅h (8.7%)
- Hydro: 16.72 TW⋅h (4.1%)
- Oil: 2.82 TW⋅h (0.7%)
- Other: 8.93 TW⋅h (2.2%)
Net generated electricity in 2025

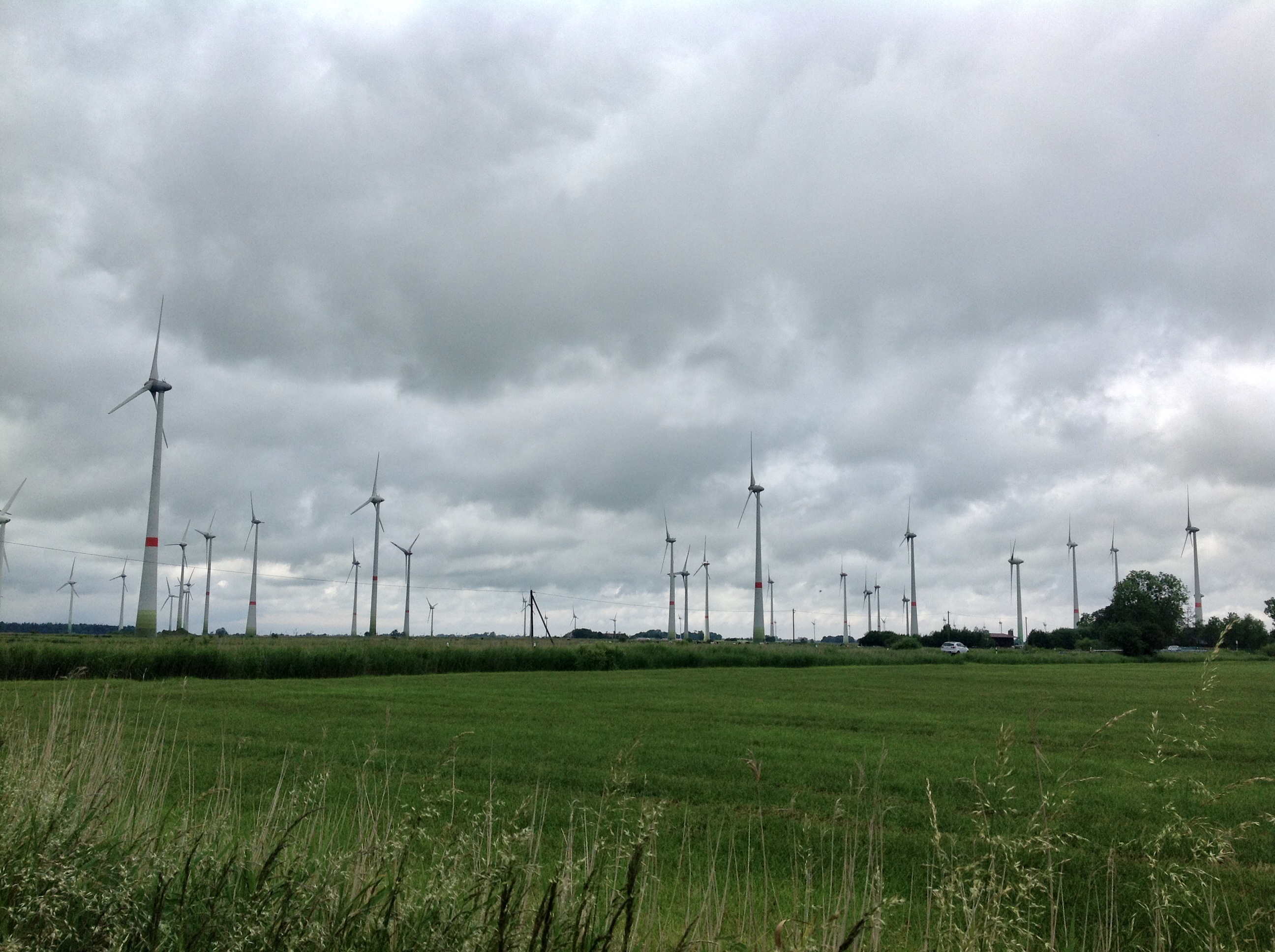
Windpark Holtriem in East Frisia, adjacent to the North Sea

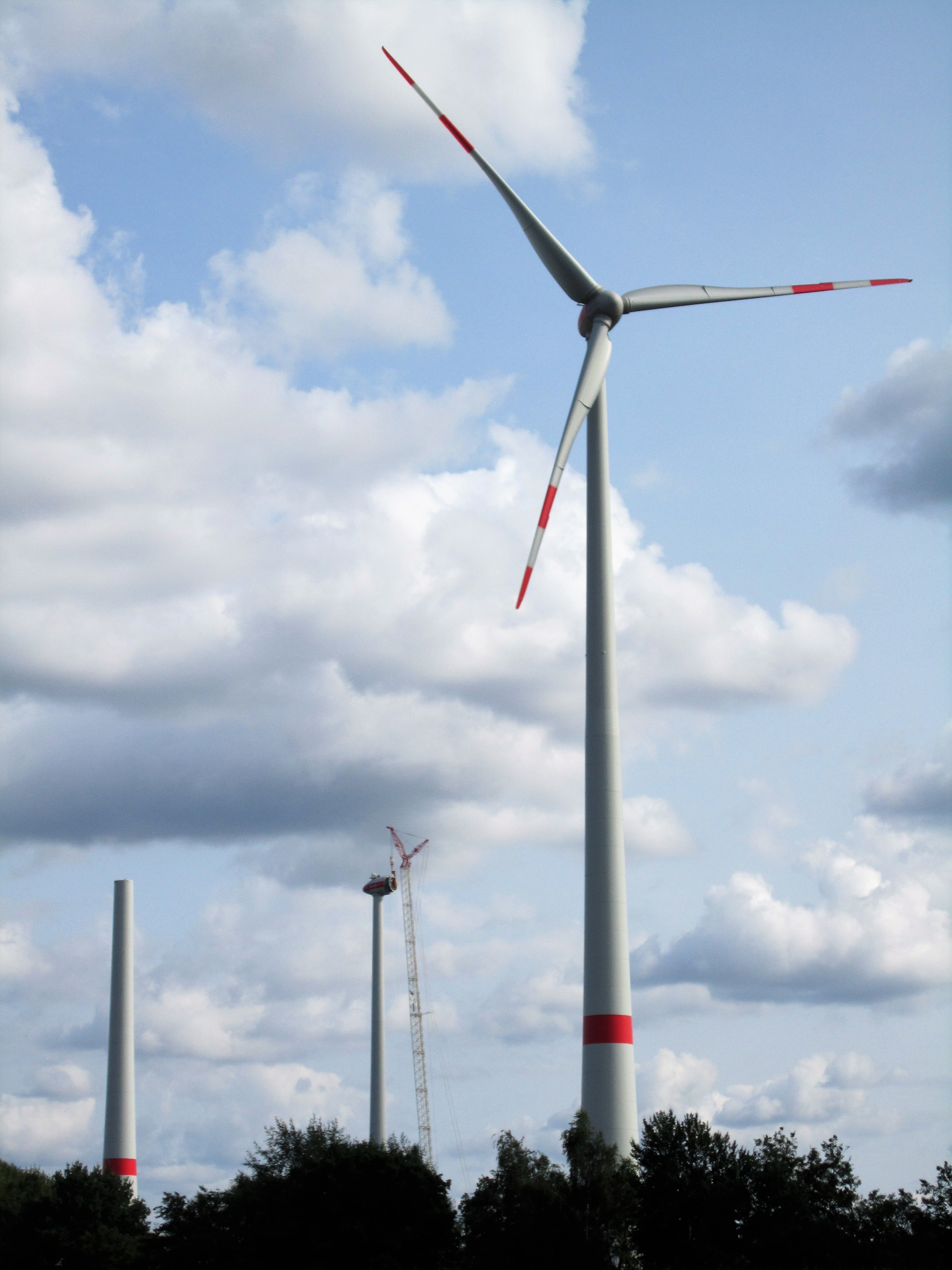
Erection of a turbine (2017)

Enercon turbines size comparison

Wind power is a major source of electricity in Germany and the Energiewende (German for 'energy turnaround') that has phased out nuclear power in 2023. Domestic generation is about 60% renewable, half of that coming from wind.

About a third of Germany's total electricity production in 2024 was generated through wind power, up from 6.2% in 2010 and 1.6% in 2000. In 2024, wind power produced 136.9 TWh, of which 111.9 TWh onshore (25.9% of electricity consumption) and 26 TWh offshore. At the end of 2024, the total installed wind power nameplate capacity was 72.75 gigawatts (GW): 63.55 GW onshore (28,717 wind turbines) and 9.2 GW (1,639 wind turbines) offshore.

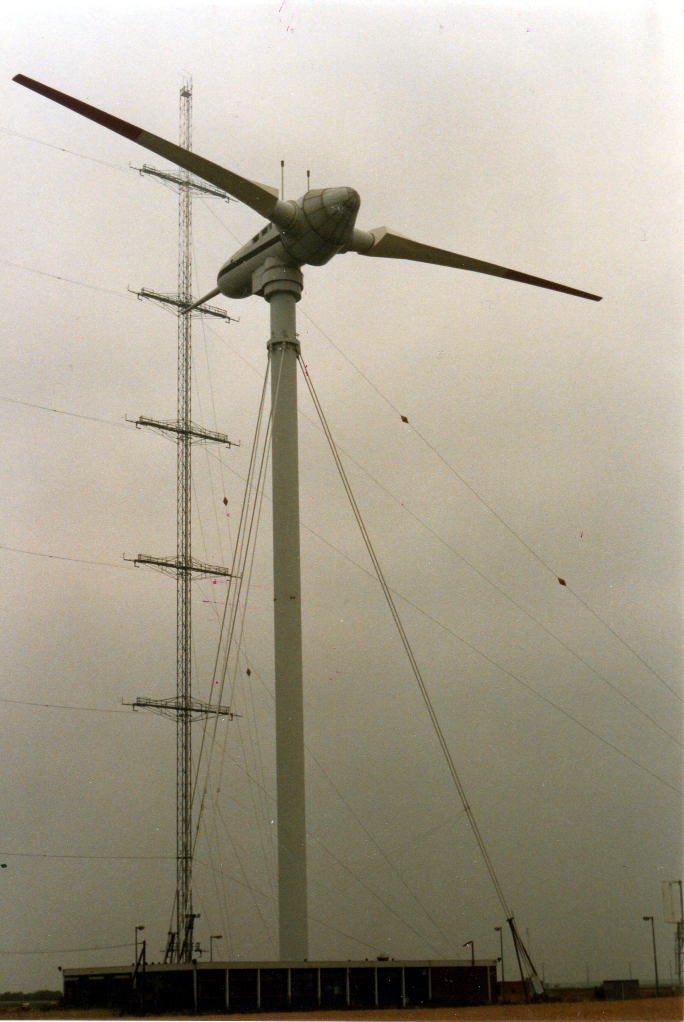
1984 Growian with one wind gauge pylon

Despite proposals for very large Reichskraftturm wind towers between the World Wars, and the 3 Megawatt Growian project of 1976-1988 being the failure it was intended to be by some, wind power anyway became a growing industry in the country, with a number of turbine manufacturers, like Enercon, Nordex and Senvion.

The German Federal Government has enacted plans to expand offshore wind energy, with targets of 30 gigawatts by 2030, increasing to 70 gigawatts by 2045. This move is part of a strategy to enhance the country's renewable energy portfolio and reduce dependence on energy imports. To achieve these goals, the government is implementing measures to streamline planning and approval processes for wind energy projects. In 2024, the construction of 2,405 new wind turbines (14.056 GW) has been approved, a new record.

== World leader in wind power capacity ==
The United Kingdom has the best potential wind resources in Europe; Germany has far less. Nevertheless in the late 20th century Germany built the largest wind power capacity worldwide. Volkmar Lauber explains this achievement in terms of seven advantages inside Germany:

- In terms of politics and public opinion Germany demonstrated the strongest national commitment to renewable energy;
- Superior national governance emphasizing effectiveness;
- Deployment of cost-effective efficiency innovations;
- Administrative efficiency and simplicity;
- Rapid buildup of a domestic equipment industry;
- Emergence of new entrepreneurs more committed to renewable energy than the old established electric companies;
- Outpouring of acceptance and support throughout German society and politics.

== Onshore wind power ==
Since 1995, onshore wind energy has been an important and major industry in Germany. In 1995, the gross production of onshore wind power was 1,530 GWh. By 2019, gross production from onshore wind power was over 101,000 GWh, allowing Germany to power about a fifth of the country from wind. Larger onshore installations are in the works, which could possibly see a larger percentage of wind energy powering Germany. Germany is also notable for having some major wind turbine manufacturers based there, such as Enercon in Aurich, Senvion in Hamburg, and Nordex in Rostock.

== Offshore wind power ==
Offshore wind farms in the German Bight

Offshore wind energy also has great potential in Germany. Wind speed at sea is 70 to 100% higher than onshore and much more constant. As of 2007, a new generation of 5 MW or larger wind turbines which are capable of making full use of the potential of wind power at sea had been developed. This made it possible to operate offshore wind farms in a cost-effective way.

On 15 July 2009, the first offshore German windturbine completed construction. This turbine is the first of a total of 12 wind turbines for the alpha ventus offshore wind farm in the North Sea.

Following the 2011 Japanese nuclear accidents, Germany's federal government began work on a new plan for increasing renewable energy commercialization, with a particular focus on offshore wind farms. Under the plan, large wind turbines were to be erected far away from the coastlines, where the wind blows more consistently than it does on land, and where the enormous turbines won't bother the inhabitants. The plan aimed to decrease Germany's dependence on energy derived from coal and nuclear power plants. The German government wanted to see 7.6 GW installed by 2020 and as much as 26 GW by 2030.

A major challenge was the lack of sufficient network capacities for transmitting the power generated in the North Sea to the large industrial consumers in southern Germany.

In 2014 410 turbines with 1747 megawatts were added to Germany's offshore windparks. Due to not yet finished grid-connections, only turbines with combined 528.9 megawatts were added to the grid feed at the end of 2014. Despite this, the gigawatt offshore windpower barrier was reportedly breached by Germany around the end of 2014 During 2015 offshore windpower was tripled to over 3 gigawatts capacity, signalling the growing importance of this sector.

At the end of 2019, Germany had installed 1,469 offshore wind turbines with a total capacity of 7.52 GW. Capacity in the North Sea reached 6.44 GW, capacity in the Baltic Sea reached 1.08 GW. In total, 25.8 TWh of power were produced in German offshore wind parks in 2019.

The German Federal Government, alongside the state of Lower Saxony and the private sector, pledged €300 million to finance a 38-hectare expansion (Berths 5-7) of the Cuxhaven offshore terminal. Construction officially began in February 2025. This expansion is part of a broader initiative to boost Germany's offshore wind capacity from 8.3 GW to 30 GW by 2030 and 70 GW by 2045, requiring an estimated 200 hectares of additional port area by the end of the 2020s to support new wind farm constructions.

== Government support ==
Since 2011, Germany's federal governments have been working on a new plan for increasing renewable energy commercialization, with a particular focus on offshore wind farms.

In 2016, the Third Merkel cabinet decided to replace feed-in tariffs with auctions from 2017, citing the mature nature of the windpower market being best served in this way. These auctions have resulted in some future offshore wind farms to be operated at market prices and receive no subsidy.

As part of measures to increase wind power installations and usage, the Scholz cabinet adopted a law requiring Germany to set aside 2% of its total land area by 2032 for wind energy use.

=== Energy transition ===
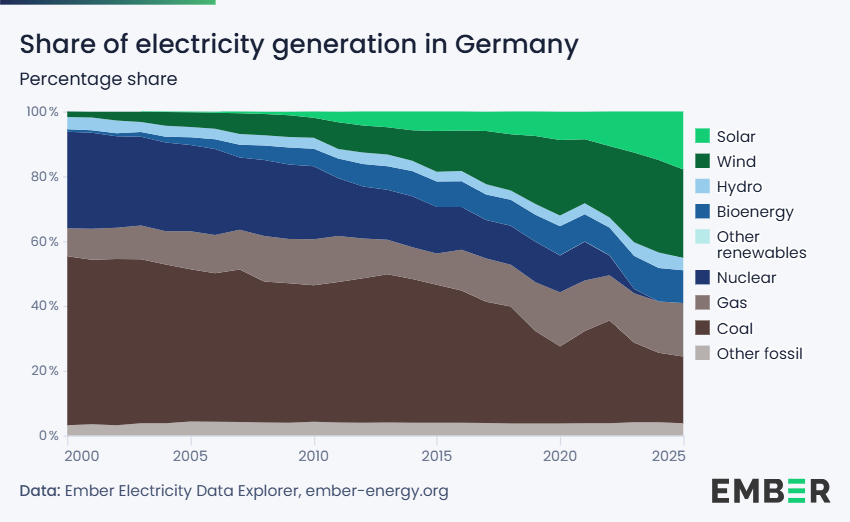
Share of electricity generation in Germany - percentage share

The 2010 "Energiewende" policy has been embraced by the German federal government and has resulted in a huge expansion of renewables, particularly wind power. Germany's share of renewables has increased from around 5% in 1999 to 17% in 2010, reaching close to the OECD average of 18% usage of renewables. Producers were guaranteed a fixed feed-in tariff for 20 years, guaranteeing a fixed income. Energy co-operatives have been created, and efforts were made to decentralize control and profits. The large energy companies had a disproportionately small share of the renewables market. Nuclear power plants were closed starting in 2011 after Fukushima, and 9 reactors closed 2015 — April 2023.

The reduction of reliance on nuclear plants temporarily had the consequence of increased reliance on fossil fuels. 2023 was the first year in which Germany imported more electricity than it exported. One factor that has inhibited efficient employment of new renewable energy has been the lack of an accompanying investment in power infrastructure (SüdLink) to bring the power to market. The transmission constraint sometimes caused Germany to pay Danish wind power to stop producing; in October/November 2015 this amounted to 96 GWh costing 1.8 million euros.

The German states have varying attitudes to the construction of new power lines. Industry has had their rates frozen and so the increased costs of the Energiewende have been passed on to consumers, who have had rising electricity bills. Germans in 2013 had some of the highest electricity costs in Europe.

== Public opinion ==
In Germany, hundreds of thousands of people have invested in citizens' wind farms across the country and thousands of small and medium-sized enterprises are running successful businesses in a new sector that in 2015 employed 142,900 people and generated 12.3 percent of Germany's electricity in 2016.

However, more recently, there has been increasing local resistance to the expansion of wind power in Germany, due to its impact on the landscape, incidents where patches of forest were removed to build wind turbines, the emission of low frequency noise, and the negative impact on wildlife, such as birds of prey and bats. Since 2022, most of the German states have therefore adopted laws that require the financial participation of municipalities and, in some cases, residents in profits generated through local wind power plants.

== Repowering ==
Repowering, the replacement of first-generation wind turbines with modern multi-megawatt machines, is occurring in Germany. Modern turbines make better use of available wind energy and so more wind power can come from the same area of land. Modern turbines also offer much better grid integration since they use a connection method similar to conventional power plants.

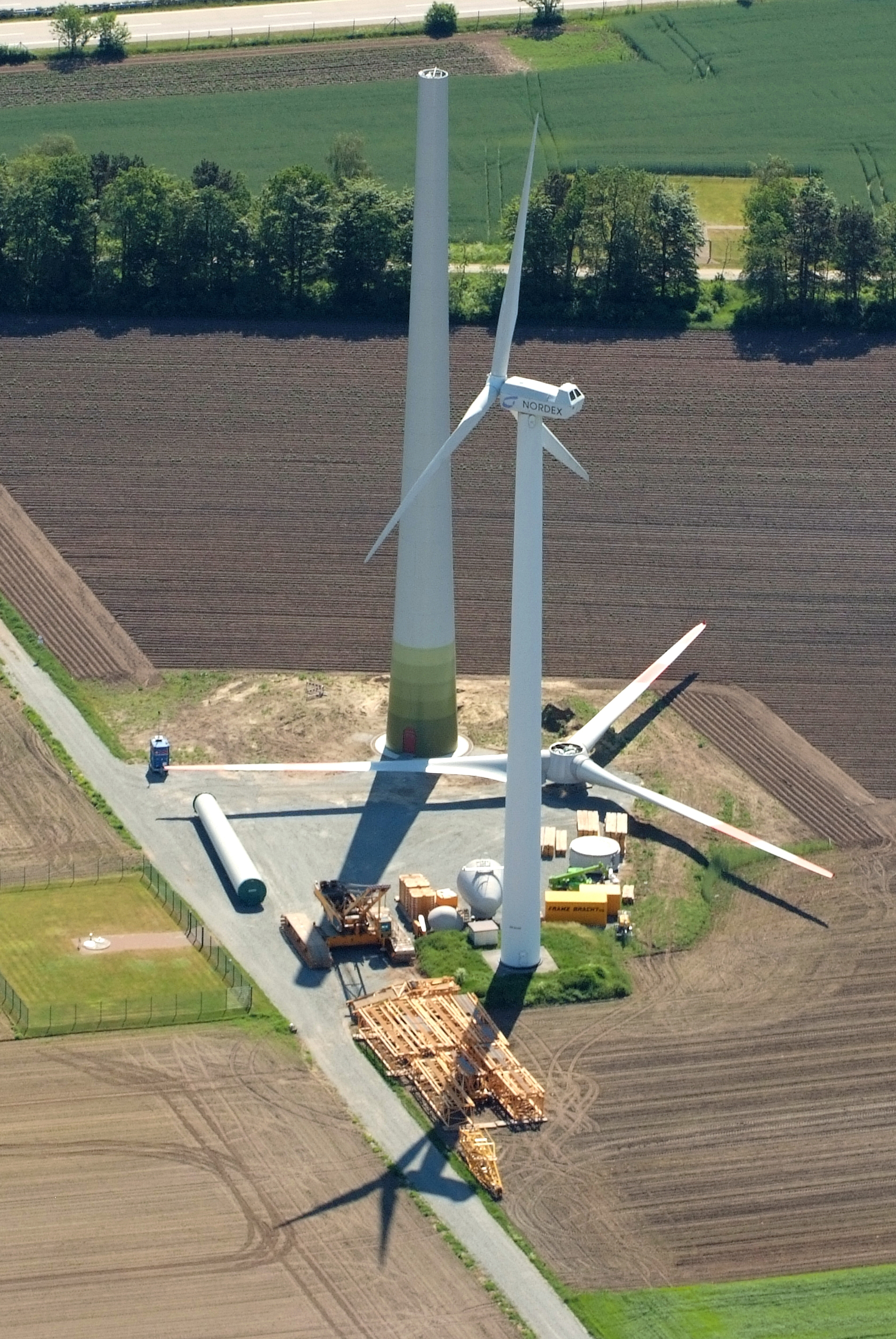

== Statistics ==
Installed wind power capacity and generation in recent years is shown in the tables below:

=== Total ===
Total installed capacity and generation in Germany (land- and sea-based combined)
Year	1990	1991	1992	1993	1994	1995	1996	1997	1998	1999
Installed capacity (MW)	55	106	174	326	618	1,121	1,549	2,089	2,877	4,435
Net generation (GW·h)	71	100	275	600	909	1,500	2,032	2,966	4,489	5,528
Capacity factor	14.74%	10.77%	17.99%	21.01%	16.79%	15.28%	14.93%	16.21%	17.81%	14.23%
Year	2000	2001	2002	2003	2004	2005	2006	2007	2008	2009
Installed capacity (MW)	6,097	8,738	11,976	14,381	16,419	18,248	20,474	22,116	22,794	25,732
Net generation (GW·h)	9,513	10,509	15,786	18,713	25,509	27,229	30,710	39,713	40,574	38,648
Capacity factor	17.76%	13.73%	15.05%	14.85%	17.69%	17.03%	17.12%	20.50%	20.26%	17.15%
Year	2010	2011	2012	2013	2014	2015	2016	2017	2018	2019
Installed capacity (MW)	26,903	28,712	30,979	33,477	38,614	44,541	49,534	55,550	59,420	61,357
Net generation (GW·h)	37,793	48,882	50,671	51,708	57,357	79,084	78,416	103,707	107,889	123,545
Capacity factor	16.04%	19.43%	18.62%	17.63%	16.96%	20.27%	18.02%	21.31%	20.73%	22.99%
Year	2020	2021	2022	2023	2024	2025				
Installed capacity (MW)	62,708	63,865	66,204	69,444	72,750	77,878				
Net generation (GW·h)	129,644	111,734	121,957	139,099	137,198	131,189				
Capacity factor	23.54%	19.97%	21.03%	23.98%	21.47%	19.23%				

=== Offshore only ===
Total installed capacity and generation (sea-based only)
Year	2009	2010	2011	2012	2013	2014	2015	2016	2017	2018
Installed capacity (MW)	30	80	188	268	508	994	3,283	4,152	5,406	6,393
Generation (GW·h)	38	174	568	722	905	1,449	8,162	12,092	17,414	19,179
% of wind gen.	0.1	0.5	1.2	1.4	1.8	2.6	10.5	16.0	16.8	14.99
Capacity factor	12.39%	24.83%	34.49%	30.67%	20.34%	16.64%	28.38%	33.15%	36.77%	34.25%
Year	2019	2020	2021	2022	2023	2024	2025			
Installed capacity (MW)	7,555	7,774	7,774	8,216	8,473	9,215	9,733			
Generation (GW·h)	24,379	26,903	24,014	24,752	23,534	25,679	26,067			
% of wind gen.	19.2	20	21.1	20.3	16.9	18.7	19.9			
Capacity factor	36.84%	39.40%	35.26%	34.39%	31.71%	31.72%	30.57%			

=== By state ===
Installed capacity and wind share of annual electricity consumption by state end 2025
State	No. turbines	Installed capacity [MW]	Watts per square km
Lower Saxony	6,239	13,977	293
Schleswig-Holstein	3,313	9,644	610
Brandenburg	4,135	9,555	322
North Rhine-Westphalia	3,853	9,095	267
Saxony-Anhalt	2,747	5,790	283
Rhineland-Palatinate	1,790	4,328	218
Mecklenburg-Vorpommern	1,826	3,925	168
Hesse	1,201	2,799	133
Bavaria	1,169	2,759	39
Baden-Württemberg	823	2,071	58
Thuringia	861	1,902	117
Saxony	863	1,431	78
Saarland	218	565	220
Bremen	85	199	475
Hamburg	61	122	161
Berlin	6	17	19
Onshore total	29,190	68,177	191
Offshore North Sea	1,371	7,910	
Offshore Baltic Sea	309	1,831	
Offshore total	1,680	9,740	
Germany total	30,870	77,917	

== See also ==
- Renewable energy in Germany
- Solar power in Germany
- Geothermal power in Germany
- Wind power in the European Union
- Renewable energy by country
