= Ruth Putnam =

Ruth Putnam may refer to:

- Ruth Anna Putnam (1927–2019), American philosopher
- Ruth Putnam (author) (1856–1931), author and early graduate of Sage Hall at Cornell University
- Ruth Putnam, daughter of Ann Putnam in The Crucible, a play by Arthur Miller
