= Central Vermont Public Service =

American electricy utility company

Central Vermont Public Service Corp
- Company type: Public
- Traded as: NYSE: CV
- Industry: Utilities
- Founded: 1929
- Defunct: 2012
- Fate: Acquired by Gaz Métro; folded into Green Mountain Power
- Headquarters: 77 Grove Street, Rutland, Vermont, United States
- Area served: Vermont
- Services: electric utilities

Central Vermont Public Service Corp. (CVPS) was the largest electricity supplier in Vermont. Its customer base covered 160,000 people in 163 towns, villages and cities in Vermont. The company generated revenue mainly though purchased electricity through its subsidiaries including C.V. Realty, Inc., East Barnet Hydroelectric, Inc., and Catamount Resources Corp.

== History ==
In 1929, the company was founded by combining eight Vermont electric companies. The creator was Samuel Insull. The company was among the first companies to successfully use wind to generate electricity and organized Yankee Atomic Electric Company to make a trial in atomic power.

In 1990s and 2000s, CVPS struggled to maintain profitability and was acquired by Quebec's Gaz Métro on June 27, 2012, merging into its Green Mountain Power subsidiary through Gaz Métro's American operations, Northern New England Energy Corporation. Gaz Métro purchased CVPS for $472 million, outbidding another Canadian company who sought CVPS, Fortis Inc.
