= Palmer Cosslett Putnam =

Wind power pioneer (1900-1984)

Palmer Cosslett Putnam (1900–1984) was an American consulting engineer and wind-power pioneer, the son of George Haven Putnam and Emily (Smith) Putnam (1865–1944). Putnam graduated from MIT in 1924 as a geologist after serving in the RAF during World War I. He is known as the designer of the Smith–Putnam wind turbine installed in 1941 in Vermont, the first megawatt-scale wind turbine project. Putnam wrote on the subject of wind power including "Power from the Wind" published in 1948, with an introduction by Vannevar Bush, describing the Smith–Putnam project. His book "Energy in the Future", 1953, was reviewed in the journal "Science".

Putnam served as the president of G. P. Putnam's Sons publishing company from the time of his father's death until 1932. During the Second World War he worked on military projects including the DUKW amphibious vehicle.

== Publications ==
- 1948: Power from the Wind (Van Nostrand)
- 1953: Energy in the Future (Van Nostrand)
