= Salem Witch Trials (film) =

- Screenplay by: Maria Nation
- Directed by: Joseph Sargent
- Starring: Kirstie Alley; Alan Bates
- Theme music composer: Jonathan Goldsmith
- Countries of origin: United States; Canada
- Original language: English

Production
- Producer: John Ryan
- Cinematography: Pierre Gill
- Editor: Debra Karen
- Running time: 189 minutes

Original release
- Network: CBS
- Release: March 2, 2003

Salem Witch Trials is a 2003 American-Canadian historical drama miniseries directed by Joseph Sargent and starring Kirstie Alley and Alan Bates. It is a dramatization of the Salem witch trials.

== Cast ==
- Kirstie Alley as Ann Putnam
- Henry Czerny as Samuel Parris
- Gloria Reuben as Tituba Indian
- Jay O. Sanders as Thomas Putnam
- Kristin Booth as Lizzy Porter
- Katie Boland as Annie Putnam
- Alan Bates as William Phips
- Rebecca De Mornay as Elizabeth Parris
- Peter Ustinov as William Stoughton
- Shirley MacLaine as Rebecca Nurse
- Zachary Bennett as Joseph Putnam

== Production ==
The series was shot in Toronto and Cornwall, Ontario.

== Release ==
The series debuted on DVD and Blu-ray on September 30, 2008 via Echo Bridge Entertainment. Neither version contains any extras.
