= Putnam family =

Family

- Earlier spellings: Puttenham, Putenham
- Origin: England
- Traditions: Puritan

Coat of Arms of John Putnam

The Putnam family of prominent old colonial Americans was founded by Puritans John and Priscilla (Gould) Putnam in the 17th century, in Salem, Massachusetts. Many notable individuals are descendants of this family, including those listed below.

John Putnam was born about 1585 and came from Aston Abbotts, Buckinghamshire, England. He was married to Priscilla Gould and they settled in Salem. They were the parents of seven children: Elizabeth, Thomas, John, Nathaniel, Sara, Phoebe, and John. Their eldest son, Thomas, was the father of Thomas Putnam and Deacon Edward Putnam, who were involved in the Salem witch trials and were partially responsible for the executions of those convicted of witchcraft.

== Notable members ==
- Albigence Waldo Putnam (1799–1869), historian
- Ann Putnam, Jr. (1679–1716), accuser at Salem Witchcraft trials
- Ann Putnam Senior (1661–1699), witness in the Salem Witch Trials
- Brenda Putnam (1890–1975), sculptor
- Benjamin Alexander Putnam (1801–1869)
- Carleton Putnam (1901–1998), aviator, activist & author
- David Putnam (1898–1918), World War I air ace
- Frederic Ward Putnam (1839–1915), American anthropologist, Harvard University
- George Putnam (1807–1878), Unitarian minister
- George Putnam (1889–1960), great-great-grandson of Judge Samuel Putnam, founder of Putnam Investments; his son George Putnam, retired chairman Putnam Investments; and grandson George Putnam III, Chairman, Putnam Investments
- George D. Putnam (born 1948), screenwriter
- George Haven Putnam (1844–1930), book entrepreneur & publishing-family member
- George Palmer Putnam (1814–1872), book entrepreneur
- George P. Putnam (1887–1950), publisher, author, explorer, & publishing-family member; husband of aviator Amelia Earhart
- Gideon Putnam (1763–1812), entrepreneur
- Harriet Putnam Fowler (1842–1901), author & poet
- Harold Putnam (1916–2007), politician, attorney, journalist, and artist
- Herbert Putnam (1861–1955), American library administrator & publishing-family member
- Israel Putnam (1718–1790), American Revolution General
- Jake Putnam (born 1956), Emmy award winning journalist, author, US Osuna Cup Team, Senior Olympic tennis player
- James Jackson Putnam (1846–1918), neurologist
- Mary Corinna Putnam Jacobi (1842–1906), American physician
- Michael C. J. Putnam (1933–2025), American classicist, Virgil scholar, former sole trustee of the Lowell observatory
- Palmer Cosslett Putnam (1900–1984), Wind power pioneer and author, builder of the Smith–Putnam wind turbine
- Paul A. Putnam (1903–1982), American Brigadier General United States Marine Corps, Commander during the defense of wake Island during World War II
- Samuel Putnam (1768–1853), Massachusetts Supreme Court justice, who wrote the opinion in Harvard College v. Amory, which established the Prudent man rule in US Law
- Robert Putnam (born 1941), American political scientist, Harvard University
- Rufus Putnam (1738–1824), American Revolution officer, later brigadier general
- Seth Putnam (1968–2011), American musician, from Newton, Massachusetts
- Thomas Putnam (1651–1699), landowner in Salem during the Salem witch trials
- William Lowell Putnam (1861–1923), American jurist & banker
- George Putnam (newsman) (1914–2008), Emmy award winning investigative journalist & news broadcaster

== Family tree ==
Putnam family members
- John Putnam (c. 1580–1666) m. Priscilla Gould
  - Thomas Putnam (1614–1686)
    - Thomas Putnam (1652–1699), Salem witch trials accuser
      - Ann Putnam, Jr. (1679–1716), Salem witch trials accuser
    - Deacon Edward Putnam (1654–1747), Salem witch trials accuser
      - Edward Putnam (1682–1755)
        - Edward Putnam (1711–1800)
          - David Putnam (1752–1840)
            - David Putnam Jr. (1790–1879)
              - Alonzo W. Putnam (1828–1881)
                - Hiram M. Putnam (1856–1935)
                  - George F. Putnam (1891–1946)
                    - George Putnam (newsman) (1914–2008)
      - Elisha Putnam (1685–1745)
        - Rufus Putnam (1738–1824), General
    - Joseph Putnam (1669–1722) m. Elizabeth Porter (1673–1746)
      - David Putnam (1707–1768)
        - Israel Putnam (born 1742)
          - Daniel Putnam
            - Benjamin Putnam
              - Frederick Putnam
                - David Putnam
                  - David Putnam (1898–1918), World War I ace
        - William Putnam (born 1749)
          - Andrew Putnam
            - George Putnam
              - George Putnam
                - William Lowell Putnam (1861–1923), lawyer and banker
      - Israel Putnam (1718–1790), General
        - Daniel Putnam (1759–1831), Colonel
          - William Putnam (1783–1846)
            - William Hutchinson Putnam (1812–1889), legislator and physician
              - John Day Putnam (1837–1904), legislator and mayor
              - Albert Day Putnam (1852–1905), legislator and banker
  - Nathaniel Putnam (1619–1700)
    - Benjamin Putnam (1664–1715) m. Sarah Tarrant
      - Nathaniel Putnam (1686–1754)
        - Archelaus Putnam Sr. (born 1718)
          - Nathaniel Putnam (1746–1800)
            - Nathaniel Putnam (1774–1849)
              - Nathaniel Putnam (1802–1886)
                - Abby Putnam Morrison (1848–)
                  - Lillian Morrison Tingue (1885–)
                    - Grace Tingue Curran (1907–1988)
          - Dr. Archelaus Putnam Jr. (1744-1800), medical officer during Revolutionary War
            - Caleb Putnam (1763–1826)
              - James Russell Putnam (1781–1841)
                - James Mercier Putnam (1823–1887), instrumental in colonizing British Honduras
                  - James Henry Putnam (born 1848), sugar plantation and railroad owner
                    - Robert Emmet Putnam (1883–1959)
                      - Richard Johnson Putnam (1913–2002), federal judge
                      - "Bobby" Emmet Putnam (1919–2009)
                        - Dr. Kimball Putnam Marshall, Ph.D. (born 1947), nationally recognized professor of business
                          - Annah Kimball Marshall, B.A., M.S.W. (born 1981), Licensed Independent Social Worker
                          - Elizabeth Marie Marshall, B.A. (born 1983), Independent Real Estate Agent
      - Tarrant Putnam (1688–1732)
        - Gideon Putnam (1726–1811)
          - Samuel Putnam (1768–1853), Massachusetts Supreme Court justice
      - Daniel Putnam (born 1696)
        - Daniel Putnam
          - Henry Putnam
            - Henry Putnam
              - George Palmer Putnam (1814–1872), book publisher m. Victorine Haven
                - Mary Corinna Putnam Jacobi (1842–1906), physician m. Abraham Jacobi (1830–1919), physician
                - George Haven Putnam (1844–1930), book publisher
                  - Bertha Putnam (1872–1960), historian
                  - George P. Putnam (1887–1950), writer, explorer m. Amelia Earhart (1897–1937), aviator
                  - Palmer Cosslett Putnam (1900–1984), engineer
                - John Bishop Putnam (1849–1915), book publisher
                - Irving Putnam, book publisher
                  - Edmund Whitman Putnam (1882–1941), book publisher, physician m. Ethel Wilson
                - Herbert Putnam (1861–1955), 8th Librarian of Congress
                  - Brenda Putnam (1890–1975), sculptor
  - John Putnam (1627–1710)
    - James Putnam Sr. (1661–1727), bricklayer
      - James Putnam Jr. (born 1689), bricklayer
        - Ebenezer Putnam
          - Ebenezer Putnam II
            - Ebenezer Putnam III
              - Frederic Ward Putnam (1839–1915), naturalist
                - Eben Putnam (1868–1933), historian and genealogist
