= John McLean (merchant) =

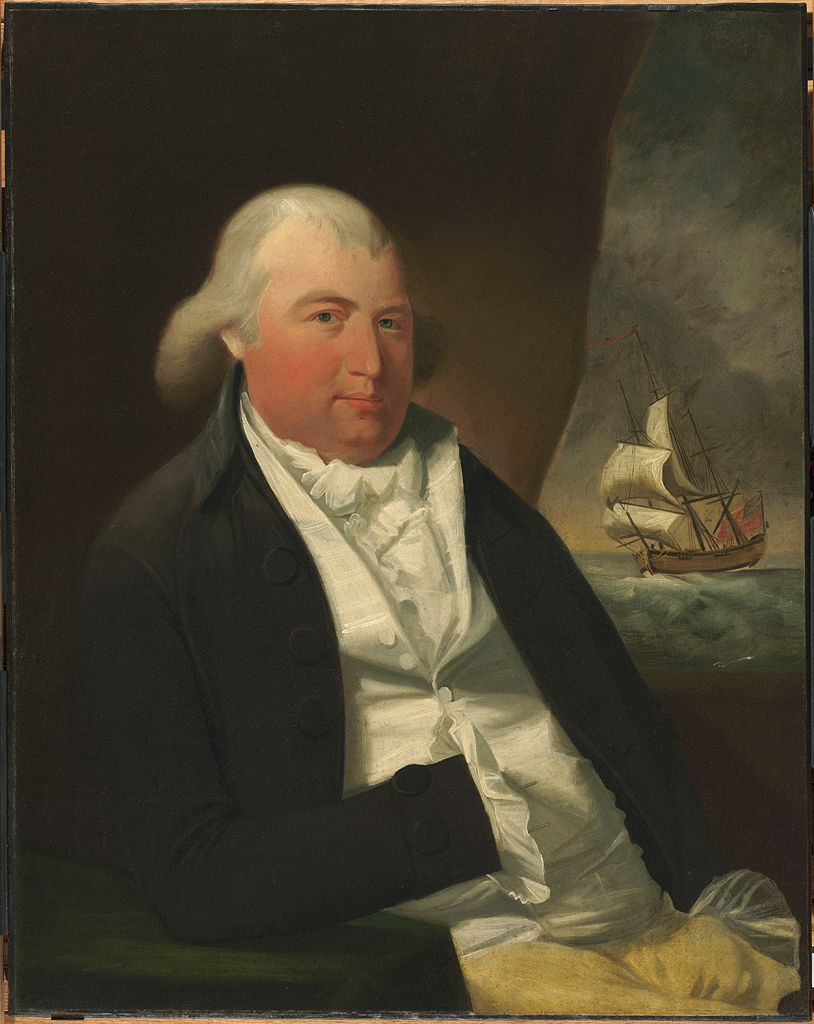
- Portrait by John Johnston
- Born: 1761; Milton, Massachusetts
- Died: October 23, 1823 (aged 62 or 63); Boston, Massachusetts
- Spouse: Ann Amory McLean Lee (m. 1796-1823, his death)

John McLean (1761 – October 16, 1823) was an American merchant most famous because of his will. The will was the subject of the Massachusetts Supreme Judicial Court case Harvard College v. Amory, which led to the Prudent man rule; left a bequest to Massachusetts General Hospital which led to McLean Hospital being named after him; and established the McLean Professor of Ancient and Modern History, a professorship at Harvard University.

== Biography ==
John McLean was born in 1761. The exact date is unknown. His birthplace was likely Milton, Massachusetts where his mother's parents had settled. However, the Milton record of births does not list John McLean's birth in the town. John McLean, an only child, attended the Milton public schools. On October 15, 1795 he bought a house for $8,000 on the Franklin Street Crescent that had been designed by Charles Bulfinch. On February 14, 1796, at King's Chapel, Boston, he married Ann Amory, one of the eleven children of John Amory.

McLean was a merchant, who partnered with Isaac Davenport. He worked from offices on Long Wharf while ingraining himself in Boston society, becoming a member of the Massachusetts (Boston) Chapter of the Masonic Society, and one of the original shareholders of the Manufacturers' and Mechanics' Bank in 1814 and the City Bank of Boston in 1822. It appears that McLean led a boom and bust merchant's life, his fortunes hitting a low at the end of the eighteenth century. Between December 1799 and January 1800, eight ships whose insurance was in part underwritten by him were taken by French privateers. Some accounts state that McLean went bankrupt; others that he almost went bankrupt, but was saved financially by the arrival of a ship thought lost. McLean continued his business interests and it is said that he made $100,000 in a single speculation on molasses at the time of the War of 1812.

In 1823, the year of his death, John McLean placed mile markers six through ten out from Boston to his birthplace, Milton, Massachusetts. His business partner, Isaac Davenport, completed the work after McLean's death and had McLean's name inscribed on the stones. As of 2016, the stones still exist. John McLean died a wealthy and well-regarded man on October 23, 1823, leaving an estate of $228,120. His reputation at his death had matured to the point that it was said after his death, "Mr. McLean was a truly noble specimen of a Boston Merchant."

== Legacy ==
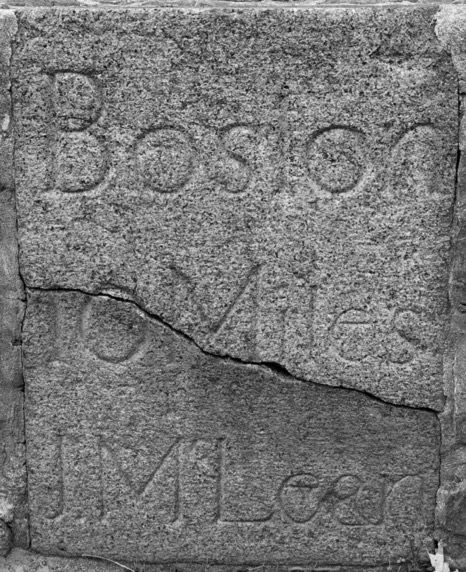
Mile marker placed by McLean

McLean's will contained an important flaw when it was originally written. The will dated August 13, 1821 was drafted and was witnessed by Lemuel Shaw. It did not contain a residuary clause to dispose of the rest of the estate after the specific bequests. This oversight was corrected in a codicil dated September 18, 1822, one year before McLean’s death, leaving everything not specifically disposed of to the Massachusetts General Hospital. The will is transcribed in its entirely at Bator, Thomas E. and Seely, Heidi A., The Boston Trustee: The Lives, Laws & Legacy of a Vital Institution 21 (2015). The Trust established for his wife, Ann, and Massachusetts General Hospital and Harvard College was subject to two Massachusetts Supreme Judicial Court cases, including the famous Harvard College v. Amory Case.

The history of the Massachusetts General Hospital states that the residuary gift by McLean proved to be over $90,000. The bequest and residue from McLean was by far the largest amount that was given to the Hospital prior to 1851; it is listed in the Hospital’s records as being valued at $119,858.20. The Massachusetts General Hospital Board of Trustees gave Ann McLean a bed at the Hospital free for life. Next, the Hospital Board commissioned Gilbert Stuart to paint a portrait of McLean (A second portrait was commissioned for Ann McLean which is now owned by Harvard University). Finally, the Hospital considered renaming the Hospital in McLean’s name. In the end, McLean’s name was given to the Massachusetts General Hospital insane asylum, now known as McLean Hospital. Ironically, the Asylum’s administrative building was housed in a house designed by the same Charles Bulfinch who had designed the Franklin Crescent house that McLean bought in 1795. Nathaniel I. Bowditch, the son of Nathaniel Bowditch and historian of the Hospital, reported: “On the other hand the corporate name remained unchanged, many sons and daughters of Massachusetts have since contributed to it as a State institution, what perhaps they would have hesitated to bestow, if it had born the name of a private founder.”

John McLean, his wife Ann, his parents, Hugh and Agnes McLean, and her brother/trustee, Francis, are buried in a tomb at the Milton Cemetery in Milton, Massachusetts. The tomb was deconstructed by the cemetery for safety reasons and the graves are now marked by the lintel which reads "F. Amory, A.D. 1842" and the original tombstone: THE TOMB OF JOHN MCLEAN HUGH McLEAN, died December, 1799, aged 75 years. AGNES McLEAN, died March, 1821, aged 82 years. JOHN McLEAN, died October 16, 1823, aged 62 years. SARAH AMORY, wife of Francis Amory, died October 8, 1828, aged 49 years. ANN LEE, widow of John McLean and wife of WILLIAM LEE, died September 11, 1834, aged 60 years. FRANCIS AMORY, died July 6, 1845, Aged 79.
