= Re Lucking's Will Trusts =

- Court: High Court
- Citation: [1968] 1 WLR 866, [1967] 3 All ER 726

Case opinions
- Cross J

Keywords
- Duty of care, corporate governance, breach of trust

Re Lucking's Will Trusts [1968] 1 WLR 866 is an English trusts law case concerning the duty of care of a trustee, and the requirement to become involved in the governance of companies in which the trust has an interest.

== Facts ==
Two trustees, L and B held 70 per cent of shares in a shoe accessory company, with 20 factory employees, 2 travellers and an agency in France. 29 per cent belonged to L and 1% to his wife. The company directors were Mr and Mrs L, as well as D who managed the business. D wrongfully took £15,000 from the bank account and later went bankrupt, losing the money. The beneficiaries of the trust sued the trustees for breach of their duty of care.

== Judgment ==
Cross J held that the trustees had breached their duty of care, and that they should have become involved in the company's management to prevent the misappropriation of the company's assets taking place. He continued as follows.

The conduct of the defendant trustees is, I think, to be judged by the standard applied in Speight v Gaunt, namely, that a trustee is only bound to conduct the business of the trust in such a way as an ordinary prudent man would conduct a business of his own. Now what steps, if any, does a reasonably prudent man who finds himself a majority shareholder in a private company take with regard to the management of the company's affairs? He does not, I think, content himself with such information as to the management of the company's affairs as he is entitled to as shareholder, but ensures that he is represented on the board. He may be prepared to run the business himself as managing director or, at least, to become a non-executive director while having the business managed by someone else. Alternatively, he may find someone who will act as his nominee on the board and report to him from time to time as to the company's affairs. In the same way, as it seems to me, trustees holding a controlling interest ought to ensure so far as they can that they have such information as to the progress of the company's affairs as directors would have. If they sit back and allow the company to be run by the minority shareholder and receive no more information than shareholders are entitled to, they do so at their risk if things go wrong.

== Significance ==
In Bartlett v Barclays Bank Trust Co Ltd, Brightman J interpreted the case as follows.

I do not understand Cross J. to have been saying that in every case where trustees have a controlling interest in a company it is their duty to ensure that one of their number is a director or that they have a nominee on the board who will report from time to time on the affairs of the company. He was merely outlining convenient methods by which a prudent man of business (as also a trustee) with a controlling interest in a private company, can place himself in a position to make an informed decision whether any action is appropriate to be taken for the protection of his asset. Other methods may be equally satisfactory and convenient, depending upon the circumstances of the individual case. Alternatives which spring to mind are the receipt of copies of the agenda and minutes of board meetings if regularly held, the receipt of monthly management accounts in the case of a trading concern, or quarterly reports. Every case will depend on its own facts. The possibilities are endless. It would be useless, indeed misleading, to seek to lay down a general rule. The purpose to be achieved is not that of monitoring every move of the directors, but of making it reasonably probable, so far as circumstances permit, that the trustee or (as in the Lucking case) one of them will receive an adequate flow of information in time to enable the trustees to make use of their controlling interest should this be necessary for the protection of their trust asset, namely, the shareholding. The obtaining of information is not an end in itself, but merely a means of enabling the trustees to safeguard the interests of their beneficiaries.

== See also ==
- English trusts law
