= William Brett, 1st Viscount Esher =

British lawyer, judge and politician (1815–1899)

The Right Honourable The Viscount Esher PC
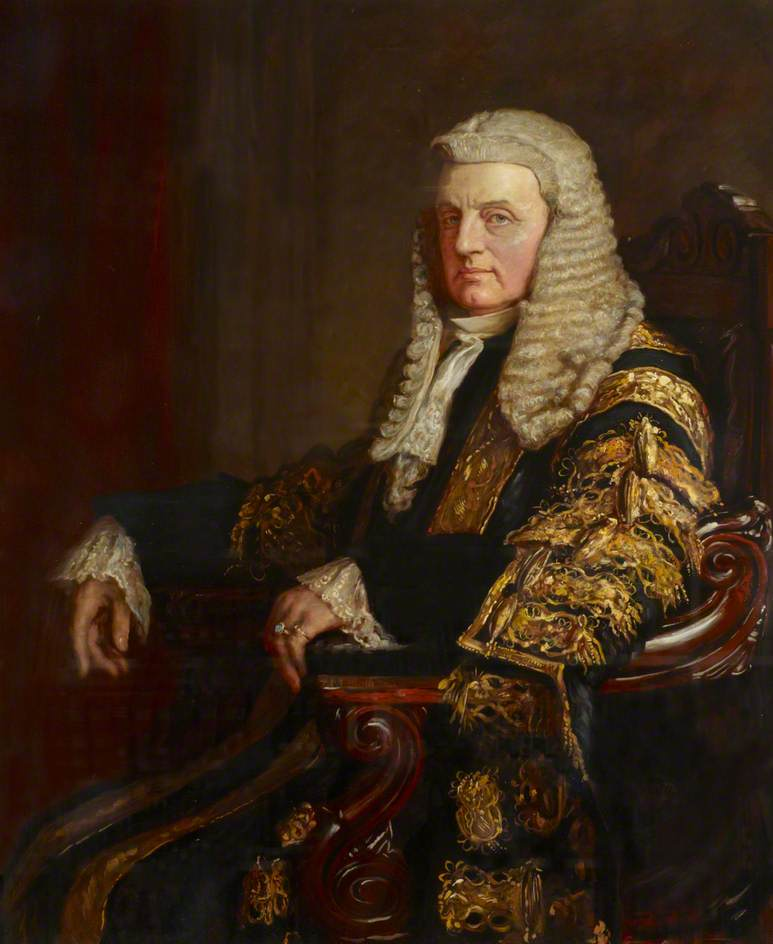
- Lord Esher by John Everett Millais.

Solicitor General for England and Wales
- In office 10 February 1868 – 16 September 1868
- Monarch: Victoria
- Prime Minister: Benjamin Disraeli
- Preceded by: Sir Charles Jasper Selwyn
- Succeeded by: Sir Richard Baggallay

Master of the Rolls
- In office April 1883 – 1897
- Monarch: Victoria
- Preceded by: Sir George Jessel
- Succeeded by: Sir Nathaniel Lindley

Personal details
- Born: 13 August 1815
- Died: 24 May 1899 (aged 83) London, England
- Party: Conservative
- Spouse: Eugénie Mayer
- Children: 3, including Reginald
- Education: King's College London; Caius College, Cambridge

William Baliol Brett, 1st Viscount Esher, PC (13 August 1815 – 24 May 1899), known as Sir William Brett between 1868 and 1883, was a British lawyer, judge, and Conservative politician. He was briefly Solicitor General under Benjamin Disraeli and then served as a justice of the Court of Common Pleas between 1868 and 1876, as a Lord Justice of Appeal between 1876 and 1883 and as Master of the Rolls. He was raised to the peerage as Baron Esher in 1885 and further honoured when he was made Viscount Esher on his retirement in 1897.

== Background and education ==
Brett was a son of the Reverend Joseph George Brett, of Chelsea, London, by Dorothy, daughter of George Best, of Chilston Park, Boughton Malherbe, Kent. He was educated at Westminster School, King's College London and at Gonville and Caius College, Cambridge. Brett rowed for Cambridge University Boat Club against Leander Club in 1837 and 1838, then in the victorious Cambridge crew against Oxford University in the 1839 Boat Race.

== Career ==
Called to the Bar in 1840, Brett went to the northern circuit and became a Queen's Counsel in 1861. On the death of Richard Cobden in 1865, he unsuccessfully contested Rochdale as a Conservative, but in an 1866 by-election, he was returned for Helston in unique circumstances. He and his opponent polled exactly the same number of votes, and the mayor, as returning officer, then gave his casting vote for the Liberal candidate. As the vote was given after four o'clock, however, an appeal was lodged, and the House of Commons allowed both members to take their seats.

Brett rapidly made his mark in the House, and in early 1868, he was knighted and appointed Solicitor General under Benjamin Disraeli. On behalf of the Crown, he prosecuted the Fenians charged with having caused the Clerkenwell Outrage. In Parliament, he took a leading part in the promotion of bills connected with the administration of law and justice. In August 1868, he was appointed a Justice of the Court of Common Pleas. Some of his sentences in this capacity excited much criticism, notably so in the case of the Gas Stokers' Strike, when he sentenced the defendants to imprisonment for twelve months, with hard labour, which was afterwards reduced by the Home Secretary to four months.

On the reconstitution of the Court of Appeal in 1876, Brett was elevated to the rank of a Lord Justice of Appeal. He was sworn of the Privy Council at the same time. After holding the position for seven years, he succeeded Sir George Jessel as Master of the Rolls in 1883. In 1885 he was raised to the peerage as Baron Esher, of Esher in the County of Surrey. He opposed the bill proposing that an accused person or his wife might give evidence in their own case and supported the bill that empowered Lords of Appeal to sit and vote after their retirement. The Solicitors Act 1888, which increased the powers of the Incorporated Law Society, owed much to his influence. In 1880, he delivered a speech in the House of Lords, deprecating the delay and expense of trials, which he regarded as having been increased by the Judicature Act 1873. He retired from the bench at the close of 1897, and was created Viscount Esher, of Esher in the County of Surrey, a dignity rarely given to any judge, Lord Chancellors excepted.

== Judgments ==
- Tamplin v James (1880) 15 Ch D 215 (CA), upholding a decision of Baggallay LJ in the first instance; contract law concerning the availability of specific performance for a breach of contract induced by mistake.
- Compagnie Financiere du Pacifique v Peruvian Guano Co (1882) 11 QBD 55 - Established the modern test for discovery of documents.
- Heaven v Pender (1883) - In the obiter dicta in his judgment of the Court of Appeal, Brett MR sought to establish a general "duty of care" between parties that would have led to a tort of negligence. Such a principle was only finally accepted by English courts in 1932.
- Foakes v Beer (Brett sitting in the Court of Appeal) [1884] UKHL 1, [1881-85] All ER Rep 106, (1884) 9 App Cas 605; 54 LJQB 130; 51 LT 833; 33 WR 233 - a leading case from the House of Lords on the legal concept of consideration
- In the Arbitration between Secretary of State for Home Department and Fletcher (1887) - upholding a Queens bench decision supporting the authority of the Inspector of Mines to require the use of safety lamps; Bowen LJ dissenting.
- Filburn v People's Palace and Aquarium Co Ltd (1890) was a case that imposed strict liability upon owners of wild animals for harm caused by them.
- British South Africa Co v Companhia de Moçambique [1893] AC 602 (Esher sitting in the Court of Appeal) - Esher dissented from the Court of Appeal decision of Fry LJ and Lopes LJ; the House of Lords overturned their decision and by so doing established the Mozambique rule, a common law rule in private international law that renders actions relating to title in foreign land, the right to possession of foreign land, and trespass to foreign land non-justiciable in common law jurisdictions.
- The Satanita [1897] AC 59 - Contract law case atypical of the conventional offer & acceptance pattern seen in English law. Brett's decision at appeal affirmed by the House of Lords.
- Chatenay v Brazilian Submarine Telegraph Company Ltd [1891] QB 79 - choice of law in relation to transactions under foreign powers of attorney

== Family ==
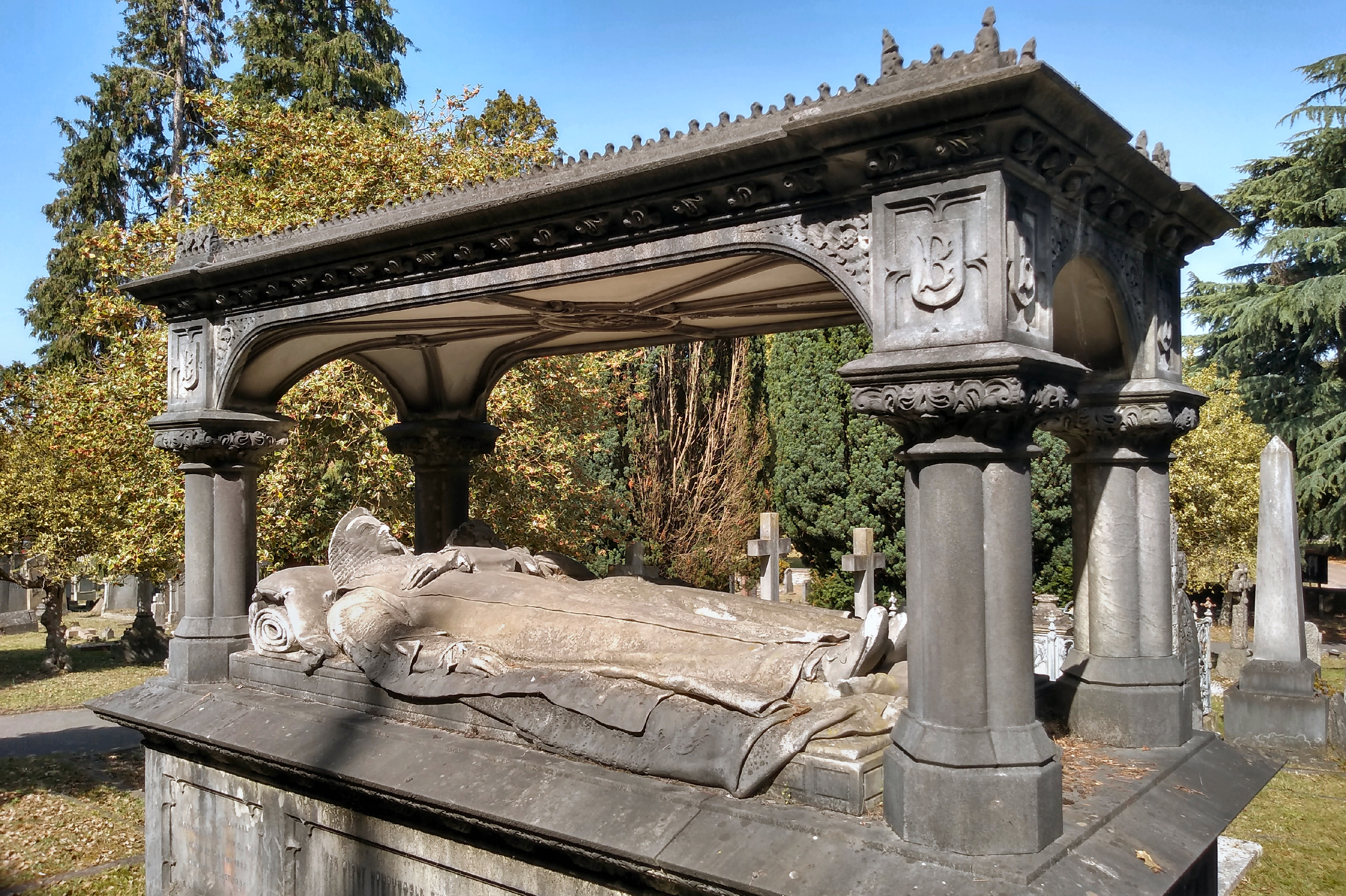
Tomb, Christ Church, Esher

Lord Esher married Eugénie Mayer (1814–1904) in 1850. She was the daughter of Finette and Lazare Mayer, and the step-daughter of Lt Col John Gurwood, the editor of Wellington's Dispatches. They had two sons, Reginald, and Eugène, and a daughter Violet, wife of William Humble Dudley Ward and mother of William Dudley Ward. Lord Esher died in London in May 1899, aged eighty-three, and was succeeded by his eldest son, Reginald.

== Arms ==
Coat of arms of William Brett, 1st Viscount Esher
| Crest A lion passant Gules charged on the shoulder with a cross botonny fitchéee Or and holding in the dexter forepaw a fasces Proper. Escutcheon Quarterly 1st & 4th Gules within an orle of crosses botonny fitchée Or a lion rampant of the last holding in the dexter forepaw a fasces erect Proper 2nd per pale Or and Gules three leopard's faces counterchanged 3rd Azure three bears' heads couped Argent muzzled Gules. Supporters Dexter a boar sinister a lion both Sable and each charged on the shoulder with a cross botonny fitchée Or and holding between the paws a fasces erect Proper. Motto Vicimus |

== See also ==
- List of Cambridge University Boat Race crews

Parliament of the United Kingdom
| Preceded by Robert Campbell | Member of Parliament for Helston; 1866 – 1868 | Succeeded by Adolphus William Young |
Legal offices
| Preceded by Sir Charles Jasper Selwyn | Solicitor General; February 1868 – September 1868 | Succeeded by Sir Richard Baggallay |
| Preceded by Sir George Jessel | Master of the Rolls; 1883 – 1897 | Succeeded by Sir Nathaniel Lindley |
Peerage of the United Kingdom
| New creation | Viscount Esher; 1897–1899 | Succeeded by Reginald Brett |
| New creation | Baron Esher; 1885–1899 | Succeeded by Reginald Brett |
