= Bartlett v Barclays Bank Trust Co Ltd =

Trusts law case

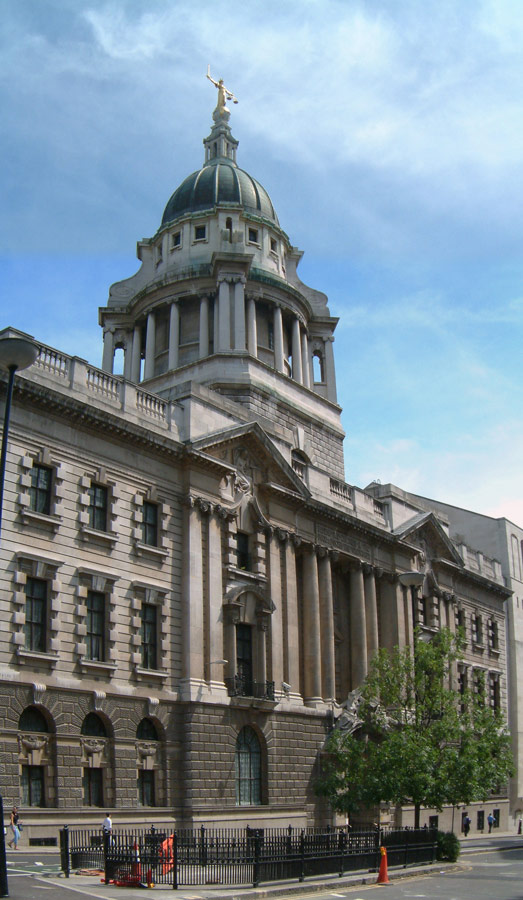
- Court: Court of Appeal
- Decided: 31 July 1979
- Citation: [1980] Ch 515; [1980] 2 WLR 430

Court membership
- Judge sitting: Brightman J

Bartlett v Barclays Bank Trust Co Ltd (No. 2) [1980] 1 Ch 515 in an English trusts law case. In it Brightman J gave a comprehensive discussion of the duties of trustees in connection with companies whose shares are part of the trust property. Although it is common to hear lawyers refer to "the rule in Bartlett v Barclays Bank", the case only restated law that had been accepted since Speight v Gaunt.

== Facts ==
Barclays Bank was the sole trustee of the Bartlett trust, set up by Sir Herbert Bartlett. The sole asset of the trust was 99.8% of the issued shares in the family company. On the company board were two surveyors, an accountant and a solicitor. The trustee appointed none. In an attempt to raise cash, the trust appointed merchant bankers to consider taking the company public. The bankers advised that a public offering would be much more successful if the company expanded its business from managing property to developing property as well. Barclays Bank as trustee agreed to this policy (so long as the income available to the beneficiaries was not affected). The board then embarked on speculative developments, one of which ended in disaster when planning permission could not be obtained for a large development (the Old Bailey project), and the trust suffered a significant loss.

== Judgment ==
Brightman J held that the bank, as trustee, had not discharged its duty as trustee in failing to supervise the new ventures of the company. He held that, given the size of the shareholding, the bank should have obtained the fullest information on the conduct of the business, and it was not sufficient to rely merely on the supply of information that they received in the ordinary course as a shareholder. Their defence, that they honestly and reasonably believed the board of directors to be competent and capable of running the business, was rejected. The court reiterated older propositions as to the duty of trustees, "to conduct the business of the trust with the same care as an ordinary prudent man of business would extend to his own affairs." However, the implication was that where a prudent man of business holds the majority of shares in a company, he would actively engage himself in the company's undertakings rather than leaving it to the board. Brightman J distanced the court from suggestions made in Re Lucking's Will Trusts [1968] 1 WLR 866 (at 874) that a controlling shareholder should insist upon being represented on the board, although he agreed that this would be one way in which the trustee could ensure that all of the necessary information was available to him.

The situation may be summed up as follows. Bartlett Trust (Holdings) Ltd. (BTH) made a large loss as a result of the involvement of itself and BTL in the Old Bailey project. This loss reduced the value of the BTH shares and thereby caused a loss to the trust fund of the 1920 settlement. The bank, had it acted in time, could by reason of its shareholding have stopped the board of BTL embarking upon the Old Bailey project; and, had it acted in time, could have stopped the board of BTL and later the board of BTH (it is unnecessary to differentiate) from continuing with the project; and could, had it acted in time, have required BTH to sell its interest in Far Investments Ltd. (Far) to Stock Conversion on the no-loss or small-loss terms which (as I find) were available for the asking. This would not have necessitated the draconian course of threatening to remove, or actually removing, the board in favour of compliant directors. The members of the board were reasonable persons, and would (as I find) have followed any reasonable policy desired by the bank had the bank's wishes been indicated to the board. The loss to the trust fund could have been avoided (as I find) without difficulty or disruption had the bank been prepared to lead, in a broad sense, rather than to follow.

What, then, was the duty of the bank and did the bank fail in its duty? It does not follow that because a trustee could have prevented a loss it is therefore liable for the loss. The questions which I must ask myself are (1) What was the duty of the bank as the holder of 99.8 per cent. of the shares in BTL and BTH? (2) Was the bank in breach of duty in any and if so what respect? (3) If so, did that breach of duty cause the loss which was suffered by the trust estate? (4) If so, to what extent is the bank liable to make good that loss? In approaching these questions, I bear in mind that the attack on the bank is based, not on wrongful acts, but on wrongful omissions, that is to say, non-feasance not misfeasance.

The cases establish that it is the duty of a trustee to conduct the business of the trust with the same care as an ordinary prudent man of business would extend towards his own affairs: In re Speight (1883) 22 Ch.D. 727, per Sir George Jessel M.R. at p. 739 and Bowen L.J. at p. 762; affirmed on appeal, Speight v Gaunt (1883) 9 App.Cas. 1, and see Lord Blackburn at p. 19. In applying this principle, Lindley L.J. (who was the third member of the court in the Speight case) added in In re Whiteley (1886) 33 Ch.D. 347, 355:

“… care must be taken not to lose sight of the fact that the business of the trustee, and the business which the ordinary prudent man is supposed to be conducting for himself, is the business of investing money for the benefit of persons who are to enjoy it at some future time, and not for the sole benefit of the person entitled to the present income. The duty of a trustee is not to take such care only as a prudent man would take if he had only himself to consider; the duty rather is to take such care as an ordinary prudent man would take if he were minded to make an investment for the benefit of other people for whom he felt morally bound to provide. That is the kind of business the ordinary prudent man is supposed to be engaged in; and unless this is borne in mind the standard of a trustee's duty will be fixed too low; lower than it has ever yet been fixed, and lower certainly than the House of Lords or this Court endeavoured to fix it in Speight v Gaunt.”

See on appeal Learoyd v Whiteley (1887) 12 App.Cas. 727, where Lord Watson added, at p. 733:

“Business men of ordinary prudence may, and frequently do, select investments which are more or less of a speculative character; but it is the duty of a trustee to confine himself to the class of investments which are permitted by the trust, and likewise to avoid all investments of that class which are attended with hazard.”

That does not mean that the trustee is bound to avoid all risk and in effect act as an insurer of the trust fund: see Bacon VC in In re Godfrey (1883) 23 Ch.D. 483, 493:

“No doubt it is the duty of a trustee, in administering the trusts of a will, to deal with property intrusted into his care exactly as any prudent man would deal with his own property. But the words in which the rule is expressed must not be strained beyond their meaning. Prudent businessmen in their dealings incur risk. That may and must happen in almost all human affairs.”

The distinction is between a prudent degree of risk on the one hand, and hazard on the other. Nor must the court be astute to fix liability upon a trustee who has committed no more than an error of judgment, from which no business man, however prudent, can expect to be immune: see Lopes L.J. in In re Chapman [1896] 2 Ch. 763, 778:

“A trustee who is honest and reasonably competent is not to be held responsible for a mere error in judgment when the question which he has to consider is whether a security of a class authorized, but depreciated in value, should be retained or realized, provided he acts with reasonable care, prudence, and circumspection.”

If the trust had existed without the incorporation of BTL, so that the bank held the freehold and leasehold properties and other assets of BTL directly upon the trusts of the settlement, it would in my opinion have been a clear breach of trust for the bank to have hazarded trust money upon the Old Bailey development project in partnership with Stock Conversion. The Old Bailey project was a gamble, because it involved buying into the site at prices in excess of the investment values of the properties, with no certainty or probability, with no more than a chance, that planning permission could be obtained for a financially viable redevelopment, that the numerous proprietors would agree to sell out or join in the scheme, that finance would be available upon acceptable terms, and that the development would be completed, or at least become a marketable asset, before the time came to start winding up the trust. However one looks at it, the project was a hazardous speculation upon which no trustee could properly have ventured without explicit authority in the trust instrument. I therefore hold that the entire expenditure in the Old Bailey project would have been incurred in breach of trust, had the money been spent by the bank itself. The fact that it was a risk acceptable to the board of a wealthy company like Stock Conversion has little relevance.

I turn to the question, what was the duty of the bank as the holder of shares in BTL and BTH? I will first answer this question without regard to the position of the bank as a specialist trustee, to which I will advert later. The bank, as trustee, was bound to act in relation to the shares and to the controlling position which they conferred, in the same manner as a prudent man of business. The prudent man of business will act in such manner as is necessary to safeguard his investment. He will do this in two ways. If facts come to his knowledge which tell him that the company's affairs are not being conducted as they should be, or which put him on inquiry, he will take appropriate action. Appropriate action will no doubt consist in the first instance of inquiry of and consultation with the directors, and in the last but most unlikely resort, the convening of a general meeting to replace one or more directors. What the prudent man of business will not do is to content himself with the receipt of such information on the affairs of the company as a shareholder ordinarily receives at annual general meetings. Since he has the power to do so, he will go further and see that he has sufficient information to enable him to make a responsible decision from time to time either to let matters proceed as they are proceeding, or to intervene if he is dissatisfied. This topic was considered by Cross J. in In re Lucking's Will Trusts' [1968] 1 W.L.R. 866, more fully reported in [1967] 3 All E.R. 726 . In that case nearly 70 per cent. of the shares in the company were held by two trustees, L and B, as part of the estate of a deceased; about 29 per cent. belonged to L in his own right, and 1 per cent. belonged to L's wife. The directors in 1954 were Mr. and Mrs. L and D, who was the manager of the business. In 1956 B was appointed trustee to act jointly with L. The company was engaged in the manufacture and sale of shoe accessories. It had a small factory employing about 20 people, and one or two travellers. It also had an agency in France. D wrongfully drew some £15,000 from the company's bank account in excess of his remuneration, and later became bankrupt. The money was lost. Cross J. said, at p. 874:

“The conduct of the defendant trustees is, I think, to be judged by the standard applied in Speight v. Gaunt, namely, that a trustee is only bound to conduct the business of the trust in such a way as an ordinary prudent man would conduct a business of his own. Now what steps, if any, does a reasonably prudent man who finds himself a majority shareholder in a private company take with regard to the management of the company's affairs? He does not, I think, content himself with such information as to the management of the company's affairs as he is entitled to as shareholder, but ensures that he is represented on the board. He may be prepared to run the business himself as managing director or, at least, to become a non-executive director while having the business managed by someone else. Alternatively, he may find someone who will act as his nominee on the board and report to him from time to time as to the company's affairs. In the same way, as it seems to me, trustees holding a controlling interest ought to ensure so far as they can that they have such information as to the progress of the company's affairs as directors would have. If they sit back and allow the company to be run by the minority shareholder and receive no more information than shareholders are entitled to, they do so at their risk if things go wrong.”

I do not understand Cross J. to have been saying that in every case where trustees have a controlling interest in a company it is their duty to ensure that one of their number is a director or that they have a nominee on the board who will report from time to time on the affairs of the company. He was merely outlining convenient methods by which a prudent man of business (as also a trustee) with a controlling interest in a private company, can place himself in a position to make an informed decision whether any action is appropriate to be taken for the protection of his asset. Other methods may be equally satisfactory and convenient, depending upon the circumstances of the individual case. Alternatives which spring to mind are the receipt of copies of the agenda and minutes of board meetings if regularly held, the receipt of monthly management accounts in the case of a trading concern, or quarterly reports. Every case will depend on its own facts. The possibilities are endless. It would be useless, indeed misleading, to seek to lay down a general rule. The purpose to be achieved is not that of monitoring every move of the directors, but of making it reasonably probable, so far as circumstances permit, that the trustee or (as in the Lucking case) one of them will receive an adequate flow of information in time to enable the trustees to make use of their controlling interest should this be necessary for the protection of their trust asset, namely, the shareholding. The obtaining of information is not an end in itself, but merely a means of enabling the trustees to safeguard the interests of their beneficiaries.

The principle enunciated in the Lucking case appears to have been applied in In re Miller (unreported), March 21, 1978, a decision of Oliver J. No transcript of the judgment is available but the case is briefly noted in the Law Society's Gazette published on May 3, 1978. There is also a number of American decisions proceeding upon the same lines, to which counsel has helpfully referred me.

So far, I have applied the test of the ordinary prudent man of business. Although I am not aware that the point has previously been considered, except briefly in In re Waterman's Will Trusts [1952] 2 All E.R. 1054, I am of opinion that a higher duty of care is plainly due from someone like a trust corporation which carries on a specialised business of trust management. A trust corporation holds itself out in its advertising literature as being above ordinary mortals. With a specialist staff of trained trust officers and managers, with ready access to financial information and professional advice, dealing with and solving trust problems day after day, the trust corporation holds itself out, and rightly, as capable of providing an expertise which it would be unrealistic to expect and unjust to demand from the ordinary prudent man or woman who accepts, probably unpaid and sometimes reluctantly from a sense of family duty, the burdens of a trusteeship. Just as, under the law of contract, a professional person possessed of a particular skill is liable for breach of contract if he neglects to use the skill and experience which he professes, so I think that a professional corporate trustee is liable for breach of trust if loss is caused to the trust fund because it neglects to exercise the special care and skill which it professes to have. The advertising literature of the bank was not in evidence (other than the scale of fees) but counsel for the defendant did not dispute that trust corporations, including the bank, hold themselves out as possessing a superior ability for the conduct of trust business, and in any event I would take judicial notice of that fact. Having expressed my view of the higher duty required from a trust corporation, I should add that the bank's counsel did not dispute the proposition.

In my judgment the bank wrongfully and in breach of trust neglected to ensure that it received an adequate flow of information concerning the intentions and activities of the boards of BTL and BTH. It was not proper for the bank to confine itself to the receipt of the annual balance sheet and profit and loss account, detailed annual financial statements and the chairman's report and statement, and to attendance at the annual general meetings and the luncheons that followed, which were the limits of the bank's regular sources of information. Had the bank been in receipt of more frequent information it would have been able to step in and stop, and ought to have stopped, Mr. Roberts and the board embarking on the Old Bailey project. That project was imprudent and hazardous and wholly unsuitable for a trust whether undertaken by the bank direct or through the medium of its wholly owned company. Even without the regular flow of information which the bank ought to have had, it knew enough to put it upon inquiry. There were enough obvious points at which the bank should have intervened and asked questions. Assuming, as I do, that the questions would have been answered truthfully, the bank would have discovered the gamble upon which Mr. Roberts and his board were about to embark in relation to the Old Bailey site, and it could have, and should have, stopped the initial move towards disaster, and later on arrested further progress towards disaster. I have indicated in the course of this judgment a number of obvious points at which the bank should have intervened, and it would be repetitive to summarise them.

I hold that the bank failed in its duty whether it is judged by the standard of the prudent man of business or of the skilled trust corporation. The bank's breach of duty caused the loss which was suffered by the trust estate. If the bank had intervened as it could and should have, that loss would not have been incurred. By “loss,” I mean the depreciation which took place in the market value of the BT shares, by comparison with the value which the shares would have commanded if the loss on the Old Bailey project had not been incurred, and reduction of dividends through loss of income. The bank is liable for the loss so suffered by the trust estate, except to the extent that I shall hereafter indicate.

== Significance ==
This rule bears a striking similarity to that enacted in s 1 Trustee Act 2000. It can, however, be excluded in a trust instrument (see Sch 1, para 7 TA 2000). The Act essentially adopted and strengthened Brightman J's principles. There was also, under the Stewardship Code, a codification of principles regarding becoming active in use of corporate governance rights in companies.

== See also ==
- English trusts law
- Nestle v National Westminster Bank plc [1993] 1 WLR 1260
