= Belchier v Parsons =

1754 English trusts law case

- Court: Court of Chancery
- Decided: 14 March 1754
- Citation: (1754) 1 Kenyon 38, (1754) 96 ER 908

Case opinions
- Lord Hardwicke LC

Keywords
- Prudent person rule, bankruptcy

Belchier v Parsons (1754) 96 ER 908 is an English trusts law case, which stands as one of the earliest formulations of the prudent person rule.

== Facts ==
Mr Holden had gone bankrupt, owing money to a range of creditors. Mrs Parsons was chosen as an assignee of the bankrupt estate, and she employed a broker, Mr Wigan, to sell off the assets (including a large quantity of tobacco) at public auction, and recover money for them. Mr Wigan did recover money, however fell sick and died ten days afterwards. It transpired that he was also bankrupt, and not enough to repay his own creditors. He had only paid over a small share of the proceeds from the tobacco sale to Mrs Parsons. The creditors of Mr Holden therefore sued Mrs Parsons, alleging that she should be liable for negligence in employing such a broker.

The Attorney General, Solicitor General, Mr Wilbraham speaking for Mrs Parsons pleaded that she should only be liable for the money that she had received, because Mr Wigan had been in good credit when he was employed, and so she had not been negligent. Nor was there any pretence of collusion or fraud. As the report read, he submitted,

It would be extremely hard to make her answerable for accidents which she could neither foresee, nor prevent: that trustees, unless some gross neglect, or fraud appeared, were never chargeable, in this Court, with more than actually came to their hands: that if a trustee managed a trust as a prudent man might be supposed to act in respect of his own affairs, he would never be answerable for accidental losses: that there have been variety of cases in which this Court has exempted trustees from losses that have happened in their trust, which might be reduced under three general heads: and those were, 1st. In the case of a necessary act: 2d. Where the loss was occasioned by some inevitable accident: 3d. Where the act done was prudent at the time, though it may occasion a loss.

That, in general, it is sufficient for a man to take the same care in the management of a trust, as he would in the management of his own affairs: that of the 1st sort was the case of two trustees who join in a receipt, one only actually receiving the money; the other in that case was never held responsible, because his joining was a necessary act; but in the case of executors it is otherwise, because it is not necessary for them to join, the receipt of one alone being a sufficient discharge. That of the second sort was the case where a trustee, &c. was robbed or the like; that being an accident which he could not foresee, or avoid, he was always exempted. That of the third sort were the following instances: in the case of my Lord Plymouth, Mr. Llewelyn, the receiver appointed of his estate during his infancy, having taken bills of exchange from one Mr. Winslow, a merchant in Worcester, [41] for about £800, those bills, when offered for acceptance, were refused, and protested, and Winslow becoming insolvent, the money was lost. The question was, whether Llewelyn should be answerable for it? And it appearing that Winslow was in good credit, and had the reputation of a man of fortune, and that Llewelyn had usually remitted the produce of my lord's estate through his hands, your Lordship held, that he ought not to bear the loss, (though that was the case of a receiver, who had a salary, and therefore might, with abundantly more reason, have been obliged to indemnify against accidental losses) for that some method must have been taken of remitting the money, and this was the properest, as well as the most usual method of doing it; and as the loss was such as he could not foresee, nor owing to any negligence of his, he ought not to make it good.

So in the case of Blew v. Marshall, before Lord Talbot in 1735, (which was the case of an administrator, who, in conformity to the rigid rules of the common law, is much more strictly dealt with than a trustee) a tenant being considerably in arrear, and absconding, so that there was very little probability of recovering that arrear, refusing also to give up the possession, and a good deal of difficulty being likely to occur in getting it; the administrator thought it more for the interest of the intestate's estate, to give up his demand for the arrears to obtain the possession; and accordingly on the tenant's giving up the possession, he released the arrears to him: and it becoming a question, whether or no he should be charged with those arrears; Lord Talbot thought, from the situation of the affair, that the step he had taken was a prudent one, and for the benefit of the estate, and therefore held he should not be liable. This case was cited to your Lordship in a case of Worthington v. Stamfellow, and you was pleased to say, you should have been of the same opinion.

If then in the case of a receiver, who is paid for his labour, and of an administrator, whose acts must conform to the severity of the common law, much more will that doctrine prevail in the present case, where Mrs. Parsons is a mere equitable trustee, acting for the benefit of creditors, without any expectation of gain, or reward to herself.

This case falls under all the before-mentioned heads of exemption: her employing somebody to sell was a necessary act: the insolvency of the person employed was an accident which she could not foresee, or prevent: the choice of this person, as he was a broker of credit, was prudent at the time, though it eventually turned out to be otherwise. Had she done an unusual act, it might have had a different construction, as was the case of Lord Litchfield and Sir John Williams, where the assignees employing the clerk of the commission to receive the debts of the bankrupt, that being unusual, the Court held they were answerable for him: but the employing a broker, in this case, appears from our evidence (which they have examined none to controvert) to be always customary; and where is the impropriety of it? We might, it is true, have employed an agent to receive the money; but why should not the broker be intrusted with the money as well as the goods, which he is always in possession of, to sort them, &c. before the sale? And surely had they been, in that case, embezzled, it would not have been pretended that we were liable to make them good; for his sorting, selling, &c. were necessary acts, and for the benefit of the creditors, which we, being unconversant in these affairs, could not have done ourselves. Were trustees, assignees, &c. who receive no advantage from their offices, to be held answerable for the acts of the people they employ, in cases where it is necessary they should employ somebody, and no imprudence is imputed to them in the choice, no one would be fool-hardy enough to undertake those offices.

Counsel for the creditors argued that Mrs Parsons nevertheless ought to have been deemed negligent, because it should have been usual practice for her to have collected the money from the auction at the latest a day or two after.

== Judgment ==
Lord Hardwicke LC held that Mrs Parsons was not liable for the full sum of money, only the money that she had actually received, because she had acted in a way that a prudent man, managing his own affairs, would.

I am of opinion that there are no grounds to make Mrs. Parsons answerable in this cause for any more of the money than what she actually received. Were it once to be laid down, as a rule in this Court, that an assignee, or trustee, should be answerable in all events for the people they employ, no man in his senses would ever undertake those offices. In the case of executors, and administrators, the common law does, in most cases, consider the persons receiving by their directions only as the hands by which they receive; and this Court likewise, to preserve some consistency with the common law, does confine them to stricter rules, and what is a devastavit at law, must be so here. But in the case of trustees, and assignees, particularly, who are acting immediately under the authority of this Court, it has always admitted of greater latitude; nay, in the former case, this Court, and sometimes even the Courts of Law, have dispensed with that rigour. In cases of this kind, it is not to be expected that the assignees will themselves attend the disposition of the bankrupt's effects, and less so still in the present case, from the sex of the person whom the creditors have thought proper to choose assignee: nor would it indeed be for the benefit of the creditors, if they did, brokers, and such sort of people, being more conversant with the effects to be disposed of, better judges of their value, and more capable of disposing of them to advantage. And I am of opinion, here is sufficient evidence of its being customary for the brokers, in these cases, to receive the money: one of the witnesses indeed, who is himself only conversant in sales of household goods, &c. says that it is so in his way of business, but in mercantile transactions it may be otherwise: and another says, that sometimes he has known a person appointed to receive the money, and not the broker, who sold the goods: but where is the difference? the broker, when she employed him, was a man in business, and credit; had she appointed another person, he could be no more; he too might have failed: 'tis impossible to know the circumstances of men with absolute certainty. She might indeed have taken security, but that security might have failed, and she could not have security for security; besides, this would have obstructed, and stopped the affair, and been contrary to the customs, and rules, of these sort of transactions. I think indeed that the broker who sells, if a man of credit, is the properest person to receive the money, and the Court has always thought so. For what is more common in this Court, when the property of ships, goods, or merchandizes, is disputed, than to direct the same to be sold by some broker of reputation, and credit, who is to receive the money, and pay it into the bank, to wait the event of the cause? The broker in these cases may fail, and the money never be paid into the bank, but that is the usual way of doing business, and this is an accident which cannot be foreseen or guarded against. The goods themselves being in the broker's possession is very material, since if he was fit to be intrusted with these, why not with the money? as they are equally liable to be embezzled. And though these goods might be, as the counsel for Mr. Belchier contend, in the warehouse, that would not alter the case; for if the broker had the key, as he necessarily must, for the purpose of sorting, &c. previous to the sale, that, being all that is usual in these cases where goods are generally permitted to remain in the warehouse, has been determined to be proper possession, and does certainly enable him to dispose of them at his pleasure, as much as if they had been in his own house. And I do not see that Mrs. Parsons has been guilty of any laches: it appears, the man fell sick a few days after the sale, and of that sickness died. Whether or no she applied to him during his sickness, does not appear; perhaps she might not be very pressing, and in that situation it would not be very consistent with humanity to be so. But upon the whole I do not think she has been guilty of any blameable negligence, any crassa negligentia, to make her answerable in this Court for money she confessedly did not receive.

This is not like the case that has been mentioned of a goldsmith's note, where, for the benefit of trade, that being looked upon as money, the drawer has been indemnified, if not offered the drawee in season. To manage a trust in the manner a man would manage his own affairs, is, in general, sufficient; but that is not to be understood that a trustee may act wildly, and arbitrarily, as a man may in his own affairs, but as a prudent man, it may be supposed, would do.

In case of necessary acts, or acts prudent at the time, trustees have been always indemnified. By necessary acts are meant two sorts of necessity, a legal necessity, and a moral necessity: a legal necessity is, where, as in the case which has been mentioned, two trustees join in a receipt, that, being legally necessary to discharge the debtor, shall not charge the parties, but the person actually receiving shall alone be answerable: in the case of executors it is otherwise, for payment to one executor is sufficient, one executor having an absolute power over the testator's estate, and being capable of releasing a debt, disposing of any part of the effects, assigning a leasehold estate, &c. and his act will bind the rest: whereas in the case of trustees they must join. A moral necessity is, as in the case of Lord Plymouth: the receiver's business was to receive the produce of my lord's estate, and remit it to London: for that purpose he must either have remitted it in the manner he did, or brought, or sent it to town in cash, in both of which there was some hazard: it is true, he might have come to town with it guarded; but since the increase of trade, and commerce, inland bills of exchange becoming more frequent, that has not been insisted on; and as the person through whose hands he remitted it was a person of reputation, and had usually conveyed it safe, the Court thought he ought not to be answerable for a loss which was no way to be imputed to him, notwithstanding he was a receiver, and had a salary, which, it was urged, implied an undertaking to indemnify, &c. In the present case the party being a trustee for the benefit of others, without any expectation of gain, or reward, is, to be sure, more to be favored, for that has always been considered as a material ingredient in questions of this kind. I remember a case of a similar nature of my Lord C. J. Eyre, who was guardian to Lord Shaftesbury, under the will of the late earl: he had appointed a steward of one of his lordship's estates in the north, who failed, with about £500 or £600 in arrear; and it becoming a question whether the Chief Justice should be answerable for it? I remember it was thought he ought not to be answerable, as it was impossible he could receive the rents of the several estates himself, and as the man had been employed by the late earl himself. I do not remember whether that case was ever before the Court, or not; but I know, the principal counsel were consulted in it, and that was their opinion.

Under the head of prudent acts, was the determination that has been mentioned of my Lord Talbot: and certainly it would be very unreasonable that a trustee should be a sufferer by any act apparently for the good of the persons entitled to the benefit of the trust: and this Court will be always cautious of establishing any rules that may deter people from undertaking offices of this nature, by subjecting them to the hazard of becoming considerable losers, without any possibility of gain.

Therefore let the exception be allowed.

== See also ==
- English trusts law
- UK bankruptcy law
- UK insolvency law
- Harvard College v Armory
- Learoyd v Whiteley
