= Harvard College v. Amory =

1830 US trusts law case

Harvard College v Amory
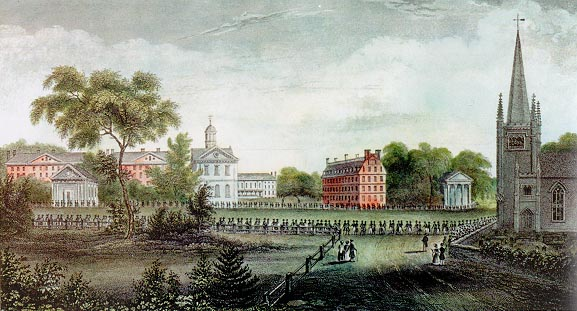
- Citation: (1830) 26 Mass (9 Pick) 446

Case opinions
- Putnam J

Keywords
- Prudent man rule

Harvard College v. Amory 26 Mass (9 Pick) 446 (1830) is a US trusts law case, which repeated the famous formulation of the "prudent man rule", that people in charge of other people's money must exercise due care and skill, and look after the money as if it were their own.

== Facts ==
John McLean died on 23 October 1823, and in his will he left $35,000, some personal property and a house to his wife, Ann McLean. He also left $50,000 to Jonathan Amory and Francis Amory in trust to loan or invest "in safe and productive stock, either in the public funds, bank shares, or other stock, according to their best judgment and discretion." The proceeds from the investments were to be paid to his wife, in quarterly or semi annual payments. On her death, half the value of the fund was to go to the President and Fellows of Harvard College, to "be exclusively and forever appropriated to the support of a professor of ancient and modern history, at that college." The other money was to go to the Trustees of the Massachusetts General Hospital.

The trust deed also said "not doubting that they will faithfully and conscientiously discharge and execute the trusts hereby reposed in them, and being desirous of relieving them from the burden of procuring sureties for large sums - I do request and direct that they may not be required to give any other than their own bonds respectively, without sureties, conditioned for the performance and execution of the said trusts; and I do order and direct, that they shall not be held responsible for the acts, doings, and defaults of each other, but shall simply be accountable respectively each for his own acts, doings, and defaults, as such trustees.

Francis Amory, the surviving trustee, tendered his resignation in 1828. Harvard College and the Massachusetts Hospital sued him, because the accounts showed a loss of money on the investments. They had invested the money in incorporated manufacturing and insurance companies, including the Boston Manufacturing Company, and the Merrimack Manufacturing Company. The college and the Hospital alleged that this choice of investments was speculative and negligent.

== Judgment ==
On appeal, the court held that Mr Amory was not liable for the losses. Justice Samuel Putnam wrote the opinion, saying,

All that can be required of a trustee is, that he shall conduct himself faithfully and exercise a sound discretion. He is to observe how men of prudence, discretion and intelligence manage their own affairs, not in regard to speculation, but in regard to the permanent disposition of their funds, considering the probable income as well as the probable safety of the capital to be invested… Do what you will, the capital is at hazard.

== See also ==
- US trusts law
- English trusts law
- Learoyd v Whiteley
- Speight v Gaunt (1882) 22 Ch D 727, 739, Sir George Jessel MR, 'It seems to me that on general principles a trustee ought to conduct the business of the trust in the same manner that an ordinary prudent man of business would conduct his own, and that beyond that there is no liability or obligation on the trustee.'
- Belchier v Parsons (1754) 1 Kenyon 38, (1754) 96 ER 908
