= Creen v Wright =

English contract law and labour case

- Court: Common Pleas Division
- Decided: 10 May 1876
- Citation: (1875-76) LR 1 CPD 591

Case opinions
- Lord Coleridge CJ, Archibald LJ and Lindley LJ

Creen v Wright (1875–76) LR 1 CPD 591 is an English contract law and labour law case concerning wrongful dismissal and the appropriate period of reasonable notice to be implied at common law in a contract of employment.

== Facts ==
Mr. Creen was a master mariner, in command of Mr. Wright's ship under a written agreement. This said,

“I hereby accept the command of the ship City Camp on the following terms: Salary to be at and after the rate of 180l. sterling per annum... Should owners require captain to leave the ship abroad, his wages to cease on the day he is required to give up the command, and the owners have the option of paying or not paying his expenses travelling home... Wages to begin when captain joins the ship.”

Mr. Creen had arrived at Liverpool and discharged some cargo. More was loaded on when on 10 August 1875 Mr. Wright without notice or justifiable cause, purported to dismiss Mr. Creen. He argued that Mr. Creen was not entitled to any notice.

The first instance just agreed that without any evidence of custom of notice periods in the trade (as there was with clerks and servants) Mr. Creen was not entitled to notice. He appealed. The submissions of counsel were reported as follows.

TH James shewed cause. By the express terms of the contract the owner had a right to dismiss the captain abroad at any time. The hiring was for an indefinite time, and was determinable at any time, at all events before the commencement of a voyage. In Smith's Master and Servant, 3rd ed p 76, it is said: “In cases to which the custom applicable to domestic servants does not apply, and in which no specific agreement has been made as to the notice to be given for the purpose of determining the contract, the question must be determined by the custom applicable to the particular trade or calling with reference to which the service is to be rendered.” Here there is no custom. In Hiscox v Batchelor, where a written agreement to employ a person as an advertising agent contained no provision as to the notice which should determine the agreement, Byles, J., said that the notice must be a reasonable one; and, a month's notice having been given, the jury found for the defendant. So, in Foxall v International Land Credit Co, it was left by the same learned judge to the jury to say what was a reasonable notice in the case of a clerk. In the present case, the hiring was not an ordinary hiring for a year. The defendant had clearly a right to dismiss the plaintiff before the commencement of the new voyage.

Lord Coleridge CJ The hiring being indefinite, it is a hiring for a year, in the absence of anything to shew the contrary: Rex v Inhabitants of Hampreston.

TH James: The case of a master of a ship is an exceptional one.

Lord Coleridge CJ: Why so?

TH James: It would be extremely inconvenient if the service were to determine in the middle of a voyage; therefore it cannot be intended to be a service for a year. The parties here have expressly stipulated to exclude notice; by the very terms of the contract the wages are to cease from the day the captain is required to give up the command of the ship.

Herschell QC: in support of the order. The ruling of the learned judge cannot be supported. Primâ facie, no doubt, an indefinite hiring is a hiring for a year determinable by notice if there be a custom, or, in the absence of custom, by a reasonable notice. If it be determinable without notice by the employer, it must be equally so by the employé. That in a case like this would be so unreasonable that it cannot be presumed to have been the intention of the parties. It may be that by custom the engagement might have been determinable at the end of the voyage, viz. at Belize. But there was evidence of the continuance of the hiring beyond that period: and that would be for the jury. In Fairman v Oakford, Pollock CB says: “There is no inflexible rule that a general hiring is a hiring for a year; each particular case must depend on its own circumstances. From much experience of juries, I have come to the conclusion that usually the indefinite hiring of a clerk is not a hiring for a year (absolutely), but rather one determinable by three months' notice.” Here the stipulation for a dismissal without notice is expressly confined to a dismissal abroad.

Lord Coleridge CJ We entertain a strong opinion in this case: but, as the matter is one of great general importance, and one upon which there is no distinct authority, we will take time to consider.

== Judgment ==
Lord Coleridge CJ held that Mr. Creen could not (except under unusual circumstances) be dismissed without a reasonable notice. He delivered the judgment of the court (Archibald LJ and Lindley LJ).

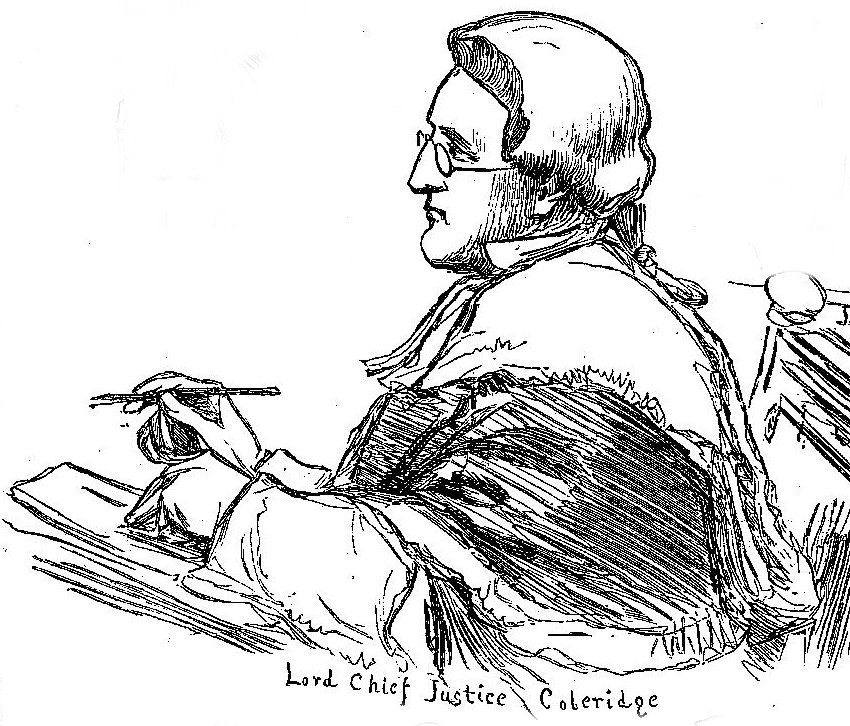
Lord Coleridge CJ

This was an action tried before my Brother Lush at Liverpool in December, 1875, in which he directed a verdict to be entered for the defendant; and we have to determine whether that direction was correct.

The plaintiff had been the master of the ship City Camp, under a written contract dated the 28th of March, 1875, from that day until the 10th of August, 1875, when he was dismissed, not for misconduct, but without notice, the defendant contending that, by the terms of the contract between the plaintiff and himself, the plaintiff was not entitled to any notice before dismissal. Other points arose in the case, but were not discussed before us.

The action was brought for a dismissal wrongful in being without notice; and the sole question argued was, whether, under the contract, the plaintiff was entitled to notice before dismissal, and on this single point my Brother Lush directed the verdict for the defendant.

The contract, so far as it is material to set it out, was as follows:—“I hereby accept the command of the ship City Camp on the following terms: Salary to be at and after the rate of 180l. sterling per annum.” Then followed certain other terms not material, and then,—

“Should owners require captain to leave the ship abroad, his wages to cease on the day he is required to give up the command, and the owners have the option of paying or not paying his expenses travelling home. … Wages to begin when captain joins the ship.”

“Francis Creen, Master, City Camp .”

It was contended for the plaintiff that, under this contract, he was entitled to a reasonable notice before dismissal, at any rate if dismissed in this country; and my Brother Lush held that he was not: but, upon consideration, we are of opinion that he was.

The relation of the master of a ship to his employer, the shipowner, is not one in which, in the case of an indefinite hiring, the law has made, and there was no evidence of any custom making, the hiring a hiring for a year or for any other definite time, nor the notice by which the service is to be determined certain. As to the hiring, we adopt the language of Pollock CB, in delivering the judgment of the Court in Fairman v Oakford:,

“There is no inflexible rule that an indefinite hiring is a hiring for a year. Each particular case must depend upon its own circumstances.”

As to the notice, we think the sound construction of the contract before us is, that, except in the single case provided for by its terms, there must be a reasonable notice before it can be put an end to by either party. The rule of construction must be the same for both parties to the contract. If the ship-owner may dismiss the master without notice on the very eve of a voyage, the master may leave the ship without notice at the same point of time. But the great inconvenience and heavy loss which might be, and indeed in most cases would be, inflicted on the ship-owner, without any remedy, by such a construction of the contract if acted on by the master, lead us to believe that such is not and could not be the meaning of the contract nor the intention of the parties to it. The loss and inconvenience to the master following upon the construction contended for, though not positively so great, may be relatively very great indeed: and this consideration points to the same conclusion. The provision that the master's wages shall cease instantly upon dismissal abroad, may well have been intended to prevent any question as to the ship-owner being liable to the whole expense of bringing the master back to the United Kingdom; and does not appear to us to permit an argument for construing the contract so as to enable either party to put an end to it at any time without notice of any kind. Indeed, upon the construction of the contract contended for by the plaintiff, and if no notice before putting an end to it was required at any time on the part of either master or ship-owner, it is not easy to assign a reason for the insertion of this particular provision into the contract. Nor was any satisfactory reason offered to us why the rule Expressio unius est exclusio alterius should not apply to it.

We think, therefore, that, under his contract, as the master could not, except under very unusual circumstances, be dismissed during the continuance of a voyage and while the vessel was at sea, so he was entitled to some notice, and that is to reasonable notice, before dismissal in this country.

There is some authority for saying that, as a proposition of general law, reasonable notice is to be implied as a term of such a contract of hiring as this. Sir John Byles so laid down the law at nisi prius in the case of Hiscox v Batchelor; and the case of Fairman v Oakford, already referred to, seems, if the facts of it be carefully considered, to be an authority to the same effect. For, in the absence of stipulation for any notice, a month's notice was held reasonable to determine an indefinite hiring of a clerk, on the ground that the same clerk had accepted such a notice as sufficient to determine a former indefinite hiring also without stipulation for notice of any kind. It is nowhere suggested that the absence of stipulation made no notice necessary in either of the hirings, which would have been a short and simple ground, if a sound one, for upholding the verdict in that case.

But, without intending to throw any doubt whatever upon these cases, we decide the one before us upon its own circumstances, and upon considerations especially applicable to the contract on which the dispute arose. And we think that the order must be absolute for a new trial.

== See also ==
- Employment at will
