= Harriet Putnam Fowler =

American writer, poet, and historian (1842–1901)

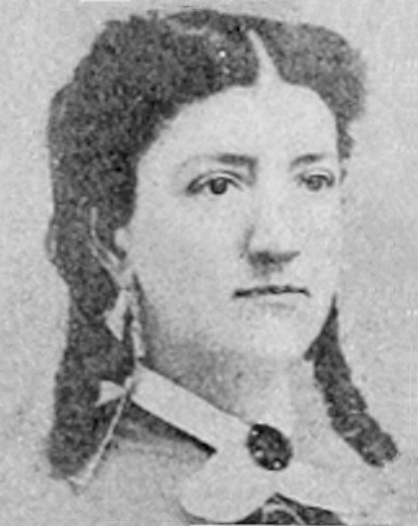
- Portrait from Herringshaw's Encyclopedia of American Biography of the Nineteenth Century (1906)
- Born: July 25, 1842 Danversport, Massachusetts, U.S.
- Died: July 28, 1901 (aged 59) Danvers, Massachusetts, U.S.
- Occupation: Author; poet; historian
- Subject: Vegetarianism; genealogy; history
- Relatives: Putnam family; Geoffrey Chaucer

Harriet Putnam Fowler (July 25, 1842 – July 28, 1901) was an American author, poet, and historian. Her many publications were chiefly in the genealogical and historical line. She created nearly 20 large manuscript volumes of family histories, which she presented to the Essex Institute, Salem, Massachusetts. She also compiled several memorial volumes, wrote numerous poems, and published several small volumes.

== Early life ==
Harriet Putnam Fowler was born July 25, 1842, in Danversport, Massachusetts. Her parents were Samuel and Harriet (Putnam) Page. She had two older siblings, Clara (b. 1836) and Samuel (b. 1838). Fowler was a member of the Putnam family, who were descendents of John Putnam who settled in Salem, Massachusetts in 1634. Fowler also traced her descent through sixteen generations to Catherine Chaucer, sister of Geoffrey Chaucer, the poet.

== Career ==
In 1879, she published a work entitled Vegetarianism: The Radical Cure for Intemperance. Next, she published a novel entitled Our Smoking Husbands and What to Do With Them. Later, she collated a series of ancestral books of genealogy and heraldry. She was the author of a book of poems entitled Puritan Bluebells, and like her mother, contributed poems to papers. Fowler also published short stories. Her article "The Home of 'Old Put'" appeared in The Rutland Daily Herald in 1886.

Although Fowler lived with a disability for 40 years as a result of an injury from an accident, (Note: According to Fowler's obituary in The Boston Globe, she had been an invalid in the years since the accident.) her final illness was of less than a week's duration. She died at her home in Danvers, Massachusetts, July 28, 1901. Her memoir was incomplete at the time of her death.

== Putnam family cupboard ==
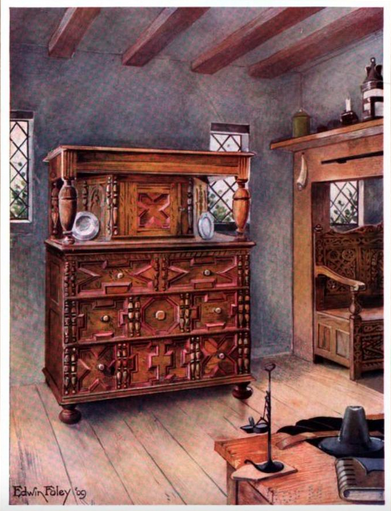
Putnam family cupboard

Fowler donated the Putnam cupboard of English oak and cedar to the Essex Institute. Her ancestor, John Putnam, imported it probably about the middle of the 17th century, as the chest of drawers which forms its lower part was not developed earlier, nor were the geometrical patterns of the cedar mouldings used in combination with the split balusters upon the pilasters, until that date. Upon its back are marks of a fire from which the cupboard was rescued when, some two centuries ago, the Putnams' house was destroyed. Certain vase finials which surmounted the posts, 'improvements' suggested by the taste of an 18th-century member of the family, were removed. The enclosed box settle with lifting lid in the Bulkeley Collection is almost unique among examples of colonial woodwork; when discovered in a stable at Barrington, Massachusetts, it had for many years been used to hold salt for cattle. It illustrates the earliest of the English modes of combining the chest and the table which produced the settle. The panelled framing of the seat indicates that cushions were intended. The usual type of earlier colonial settle more nearly resembled the high-back variety one finds in old village inns in this country. They were drawn in front of the fire upon a winter's night—especially when of curved shape, as in some old English inns until recent days—for the sake of light as well as warmth, in those days when the flicker of the Betty lamp, shown in the art work as an example, was the sole other illumination.

== Selected works ==
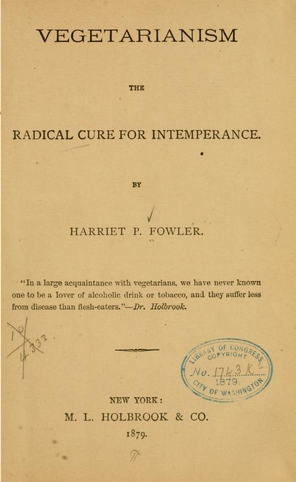
Title page of Vegetarianism: The Radical Cure for Intemperance

- Vegetarianism: The Radical Cure for Intemperance, 1879
- Our Smoking Husbands and What to Do With Them, c. 1879
- My Sleeping Father's Lovers, 1888
- Puritan Bluebells
