= Samuel Putnam (judge) =

American judge (1768–1853)

Samuel Putnam (May 13, 1768 – July 3, 1853) was a justice of the Massachusetts Supreme Judicial Court from 1814 to 1842. He was appointed by Governor Caleb Strong.

== Career ==
Born in Danvers, Massachusetts, Putnam attended Phillips Academy in Andover, and later graduated from Harvard in 1787. He was admitted to the Essex Bar in 1794 establishing a practice in Salem. Putnam was elected in 1808 and 1809 to represent Salem in the state senate. He eventually became a justice of the Massachusetts Supreme Judicial Court in 1814 where he wrote an opinion in Harvard College v. Amory, which established the Prudent man rule in US Law.

Concurrently during his tenure he was also elected in 1822 as a trustee of Dummer Academy (now The Governor's Academy). Putnam was honored in 1825 when he received a doctorate from the University of Cambridge in England. Putnam retired from the Massachusetts Judicial Court in 1842 and was replaced by associate justice Samuel Hubbard.

== Personal life ==
The childhood home of Samuel Putnam included his parents Gideon (1726–1811), and Hannah of the Putnam family. Samuel went on to marry Sarah Gooll (1772–1864) on October 28, 1795, and they had eight children. Some of his more prominent include Sarah Gooll Putnam (Crowninshield), and Elizabeth Cabot Putnam who was the wife of Augustus Lowell.

Putnam died in Boston, at the age of 85.

Legal offices
Preceded by Isaac Parker	Associate Justice of the Massachusetts Supreme Judicial Court; 1814–1842	Succeeded by Samuel Hubbard
