= Nathaniel Lindley, Baron Lindley =

English judge (1828–1921)

The Right Honourable The Lord Lindley PC KC FRS FBA
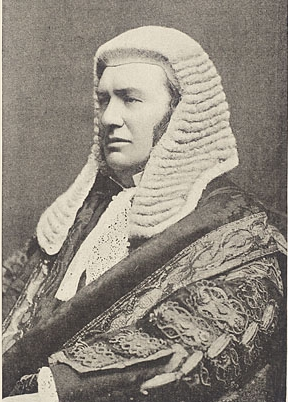

Lord of Appeal in Ordinary
- In office 10 May 1900 – 2 December 1905
- Preceded by: The Lord Morris

Master of the Rolls
- In office 19 October 1897 – 9 May 1900
- Preceded by: The Lord Esher
- Succeeded by: The Lord Alverstone

Personal details
- Born: Nathaniel Lindley; 29 November 1828 Acton Green, London, England
- Died: 9 December 1921 (aged 93)
- Citizenship: United Kingdom
- Parent: John Lindley
- Education: University College School
- Alma mater: University College London

Nathaniel Lindley, Baron Lindley, PC, KC, FRS, FBA (29 November 1828 – 9 December 1921) was an English judge.

== Early life ==
He was the second son of the botanist Dr. John Lindley, born at Acton Green, London. From his mother's side, he was descended from Sir Edward Coke. He was educated at University College School, and studied for a time at University College London, and the University of Edinburgh and University of Cambridge in 1898 and achieved Doctor of Civil Law in University of Oxford in 1903.

== Legal career ==
He was called to the bar at the Middle Temple in 1850, and began practice in the Court of Chancery. In 1855 he published An Introduction to the Study of Jurisprudence, consisting of a translation of the general part of Thibaut's System des Pandekten Rechts, with copious notes. In 1860 he published in two volumes his Treatise on the Law of Partnership, including its Application to Joint Stock and other Companies, and in 1862 a supplement including the Companies Act 1862. This work has since been developed into two textbooks well known to lawyers as Lindley on Companies and Lindley on Partnership. Among his pupils were Francis William Maclean, later Chief Justice of Bengal, and Frederick Pollock.

He took silk in February 1872. In 1874 he was elected a bencher of the Middle Temple, of which he was treasurer in 1894

=== Judicial career ===
In 1875, he was appointed to be a Serjeant-at-law and a Justice of the Court of Common Pleas, the appointment of a chancery barrister to a common law court being justified by the fusion of common law and equity then shortly to be brought about, in theory at all events, by the Judicature Acts.

In 1875, he was knighted. In 1880 he became a justice of the Queen's Bench and in 1881 he was raised to be a Lord Justice of Appeal and was sworn of the Privy Council.

In 1897, Lord Justice Lindley succeeded Lord Esher as Master of the Rolls, and in 1900 he was made a Lord of Appeal in Ordinary with a life peerage and the title of Baron Lindley, of East Carleton in the County of Norfolk. He resigned the judicial post in 1905.

Prior to the 1875 reforms, the appointment of serjeants-at-law had already declined, but common law judges could only be appointed from amongst the serjeants-at-law, so it was customary for any appointee who was not yet a serjeant to be appointed a serjeant immediately prior to being appointed a judge. As the requirement for common law judges to be serjeants was abolished shortly after, Lord Lindley became the last serjeant-at-law appointed, and the last judge to wear the serjeant's coif, or rather the black patch representing it, on the judicial wig.

Mount Lindley in Antarctica is named after him.

== Family ==
He married Sarah Katharine, daughter of Edward John Teale of Leeds, on 5 Aug 1858. He died at home in East Carleton, near Norwich, in 1921. They had nine children, including diplomat Sir Francis Oswald Lindley and the army officer Major-General John Lindley.

== Coat of arms ==
Coat of arms of Nathaniel Lindley, Baron Lindley
Crest In front of a Pelican in her piety Argent, vulning herself proper, and charged with a Pheon point downwards Or, three Quatrefoils fesswise Or. Escutcheon Argent, on a Chief nebuly Azure, a Quatrefoil between two Griffin’s Heads erased Argent. Supporters Dexter: a Griffin wings elevated Argent, standing on a Fasces proper. Sinister: a Pelican wings elevated Argent, vulning herself and standing on a Fasces proper. Motto SIS FORTIS (May you be brave)

== Writing ==
Lord Lindley published two notable works, Lindley on Companies and Lindley on Partnership. The latter is still published today, as Lindley and Banks on Partnership, now in its 21st edition (2022).

== Cases ==
=== Company law ===
- Allen v Gold Reefs of West Africa Ltd [1900] 1 Ch 656
- Illingworth v Houldsworth [1904] AC 355, on floating charges
- Isle of Wight Rly Co v Tahourdin (1884) LR 25 Ch D 320 - a UK company law case on removing directors under the Companies Clauses Act 1845.
- Salomon v A Salomon & Co Ltd [1897] AC 22

=== Contract law ===
- Allcard v Skinner (1887) 36 Ch D 145
- Byrne v Van Tienhoven [1880] 5 CPD 344
- Carlill v Carbolic Smoke Ball Company [1892] EWCA Civ 1, [1893] 1 QB 256, [1892] 2 QB 484 (QBD) - an advertisement containing certain terms to get a reward constituted a binding unilateral offer that could be accepted by anyone who performed its terms.
- Creen v Wright (1875–76) LR 1 CPD 591
- Foakes v Beer (Lindley sitting in the Court of Appeal) [1884] UKHL 1, [1881-85] All ER Rep 106, (1884) 9 App Cas 605; 54 LJQB 130; 51 LT 833; 33 WR 233 - a leading case from the House of Lords on the legal concept of consideration
- Parker v South Eastern Railway (1877) 2 CPD 416

=== Property ===
- Colls v Home and Colonial Stores (1904)
- Chatenay v Brazilian Submarine Telegraph Company Ltd [1891] QB 79 - choice of law in relation to transactions under foreign powers of attorney

=== Tort ===
- Quinn v Leathem [1901] AC 495
- Robinson v Kilvert (1889) LR 41 ChD 88

=== Trusts and equity ===
- Speight v Gaunt (1883) 9 App Cas 1
- Learoyd v Whiteley (1886) 33 Ch D 347, 355

=== Other ===
- Knox v Gye (1872)
- In re Addlestone Linoleum Co (1887) 37 Ch D 191
- South Hetton Coal Co v Haswell, Shotton and Easington Coal and Coke Co [1898] 1 Ch. 465
- Taff Vale Railway Co v Amalgamated Society of Railway Servants [1901] AC 426
- Scottish Free Church case [1904] AC 515
- Shepheard v Broome [1904] AC 342

== Books ==
- Nathaniel Lindley, An Introduction to the Study of Jurisprudence; Being a Translation of the General Part of Thibaut’s System des Pandekten Rechts (William Maxwell, 1855)

== Notes ==
Legal offices
Preceded by Viscount Esher	Master of the Rolls; 1897–1900	Succeeded by Lord Alverstone
