= Chatenay v Brazilian Submarine Telegraph Company Ltd =

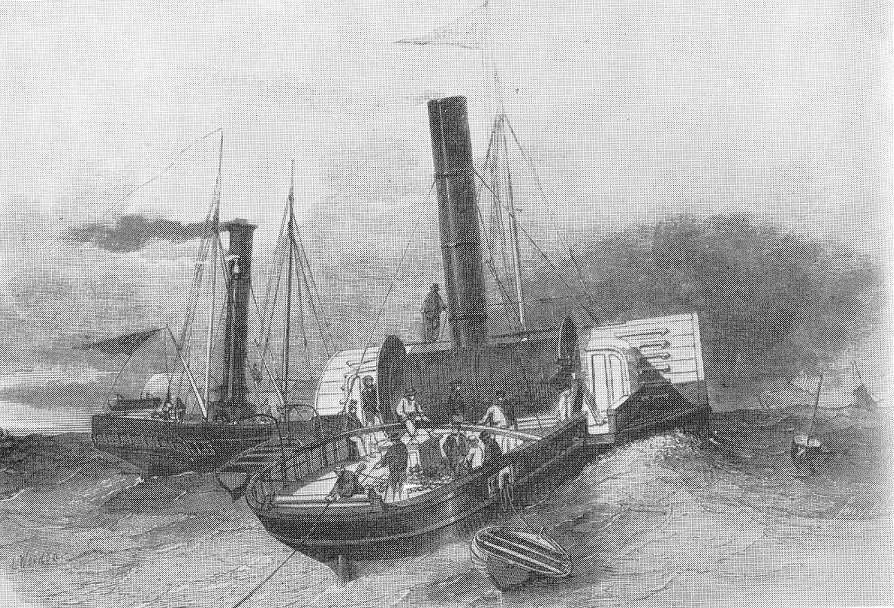
- A submarine cable laying ship.
- Court: Court of Appeal
- Decided: 25 October 1890
- Citation: [1891] 1 QB 79
- Transcript: ICLR

Court membership
- Judges sitting: Lord Esher MR; Lindley LJ; Lopes LJ

Keywords
- conflict of laws; power of attorney; choice of law; authority of agent

Chatenay v Brazilian Submarine Telegraph Company Ltd [1891] QB 79 is a judicial decision of the English Court of Appeal relating to the conflict of laws, and specifically which law should govern the validity of a transfer of property where the transfer was executed by an agent.

The Court of Appeal had to determine whether the validity of the transfer was a matter for Brazilian law (being the law which governed the grant of the power of attorney), or English law (being the law of the place where the agent contracted to sell the relevant property). The Court of Appeal held that the proper law to determine that issue was English law.

== Background ==
In 1880 the plaintiff (Chatenay), who was a Brazilian subject and resident in that country, executed a power of attorney in the Portuguese language and according to the formalities of Brazilian law. The power of attorney was granted in favour of one Broe, who was a stockbroker in London, and was expressed to confer upon him power to buy and sell securities in the name of the plaintiff.

Broe purported to sell various shares held by Chatenay in the Brazilian Submarine Telegraph Company Ltd, but then absconded with the funds. Chatenay then brought proceedings against the Brazilian Submarine Telegraph Company Ltd in England alleging that Broe lacked authority to sell the shares, and seeking rectification of the register to restore the shares into his name.

It was ordered that the issue of whether the construction of the power of attorney was a matter for English or Brazilian law should be determined as a preliminary issue.

== High Court ==
The matter came before Day J in the High Court, who decided that English law should govern the construction of the power of attorney.

== Court of Appeal ==
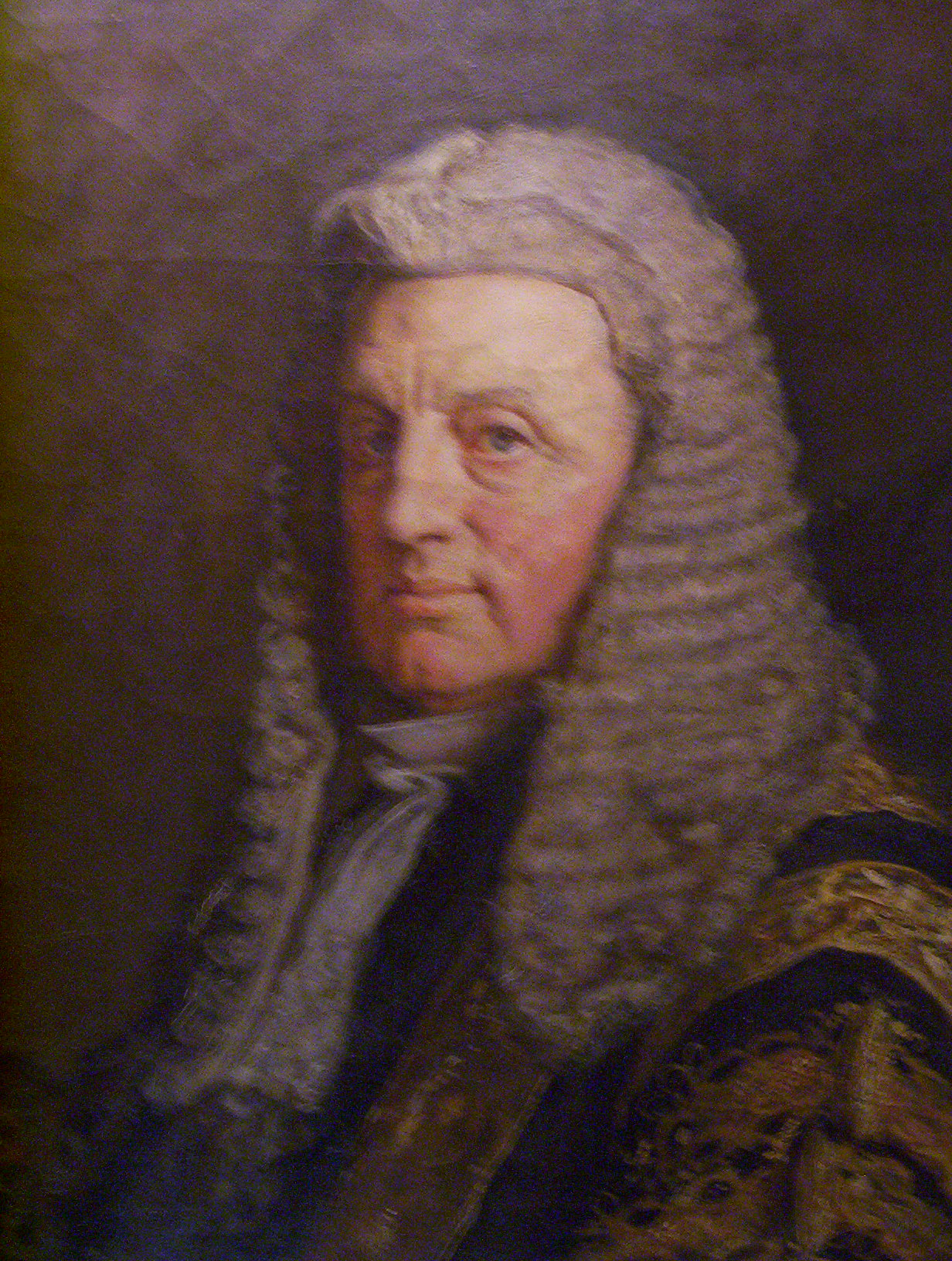
Lord Esher MR

In the Court of Appeal the Master of the Rolls, Lord Esher MR, gave the first judgment. Much of his judgment was dedicated to the issue of how to properly translate a foreign document for use in the English courts. But in relation to the specific issue on appeal, he held that although the proper construction was a matter for Brazilian law, but that "if according to such evidence the intention appears to be that the authority shall be acted upon in foreign countries, it follows that 'the extent of the authority in any country in which the authority is to be acted upon is to be taken to be according to the law of the particular country where it acted upon." (emphasis added)

Lindley LJ gave a short concurring judgment. He held that:

'That being the nature of the authority, how is it to be dealt with? If he buys and sell shares in England, he must buy and sell according to English law ... when you are dealing with what takes place in England - which is a transfer or a sale, or some dealing with shares - recourse must be had to English law.'

== Reception ==
The principle of law in the case has been broadly accepted in a number of subsequent judicial decisions. It was approved in Presentaciones Musicales SA v Secunda [1994] Ch 271 at 283; in Merrill Lynch Capital Services Inc v Municipality of Piraeus [1997] CLC 1214; and in SEB Trygg Holding Aktiebolag v Manches [2005] EWHC 35 (Comm) at [18]. It was also approved in Australia in Bendigo and Adelaide Bank Ltd v DY Logistics Pty Ltd [2018] VSC 558 at [24]:

‘The law applicable to the creation of a power of attorney is the law of the jurisdiction in which it was made. However, the law applicable to its construction and operation is that of the jurisdiction where the power operates or is intended to operate.’

Academic commentators have also accepted the correctness of the decision, both in the field of the conflict of laws, and also in the field of agency.
