= Compagnie Financiere du Pacifique v Peruvian Guano Co =

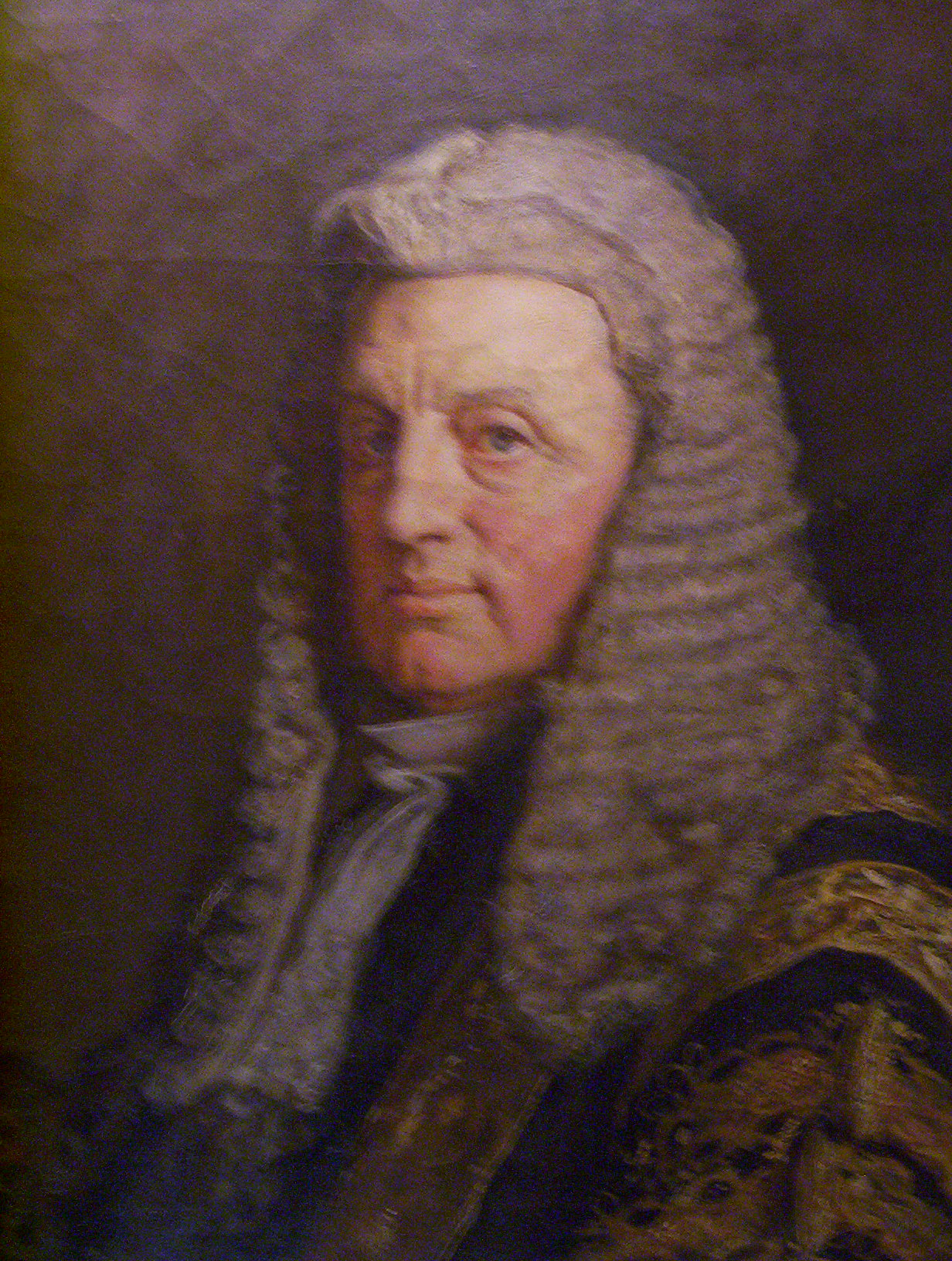
- Lord Justice Brett
- Court: Court of Appeal
- Full case name: Compagnie Financiere et Commerciale du Pacifique v The Peruvian Guano Co
- Decided: 20 December 1882
- Citation: (1882) 11 QBD 55

Court membership
- Judges sitting: Baggallay and Brett LJJ

Keywords
- Evidence (law), Civil procedure in England and Wales

Compagnie Financiere du Pacifique v Peruvian Guano Co (1882) 11 QBD 55 is a foundational case in the law of evidence holding that a plaintiff party must disclose to a defending party "all documents in his possession or under his control relating to any matters in question in the action." This was an important case in the development of the concept of discovery in the common law.

== Facts ==
The plaintiffs claimed the defendants had made a contract with them for the sale of Peruvian guano and sued for specific performance of the agreement, damages for delay and an injunction. The defendants took out a summons for further documents than were originally disclosed, were turned down repeatedly before appealing to the Court of Appeal.

== Judgments ==
In his judgment, Lord Justice Brett famously held,

"It seems to me that every document which relates to the matters in question in the action, which not only would be evidence upon any issue, but also which, it is reasonable to suppose, contains information which may – not which must – either directly or indirectly enable the party requiring the affidavit either to advance his own case or to damage the case of his adversary. I have put in the words ‘either directly or indirectly’ because, as it seems to me, a document can properly be said to contain information which may enable the party requiring the affidavit either to advance his own case or to damage the case of his adversary if it is a document which may fairly lead him to a train of enquiry which may have either of those two consequences."
