= Prudent man rule =

Common law principle concerning trusts

The prudent man rule is based on common law stemming from the 1830 Massachusetts court formulation Harvard College v. Amory. The prudent man rule, written by Massachusetts Justice Samuel Putnam (1768–1853), directs trustees "to observe how men of prudence, discretion and intelligence manage their own affairs, not in regard to speculation, but in regard to the permanent disposition of their funds, considering the probable income, as well as the probable safety of the capital to be invested."

Under the prudent man rule, when the governing trust instrument is silent concerning the types of investments permitted, the fiduciary is required to invest trust assets as a "prudent man" would invest his own property with the following factors in mind:

- the needs of beneficiaries;
- the need to preserve the estate (or corpus of the trust); and
- the amount and regularity of income.

The application of these general principles depends on the type of account administered. The prudent man rule continues to be the prevailing statute in a small number of states, in particular with regard to investments permitted by mutually-chartered institutions such as savings banks and insurance companies.

== Investment choices ==
The prudent man rule requires that each investment be judged on its own merits and that speculative or risky investments must be avoided. Under the prudent man rule, certain types of investments, such as second mortgages or new business ventures, are viewed as intrinsically speculative and therefore prohibited as fiduciary investments. As with any fiduciary relationship, margin accounts and short selling of uncovered securities are also prohibited.

In contrast with the modern Prudent Investor Rule, isolated investments in a portfolio may be imprudent on individual merits at the time of acquisition, however, as a part of a portfolio, the investment could be prudent. Thus, a fiduciary may not be held liable for a loss in one investment.

== Trend ==
Since the prudent man rule was last revised in 1959, numerous investment products have been introduced or have come into the mainstream. For example, in 1959, there were 155 mutual funds with nearly $16 billion in assets. By year-end 2000, mutual funds had grown to 10,725, with $6.9 trillion in assets. In addition, investors have become more sophisticated and are more attuned to investments since the last revision of the Rule. As these two concepts converged, the prudent man rule became less relevant. This discounting of the relevance of the prudent man rule is more the result of market forces than it is of the needs of individuals for "safety of capital". The 10,000+ mutual funds of 2000 have grown to over 15,000 mutual funds in 2006.

The prudent man rule in its broader interpretations implies that the fiduciary should perform enough due diligence to ensure that the company meets the investment needs of the investors. Typical due diligence includes discussions with management, vendors and customers, as well as proper evaluation of any risk factors that might affect the performance of the company or its securities.

The modern interpretation of the "prudent man rule" goes beyond the assessment of each asset individually to include the concept of due diligence and diversification. This is sometimes referred to as the "Prudent Investor Rule". The logic is this: an asset may be too risky to put all your money in (thus failing the prudent man rule) but may still be very diversifying and therefore beneficial in a small proportion of the total portfolio.

== See also ==
- Bartlett v Barclays Bank Trust Co Ltd
- Man on the Clapham omnibus
- Re Whiteley
