= Thomas Putnam =

English accuser in the Salem witch trials

- Born: March 22, 1652 [O.S. March 12, 1651] (Note: Contemporary court records, which used the Julian calendar and the Annunciation Style of enumerating months and years, recorded his birth as 12:1m:1652, indicating the twelfth day of the first month (March) of Old Style 1651, New Style 1652. For further useful reading, see: Old Style and New Style dates; Dual dating); Salem Village, Massachusetts Bay Colony
- Died: 24 May 1699 (aged 47); Salem Village, Province of Massachusetts Bay
- Known for: Accuser in the Salem witch trials
- Spouse: Ann Putnam (née Carr)
- Children: 12, including Ann Putnam
- Parents: Thomas Putnam Sr. (1614–1686); Ann Putnam (née Holyoke)

Thomas Putnam (March 22, 1652 [O.S. March 12, 1651] – June 3 [O.S. May 24], 1699) was a member of the Putnam family, a resident of Salem Village (present-day Danvers, Massachusetts, United States) and a significant accuser in the notorious 1692 Salem witch trials.

== Biography ==
Thomas Putnam was born on March 22, 1652 (new style March 12, 1651) in Salem Village, Massachusetts Bay Colony, a son of Lieutenant Thomas Putnam Sr. (1615–1686) and his first wife, Ann Holyoke. He was baptized on February 16, 1652, at the First Church of Salem. He married Ann Carr on September 25, 1675, at Salem Village. Ann was born at Salem Village on June 15, 1661, the youngest daughter of George and Elizabeth Carr. They had twelve children: Ann Jr., Thomas, Elizabeth, Ebenezer, Deliverance, Timothy, Experience, Abigail, Susanna and Seth; two who died young. Thomas served in the military and held the rank of Sergeant, fighting in King Philip's War. He also served as parish clerk.

Despite being the son of one of Salem's wealthiest residents, Putnam was excluded from major inheritances by both his father and father-in-law. His half-brother, Joseph, who had benefited most from their father's estate, married into the rival Porter family in Salem Town, fueling ill will between the clans. Putnam, his wife Ann, and their daughter Ann Jr. all levied accusations of witchcraft, many of them against extended members of the Porter family, and testified at the trials. Putnam was responsible for the accusations of 43 people, and his daughter was responsible for 62.

Both Putnam and his wife died in 1699, leaving their ten children orphans, two children having predeceased them.

== Arthur Miller's The Crucible ==
In Arthur Miller's 1953 play, The Crucible, Thomas Putnam is married to Ann Putnam, and together have a daughter, Ruth Putnam, who is afflicted with a grave illness, similar to that of Betty Parris. They both have lost seven children in childbirth and point to witchcraft as the cause of it. Putnam appears in Act 1 and is apparent during Act 3. He manipulates Reverend Parris into taking his side, urging him to see that it is witchcraft that is making Salem go mad. He uses the witch trials to get the other villagers' land, such as Giles Corey's. Giles later takes Putnam to court regarding the issue.
