= Ann Putnam =

Witness in the Salem Witch Trials (1679–1716)

Ann Putnam Jr
- Born: April 24, 1679; Salem Village, Massachusetts Bay Colony
- Died: 1716 (aged 36–37); Massachusetts Bay Colony
- Known for: Accuser in the Salem witch trials
- Parents: Thomas Putnam (father); Ann (née Carr) Putnam (mother)
- Relatives: Israel Putnam; Rufus Putnam (cousins)

Ann Putnam Jr. (April 24, 1679 – 1716) was a primary accuser, at age 12, at the Salem Witch Trials of Massachusetts during the later portion of 17th-century Colonial United States. Born 1679 in Salem Village, Essex County, Massachusetts Bay Colony, she was the eldest child of Thomas (1652–1699) and Ann (Née Carr) Putnam (1661–1699).

She was friends with some of the girls who claimed to be afflicted by witchcraft and, in March 1692, proclaimed to be afflicted herself, along with Elizabeth Hubbard, Mary Walcott, Mercy Lewis, Abigail Williams, and Mary Warren. Putnam is responsible for the accusations of 62 people, which, along with the accusations of others, resulted in the executions of twenty people, as well as the deaths of several others in prison.

She was a first cousin once removed of Generals Israel and Rufus Putnam.

== Early life ==
Annie was born on April 24, 1679, to Thomas Putnam (of the Putnam family) and Ann (née Carr) Putnam, who had twelve children in total. Ann was the eldest. Fellow accuser Mercy Lewis was a servant in the Putnam household, and Mary Walcott was, perhaps, Annie's best friend. These three girls would become the first afflicted girls outside of the Parris household.

The Putnam family lived on the southwest side of Hathorne Hill, approximately in the area of what is today Danielle Drive in Danvers, Massachusetts. (For many years, a house that stands back from Putnam Lane was misidentified as the Putnam House, but this house was likely built circa 1891. Images of this house are still routinely misidentified as Annie's home). Shortly after the trials were over, the family built a new house in the general area of what is today Dayton and Maple Streets in Danvers where Annie spent the rest of her life.

== Salem witch trials ==
Annie, age 12, was one of the "afflicted girls", the primary accusers during the trials.

== Aftermath ==
According to historian of the Salem Witch Trials Charles W. Upham, and implied by her own will, Annie was chronically ill in the years after the trials, and that led to her death at a young age.

It seems she was frequently the subject of sickness, and her bodily powers much weakened. The probability is, that the long-continued strain kept upon her muscular and nervous organization, during the witchcraft scenes, had destroyed her constitution. Such interrupted and vehement exercises, to their utmost tension, of the imaginative, intellectual, and physical powers, in crowded and heated rooms, before the public gaze, and under the feverish and consuming influence of bewildering and all but delirious excitement, could hardly fail to sap the foundations of health in so young a child. The tradition is, that she had a slow and fluctuating decline. The language of her will intimates, that, at intervals, there were apparent checks to her disease, and rallies of strength, – ‘oftentimes sick and weak in body.’ She inherited from her mother a sensitive and fragile constitution; but her father, although brought to the grave, probably by the terrible responsibilities and trials in which he had been involved, at a comparatively early age, belonged to a long-lived race and neighborhood. The opposite elements of her composition struggled in a protracted contest – on the one side, a nature morbidly subject to nervous excitability sinking under the exhaustion of an overworked, overburdened, and shattered system; on the other, tenacity of life. The conflict continued with alternating success for years; but the latter gave way at last. Her story, in all its aspects, is worth of the study of the psychologist. Her confession, profession, and death point the moral.

— Charles Wentworth Upham

When both her parents died in 1699, Putnam was left to raise her nine surviving siblings. She never married.

In consultation with the Reverend Joseph Green, Samuel Parris's successor as minister of Salem's church, Putnam composed a public confession for the part she had played in the witch trials. Rebecca Nurse's son Samuel Nurse was conferred with, "as the representative of those who had suffered from her testimony", and he deemed the confession "to be satisfactory to him." Putnam wished to offer her confession and profess her religion at the same time. The date of the confession was made public, and on 25 August, 1706, at the Salem meeting-house, a large congregation from Salem and other places assembled. Green read Putnam's confession while the congregation sat and Putnam stood in her place:

I desire to be humbled before God for that sad and humbling providence that befell my father's family in the year about ninety-two; that I, then being in my childhood, should, by such a providence of God, be made an instrument for the accusing of several people for grievous crimes, whereby their lives was taken away from them, whom, now I have just grounds and good reason to believe they were innocent persons; and that it was a great delusion of Satan that deceived me in that sad time, whereby I justly fear I have been instrumental, with others, though ignorantly and unwittingly, to bring upon myself and this land the guilt of innocent blood; though, what was said or done by me against any person, I can truly and uprightly say, before God and man, I did it not out of any anger, malice, or ill will to any person, for I had no such thing against one of them; but what I did was ignorantly, being deluded by Satan.
And particularly, as I was a chief instrument of accusing Goodwife Nurse and her two sisters, I desire to lie in the dust, and to be humble for it, in that I was a cause, with others, of so sad a calamity to them and their families; for which cause I desire to lie in the dust, and earnestly beg forgiveness of God, and from all those unto whom I have given just cause of sorrow and offense, whose relations were taken away or accused.

After the reading, Putnam declared it was her confession, acknowledged her signature, and received Communion. Of her confession, Upham stated that "she was undoubtedly sincere in her penitence, and was forgiven, we trust and believe; but she failed to see the depths of her iniquity, and of those who instigated and aided her, in her false accusations. The blame and the deed were wholly hers and theirs. Satan had no share in it."

== Death ==
She died in 1716 and is buried with her parents in an unmarked grave in Danvers, Massachusetts. Her will entered probate on June 29, 1716, so she presumably died shortly before then. In it, she refers to eight surviving siblings. Her four brothers inherited the land she had inherited from her parents, and her personal estate was divided between her four sisters.

== In popular culture ==
In Arthur Miller's play The Crucible, her character's name is Ruth, to avoid confusion with her mother, Ann Putnam (Sr.)

Conversion by Katherine Howe describes the mass hysteria of the fictional St. Joan's Academy in Danvers, Massachusetts, interlaced with intercalary chapters from Annie's perspective as she tells the town's new reverend how the witch hunt began and escalated based on her testimony and the testimonies of the other girls. The novel explores the occurrence of modern-day hysteria through juxtaposition against the Salem Witch Trials.

== Sources ==
- Biography of Ann Putnam Jr., umkc.edu; accessed December 23, 2014.
- Upham, Charles W. (2000) [1867], Salem Witchcraft, vol. 2, Dover Publications, ISBN 0-486-40899-X
