= Filburn v People's Palace and Aquarium Co Ltd =

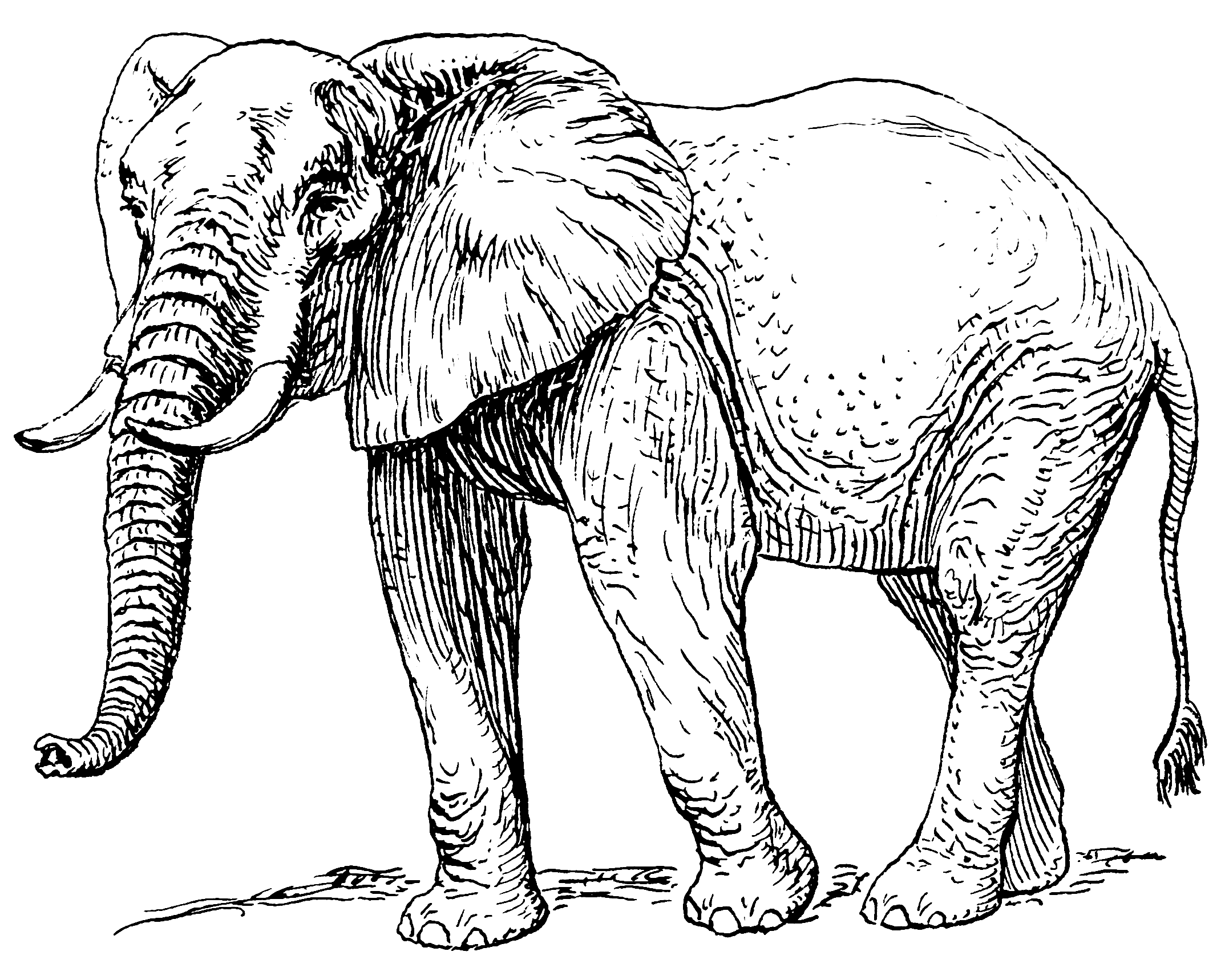
The court in Filburn declared that elephants belong to a category of wild animals, the ownership of which invites strict liability

Filburn v People's Palace and Aquarium Co Ltd, 25 Q.B. Div. 258 (1890), was an English case before the Queen's Bench that imposed strict liability upon owners of wild animals for harm caused by them.

== Facts ==
The plaintiff was injured by an elephant kept by the defendant in its amusement park.

== Legal issue ==
Was the defendant responsible for the damage to the plaintiff?

== Decision ==
The plaintiff suffered personal injuries after being attacked by an elephant owned and exhibited by the defendants. The court ruled that a person keeps wild animals at their own peril, and that it is their responsibility to keep the animal from doing harm to others under all circumstances (a strict liability standard).
