= Learoyd v Whiteley =

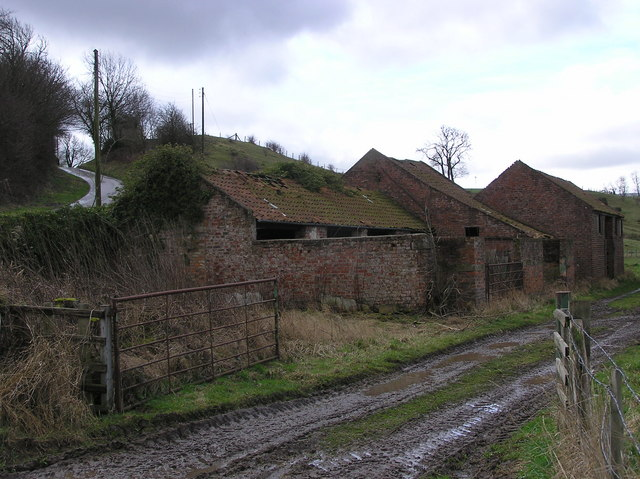
- Court: House of Lords
- Decided: 1 August 1887
- Citations: [1887] UKHL 1, (1887) 12 AC 727

Case history
- Prior action: (1886) LR 33 Ch D 347

Case opinions
- Lord Halsbury LC, Lord Watson, Lord FitzGerald

Learoyd v Whiteley [1887] UKHL 1 is an English trusts law case, concerning the duty of care owed by a trustee when exercising the power of investment.

== Facts ==
Elizabeth Whiteley and her children sued the executors of Benjamin Whiteley's will (of 19 March 1874). The will contained a power to invest the fund in certain investments, including “real securities in England or Wales.” £5,000 of the trust money had been lost. £3,000 was invested in a mortgage at 5% return in the freehold of a ten-acre brick field near Pontefract, “with the engine-house, sheds, brick and pipe kilns, and buildings thereon, and all fixtures and fittings thereon.” £2,000 was invested on mortgages at 5% in four small freehold houses, including a shop, in Salford, Lancashire. The brickfield owners went bankrupt in October 1884 and the owner of the four houses filed for petition for liquidation. There was insufficient money to pay the trust fund.

== Judgments ==
=== Chancery Court ===
Bacon VC held in the Chancery Court that the brickfield investment was unauthorised, and the trustees were responsible for its failure. The trustees failed to exercise sufficient caution, but they had done so in the case of the houses. The trustees appealed.

=== Court of Appeal ===
The Court of Appeal upheld Bacon VC's decision, that the trustees were liable for repayment of the £3,000 invested in the brickfield. They held that a trustee must exercise the standard of care of an ordinary prudent businessman, applying any special knowledge he may have. Cotton LJ stated,

As I understand it the rule is this. They must take such care in conducting the business of the trust as a reasonably cautious man would use, having regard, not only to the interests of those who are entitled to the income, but to the interests of those who will take in future. That is to say, it is not like a man simply investing his own money where his object may be a larger present income than he can get from a safer security; but trustees are bound to preserve the money for those entitled to the corpus in remainder, and they are bound to invest it in such a way as will produce a reasonable income for those enjoying the income for the present. And in doing so they must use such caution as a reasonably prudent man would with reference to transactions in which he may be engaged of a similar nature. In my opinion a trustee is not bound to have special knowledge. Where there is any special knowledge required, he may, and ought to consult those who could advise him from their special knowledge,—lawyers in the case of legal matters, and experts as to the value of property where there is any question as to the value of property. But I cannot accede to the view which Mr. Hemming pressed upon us so very much, that you must consider whether the trustee is or is not possessed of special skill and ability. If he likes to undertake the duty of a trustee (although I am not for my part at all inclined to bear hardly on a trustee who acts honestly) he must be dealt with as an ordinary man of ordinary intelligence. Having said that, let us look at what was done by the trustees as regards the investment on the brick-field.

Lindley LJ followed.

The principle applicable to cases of this description was stated by the late Master of the Rolls in Speight v Gaunt to be that a trustee ought to conduct the business of the trust in the same manner that an ordinary prudent man of business would conduct his own, and that beyond that there is no liability or obligation on the trustee. I accept this principle; but in applying it care must be taken not to lose sight of the fact that the business of the trustee, and the business which the ordinary prudent man is supposed to be conducting for himself, is the business of investing money for the benefit of persons who are to enjoy it at some future time, and not for the sole benefit of the person entitled to the present income. The duty of a trustee is not to take such care only as a prudent man would take if he had only himself to consider; the duty rather is to take such care as an ordinary prudent man would take if he were minded to make an investment for the benefit of other people for whom he felt morally bound to provide. That is the kind of business the ordinary prudent man is supposed to be engaged in; and unless this is borne in mind the standard of a trustee's duty will be fixed too low; lower than it has ever yet been fixed, and lower certainly than the House of Lords or this Court endeavoured to fix it in Speight v Gaunt.

Such being the principle, we have to apply it to this case, and to consider the two investments which the trustees made. One observation applies to both of them, viz., that the trustees acted bonâ fide, and obtained and acted on the advice of a solicitor and valuer who were apparently competent men in their respective professions. It was contended on behalf of the trustees that this circumstance alone was enough to exonerate the trustees from liability. But this contention goes too far. If it were to prevail the Court would in effect decide that trustees could delegate their trust to any competent persons, and so terminate their own responsibility. This, however, trustees cannot do. They may and must seek advice on matters they do not themselves understand; but in acting on advice given to them they must act with that prudence which I have already endeavoured to describe.

Now as regards the investment of the £3,000 on the brickfield, I cannot bring myself to say that the security was one which a prudent man, investing money with a view to preserve it for the benefit of others as well as of himself, would have lent money upon. As an abstract proposition I am not prepared to say that a freehold brick-field cannot be a real security within the meaning of the power. It would clearly be a real security within the power if the value of the land, apart from the particular trade carried on upon it, was sufficient to secure the sum advanced. But where, as here, the value of the land, apart from the particular trade of brick-making carried on upon it, is nothing like the sum advanced, the whole aspect of the case changes. The value of such a brickfield as a security for money lent on it in excess of the value of the land as land, depends on the trade of brick-making, and on the probability of a purchaser being found to buy and work the brick-field in the event of the mortgage money being called in. This depends on the state of the brick-making trade, and on the profits which can be made by selling bricks made in the field in question. Moreover a lender of money on such a security must exercise unusual vigilance in seeing that he does not allow the money to remain uncalled in longer than is safe. A security of so hazardous a nature as this, though in one sense and to some extent a real security, is not a proper security for trust money; it is not in truth a real security for any sum beyond the value of the land as land. The security for more than this value is the solvency of the borrower, and the trade carried on by him. No prudent man investing money for the benefit of himself and others, would, in my opinion, have invested so large a sum as £3000 upon so hazardous a security as this brick-field, even after receiving Mr. Utley's report. In my opinion, therefore, the Vice-Chancellor was right in holding the trustees responsible for the loss sustained by this investment.

As regards the investment of £2,000 on the four freehold houses in Earl Street, Lower Broughton, I am not prepared to say that an ordinary prudent man investing money for the benefit of others, as well as of himself, would not have advanced £2,000 on the security of these houses. The security in this case was ordinary house property. There was nothing exceptional or unusually hazardous in it. The rental exceeded the interest on the sum advanced. A building society had advanced more than £2,000 upon the houses, and an apparently competent valuer, consulted by the trustees, expressed his opinion to be that the houses were good security for £2,000. An ordinary prudent man having no special knowledge of the value of house property, might well act on this advice, and see no reason for distrusting it. Moreover, a further advance was obtained on these same houses from another quarter, and when put up for sale more than £2000 was bid for them. The sum bid was not enough to cover principal, interest, and costs, and was not therefore accepted. Under these circumstances, although the result has been unfortunate, I do not think it is made out that the trustees took less care than they ought when they made the investment. No other want of diligence was proved. As regards this investment, therefore, I also agree with the Vice-Chancellor.

Whilst on the one hand the Court ought not to encourage laxity and want of care, on the other hand the Court ought not to prevent people from becoming trustees by converting honest trustees into insurers of the moneys committed to their care. I have endeavoured to avoid both errors.

I agree with Lord Justice Cotton on the point as to interest on the £3,000 raised by Mr. Hemming . The tenant for life cannot be made to refund the interest paid to her, or to recoup the trustees the difference between 5 per cent. and 4 per cent.

In my judgment, therefore, both appeals ought to be dismissed.

Lopes LJ concurred.

=== House of Lords ===
Lord Halsbury LC affirmed the Court of Appeal. Lord Watson held that in administering and managing trust property (distinguished from the investment sphere),

As a general rule, the law requires of a trustee no higher degree of diligence than a man of ordinary prudence would exercise in the management of his own private affairs.

Lord Fitzgerald concurred.

== See also ==
- UK company law, Companies Act 2006, s 174
- Speight v Gaunt (1882) 22 Ch D 727, 739, Sir George Jessel MR, 'It seems to me that on general principles a trustee ought to conduct the business of the trust in the same manner that an ordinary prudent man of business would conduct his own, and that beyond that there is no liability or obligation on the trustee.'
- Belchier v Parsons (1754) 96 ER 908
