= Ann Putnam Senior =

17th c New Englander involved in Salem Witch Trials

Ann Putnam née Carr (15 June 1661 – 8 June 1699) is frequently referred to as "Ann Putnam Senior" to differentiate from her daughter of the same name, as both featured prominently in the Salem witch trials.

Born in Salisbury in the Massachusetts Bay Colony on 15 June 1661 to George, Sr. and Elizabeth (Dexter) Carr. She was their tenth and final child, the fourth daughter. On 15 Nov 1678, she married Thomas Putnam in Salem. The couple would have twelve children of their own before Ann died 8 June 1699. Thomas preceded her in death by only 15 days.

Described as a "woman of highly sensitive temperament, apparently easily overwrought upon and deceived"she would play an important role as an accuser and primary witness on the Salem Witch Trials.

Both Ann Sr. and Thomas are generally considered to be devout and true believers in the accusations well into the 1800s, but some claims of personal retribution have been made in the three hundred years since. "Certain members of the Putnam family had bitter disputes with other families, mainly over land, and one way for them to take revenge on anyone they took a dislike to was to accuse them of witchcraft. Others joined in and so the 'witchcraft hysteria' spread."

After the conclusion of the trials in spring 1693, Ann, Thomas, and Ann Junior were generally in poor health. This led to the premature death of the two eldest at aged 38 and 47, respectively. With two children predeceasing them, this left Ann Junior to raise her remaining nine siblings at the age of twenty, she would die aged 36.
