= Speight v Gaunt =

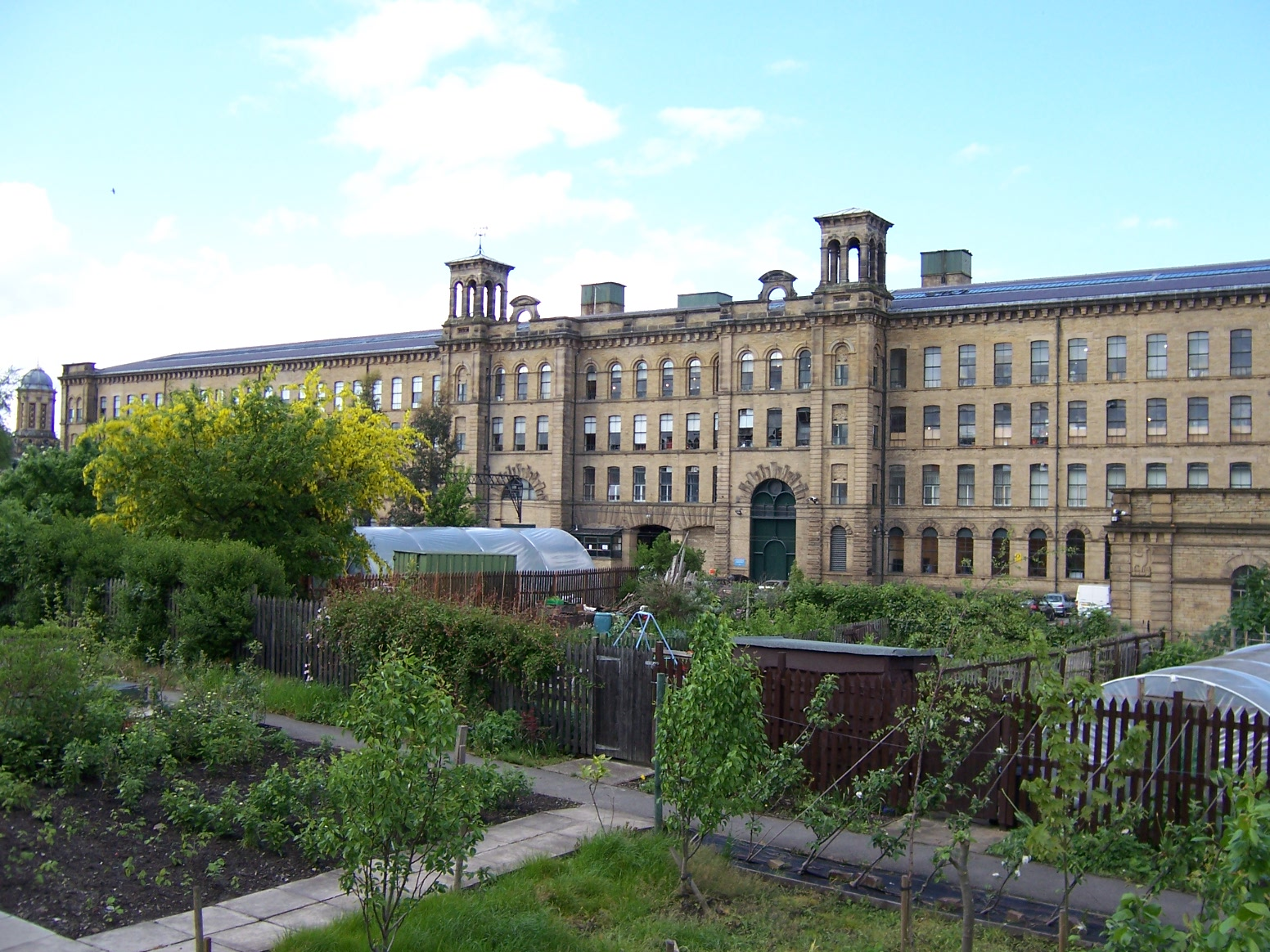
- Court: House of Lords
- Citations: [1883] UKHL 1, (1883-84) LR 9 App Cas 1

Case history
- Prior actions: [1883] EWCA Civ 1, (1883) 22 Ch D 727

Court membership
- Judges sitting: Earl of Selborne LC, Lord Blackburn, Lord Watson and Lord Fitzgerald

Speight v Gaunt [1883] UKHL 1 is an English trusts law case, concerning the extent of the duty of care owed by a fiduciary.

== Facts ==
Mr John Speight, a Bradford industrialist, had appointed Mr Isaac Gaunt and Mr Alfred Wilkinson as trustees for his estate in his will. The trustees employed a young broker, John Cooke, to invest £15,000 of the estate's money into company shares. The trustees gave over the money. The broker dishonestly took the money for himself, and gave excuses for the delays in getting the company shares. The truth only transpired when Cooke was declared bankrupt. The beneficiaries of Speight's trust sued Mr Gaunt for failing in his duty of care as a trustee.

== Judgment ==
=== Court of Appeal ===
Sir George Jessel MR held that because the trustee acted in the ordinary course of business, he was not liable to make good the loss occasioned by the embezzlement of the trust moneys by the broker. The key part of his judgment stated as follows.

In the first place, I think we ought to consider what is the liability of a trustee who undertakes an office which requires him to make an investment on behalf of his cestui que trust. It seems to me that on general principles a trustee ought to conduct the business of the trust in the same manner that an ordinary prudent man of business would conduct his own, and that beyond that there is no liability or obligation on the trustee. In other words, a trustee is not bound because he is a trustee to conduct business in other than the ordinary and usual way in which similar business is conducted by mankind in transactions of their own. It never could be reasonable to make a trustee adopt further and better precautions than an ordinary prudent man of business would adopt, or to conduct the business in any other way. If it were otherwise, no one would be a trustee at all. He is not paid for it. He says, “I take all reasonable precautions and all the precautions which are deemed reasonable by prudent men of business, and beyond that I am not required to go.” Now what are the usual precautions taken by men of business when they make an investment? If the investment is an investment made on the Stock Exchange through a stockbroker, the ordinary course of business is for the investor to select a stockbroker in good credit and in a good position, having regard to the sum to be invested, and to direct him to make the investment—that is, to purchase on the Stock Exchange of a jobber or another broker the investment required. In the ordinary course, all that the broker can do is to enter into a contract—usually it is for the next account-day. Of course you may, by special bargain, make it for cash or for any other day, but the ordinary course is for the next account-day. Before the account-day arrives the purchasing stockbroker requests his principal to pay him the money, because on the account day he is himself liable to pay over the money to the vendor, whether a jobber or broker, and therefore he must have it ready for the account-day, and according to the usual course of business he sends a copy of the purchasing note to the principal stating when the money is required to be paid, and he obtains the money from him a day or two before the account-day. When he gets it he pays it over, if it is a single transaction, to the vendor, and if it is one of a number of transactions he makes out an account with his vendor and pays over or receives from him the balance on the transactions. It by no means follows, therefore, that he pays over to the vendor the sum received, indeed there may be a number of transactions, and if the balance is the other way, then he has to receive money on the account, but he must in any case have the money in order to keep himself out of cash advances. It is after payment, and very often a considerable time after payment, that is several days, that he gets the securities perfected. If they are shares or stock in a company, or railway or other company, it may be a considerable time before the transfers are lodged at the office, and it is not until the matter is ready for completion that he gets the transfer and the certificates. But in all cases, except in the case of consols and a few other such stocks, there is some interval between the payment of the purchase-money and the obtaining of the security, or of the investment purchased.

Lindley LJ and Bowen LJ gave concurring judgments.

=== House of Lords ===
The House of Lords upheld the Court of Appeal. Lord Blackburn said the following:

The authorities cited by the late Master of the Rolls, I think shew that as a general rule a trustee sufficiently discharges his duty if he takes in managing trust affairs all those precautions which an ordinary prudent man of business would take in managing similar affairs of his own. There is one exception to this: a trustee must not choose investments other than those which the terms of his trust permit, though they may be such as an ordinary prudent man of business would select for his own money; and it may be that however usual it may be for a person who wishes to invest his own money, and instructs an agent, such as an attorney, or a stockbroker, to seek an investment, to deposit the money at interest with the agent till the investment is found, that is in effect lending it on the agent's own personal security, and is a breach of trust. No question as to this arises here, for Mr. Gaunt did nothing of that kind. Subject to this exception, as to which it is unnecessary to consider further, I think the case of Ex parte Belchier establishes the principle that where there is a usual course of business the trustee is justified in following it, though it may be such that there is some risk that the property may be lost by the dishonesty or insolvency of an agent employed.

The transactions of life could not be carried on without some confidence being bestowed. When the transaction consists in a sale where the vendor is entitled to keep his hold on the property till he receives the money, and the purchaser is entitled to keep his money till he gets the property, it would be in all cases inconvenient if the vendor and purchaser were required to meet and personally exchange the one for the other; when the parties are, as is very often the case, living remote from each other, it would be physically impossible.

Men of business practically ascertain how much confidence may be safely bestowed, or rather whether the inconvenience and hampering of trade which is avoided by this confidence is too heavy a premium for insurance against the risk thus incurred. When a loss such as that which occurred in Ex parte Belchier occurs from having bestowed such confidence, they doubtless re-consider all this; and when a new practice, such as that of making bankers' cheques payable to order and crossing them arises, as it has done within living memory, no doubt it is made use of in many cases to avoid incurring that risk, which was formerly practically inevitable. So that what was at one time the usual course, may at another time be no longer usual.

Judges and lawyers who see brought before them the cases in which losses have been incurred, and do not see the infinitely more numerous cases in which expense and trouble and inconvenience are avoided, are apt to think men of business rash. I think that the principle which Lord Hardwicke lays down is that, while the course is usual, a trustee is not to be blamed if he honestly, and without knowing anything that makes it exceptionally risky in his case, pursues that usual course. And I think that, independent of the high authority of Lord Hardwicke, this is founded on principle. It would be both unreasonable and inexpedient to make a trustee responsible for not being more prudent than ordinary men of business are.

== See also ==
- English trusts law
- Morley v Morley (1678) 2 Cases in Chancery 2, 22 ER 817, Lord Nottingham LC
