= DKW Junior =

DKW Junior DKW F11 / DKW F12
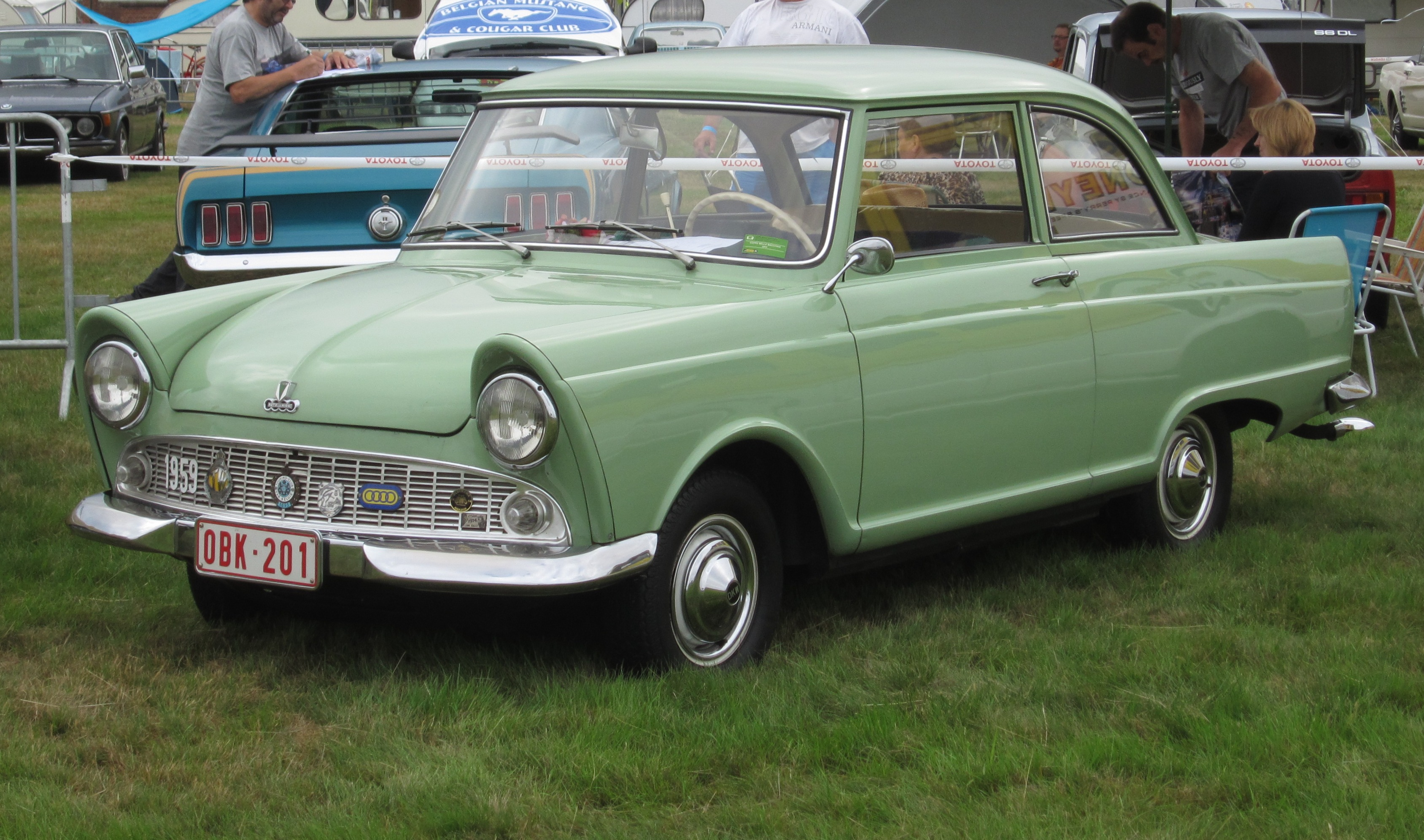
- 1959 DKW Junior

Overview
- Manufacturer: Auto Union AG
- Production: 1959–1963 (Junior); 1963–1965 (F11 / F12)
- Assembly: Düsseldorf, West Germany; Ingolstadt, West Germany

Body and chassis
- Body style: 2-door saloon 2-door cabriolet
- Layout: Front-engine, front-wheel-drive
- Related: Engine compartment was essentially reverse of standard layout, with the radiator mounted behind the engine, next to the firewall. A top mounted belt driven generator had a fan at the rear to provide airflow to the radiator. In winter, output from the radiator could be ducted into the cabin, providing excellent heating system. There was no water pump, with circulation between engine and radiator due to a "Thermo-syphon" flow.

Powertrain
- Engine: 741 cc two-stroke I3; 796 cc two-stroke I3; 889 cc two-stroke I3
- Transmission: 4-speed manual

Dimensions
- Wheelbase: 2,175 mm (85.6 in) Junior; 2,250 mm (89 in) F11/F12
- Length: 3,968 mm (156.2 in)
- Curb weight: 700–770 kg (1,540–1,700 lb) (empty)

Chronology
- Predecessor: Trabant P 50
- Successor: NSU Typ 110

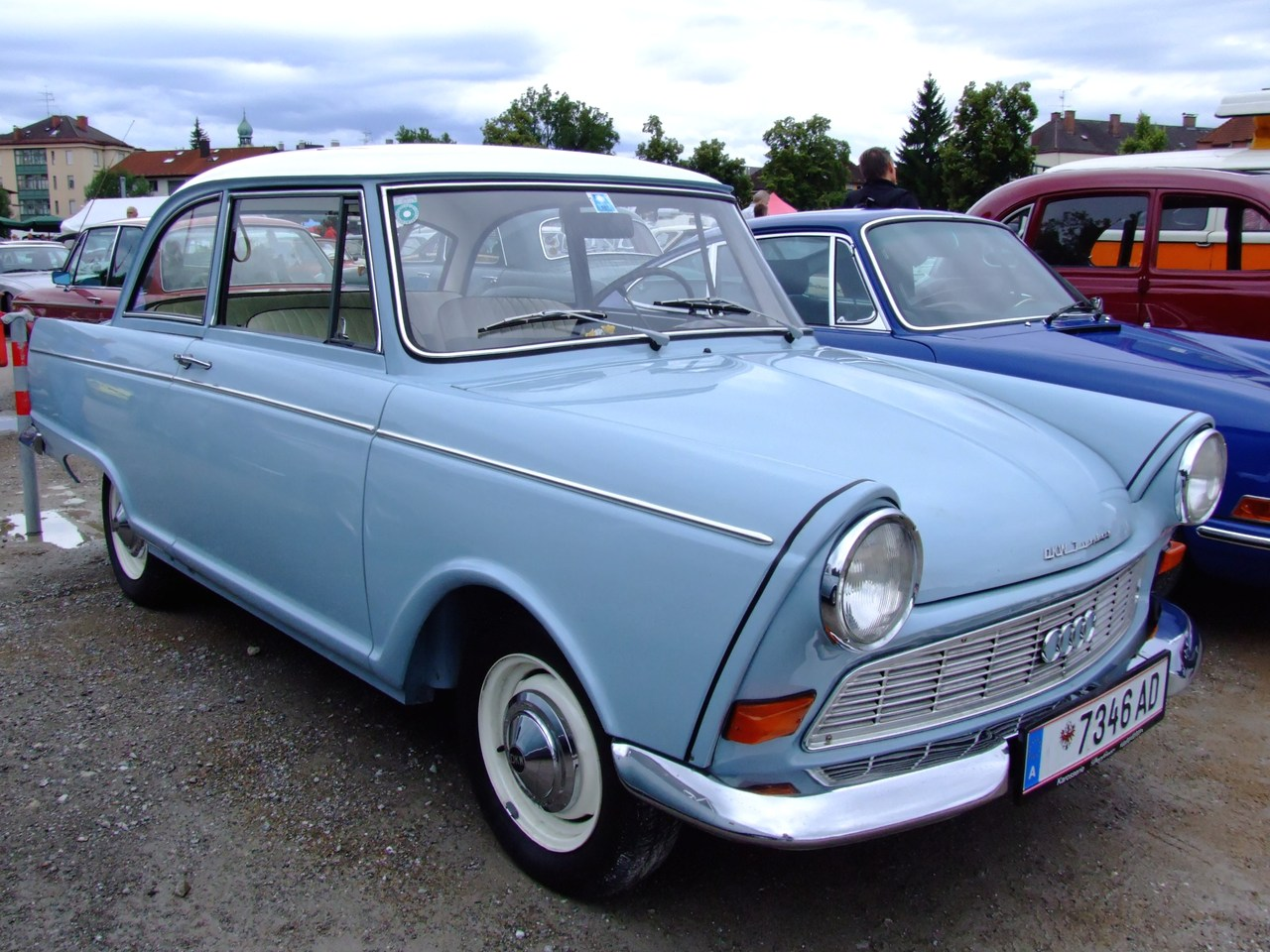
DKW Junior de luxe (F11/62) - the model between the "Urjunior" and F11/64

The DKW Junior is a small front wheel drive saloon manufactured by Auto Union AG. (DKW was founded 1916 by Jørgen Skafte Rasmussen, a Danish engineer in Germany. DKW originally stood for "Dampf-Kraft-Wagen", which is German for "steam-powered vehicle". In 1932, DKW merged with Audi, Horch, and Wanderer to form Auto Union AG and DKW became the small car and motorcycle brand within the group.) The car received a positive reaction when first exhibited, initially badged as the DKW 600, at the Frankfurt Motor Show in March 1957. The ‘Junior’ name was given to the (by now) DKW 750 in 1959 when the car went into volume production, but failed to survive an upgrade in January 1963, after which the car was known as the DKW F12. In addition to the saloon, a pretty ‘F12 Roadster’ (cabriolet version) was produced in limited numbers.

The car was known for its two-stroke engine. A number of European auto-makers produced two-stroke powered cars in the 1950s, but by the time the DKW Junior came along, the market was beginning to resist two-stroke powered cars as the industry increasingly standardised on four-stroke four-cylinder units which accordingly were becoming cheaper to produce. Two-stroke-engined cars were perceived by some as rough and noisy by comparison.

In terms of its size and pricing, the DKW Junior slotted into the range just below the Auto Union 1000, which itself underwent an upgrade and a name change (from DKW to Auto Union) in 1957. The Junior was therefore from its introduction until August 1963 the only DKW branded car.

== Design ==
The Auto Union 1000 had a form that closely followed that of a prototype first presented in 1938. In contrast, the smaller Junior had an uncompromisingly modern ponton, three-box design, filled out to the corners and featuring tail fins which were just beginning to appear on one or two of Europe's more fashionable designs at this time.

Despite its modern shape, the body sat on a separate chassis.

== Chronology ==
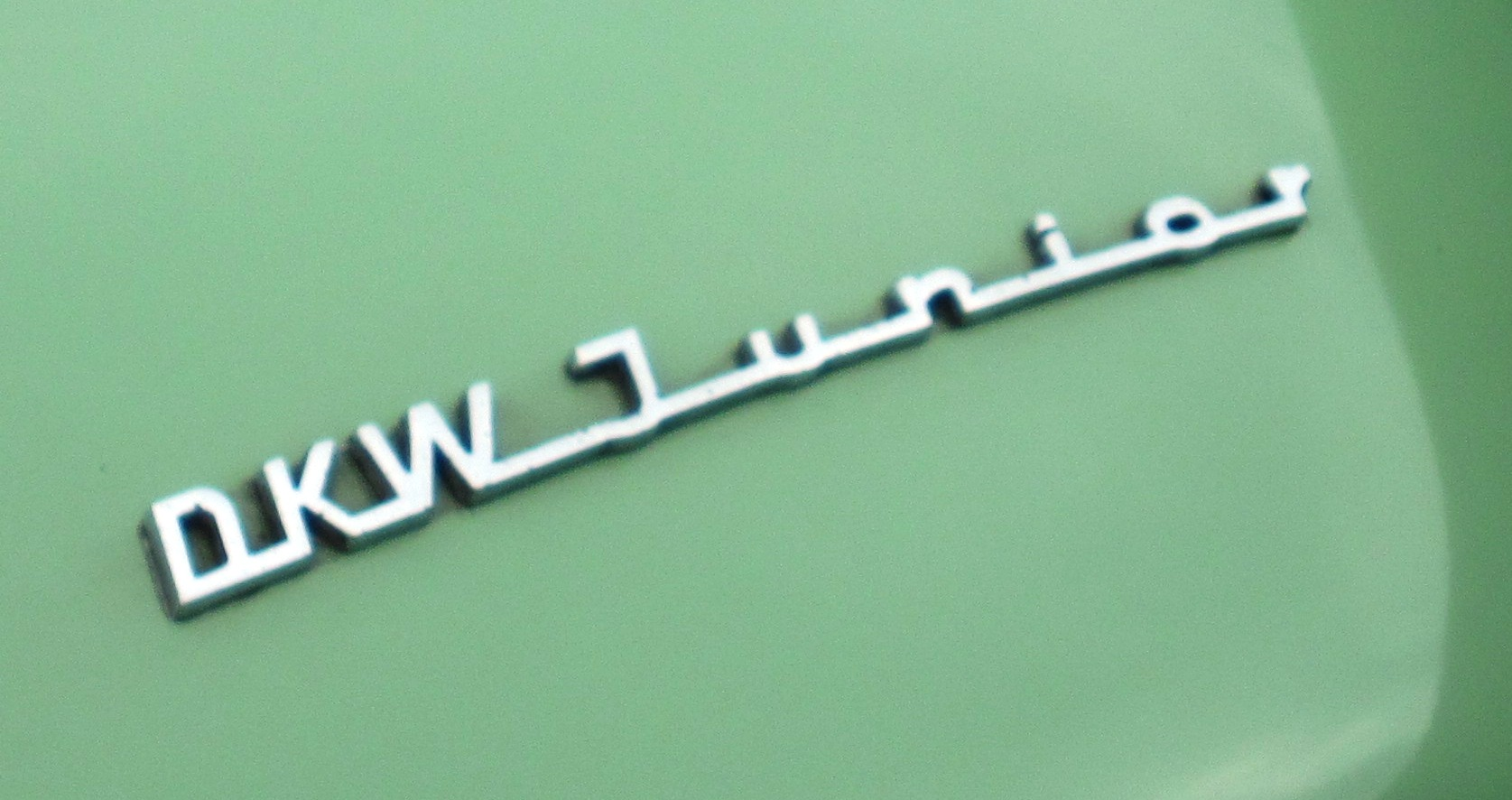
The name

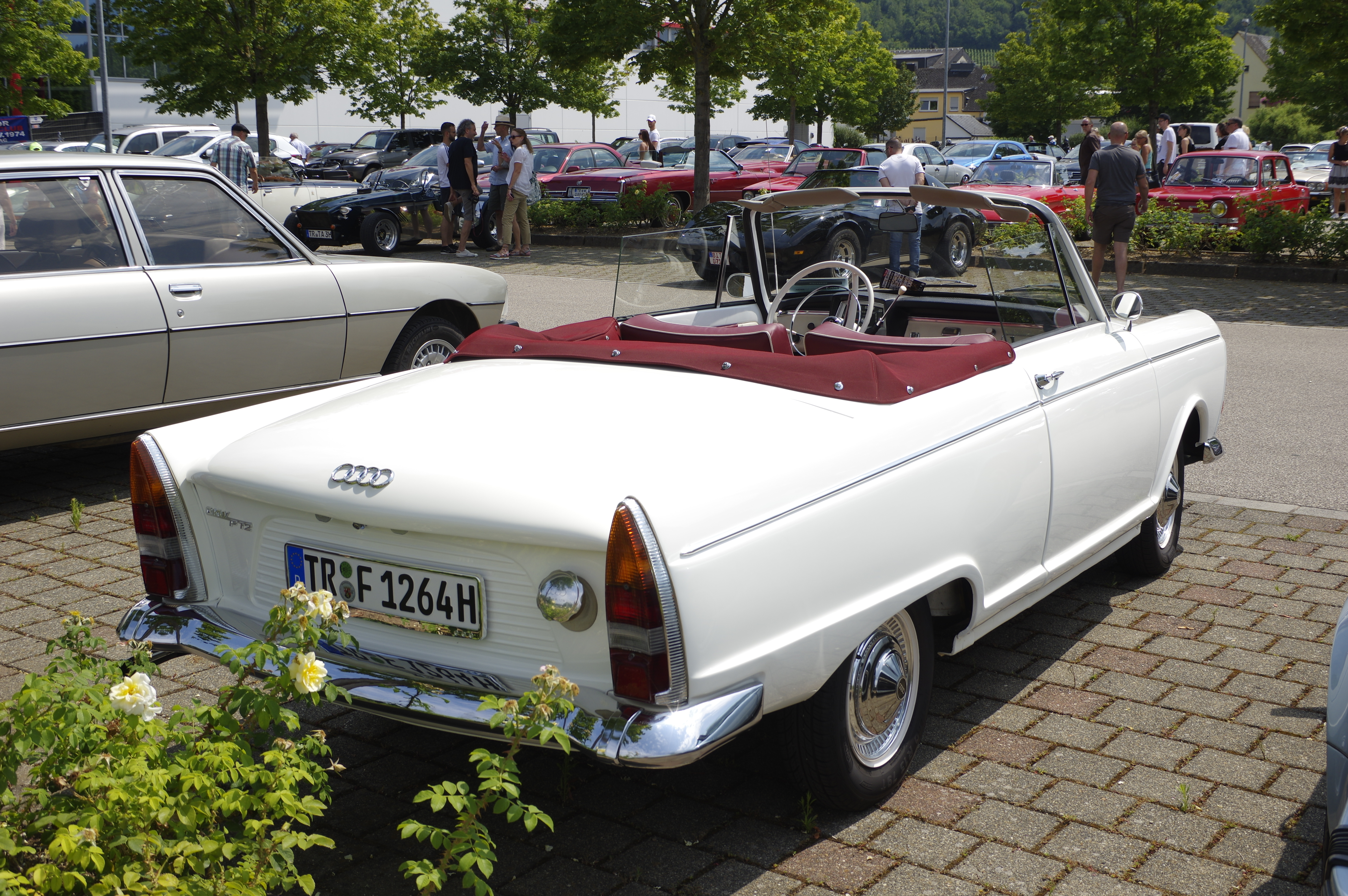
The DKW F12 Roadster featured a body built by Baur in Stuttgart

The DKW Junior prototype exhibited in 1957 featured a two-cylinder 660 cc two-stroke engine reminiscent of the two-stroke engine last seen in the DKW F89 Meisterklasse phased out in 1953.

A new plant was constructed at the company's Ingolstadt location for production of the car (DKWs having been assembled since the war till now at Düsseldorf), and by the time the Junior went into production, the prototype's engine had been replaced by a three-cylinder two-stroke unit of 741 cc for which an output of 34 bhp (25 kW) was claimed. The four speed manual transmission was controlled via a cable linkage using a column mounted gear lever.

In 1961 the DKW Junior retailed for 4790 Marks in Germany It offered more luggage space and a wider cabin than the market leading Volkswagen Beetle, and customers willing to pay an extra 160 Marks for the optional heater had the advantage in winter of a car that warmed up much more rapidly than the Volkswagen with its air-cooled power unit.

It is not clear whether the DKW Junior de Luxe, introduced in 1961, was intended to replace or to complement the original Junior which, in any case, was withdrawn in 1962. The Junior de Luxe had its cylinders bored out: total displacement was now 796 cc. Claimed power output was unchanged but the torque was marginally increased and the wheel size grew from 12 to 13 inches. Claimed maximum speed increased from 114 to 116 km/h (71 to 72 mph).

In January 1963 the Junior De Luxe was replaced by the DKW F12. Outwardly there was little change, but the C pillar became more angular and the engine was enlarged to 889 cc which was reflected by a claimed increase in output to 40 bhp (30 kW). Apart from the engines, the big news from the F12 involved the brakes: the F12 was the first car in this class to be equipped with front disc brakes. Although the DKW F12 was enthusiastically received by the motoring press, its sales were constrained in some countries by high import duties. In July 1965, the F11 and F12 retailed for £998 and £1198 respectively in New Zealand.

"MOTORMAN" magazine in New Zealand also described the car in July 1965 thus - "The DKW F12 in standard trim is a pleasant car offering quiet and comfortable motoring with excellent amenities. It is rapid for its size and has proved a very reliable conveyance over long distances."

"CAR" magazine in South Africa described the car thus in March 1964 - "By making some subtle changes to the Junior, the manufacturers have succeeded in producing a car in the F12 which is substantially different. It has many features which set it apart from the run of light cars and some ways is something of an aristocrat in its field".

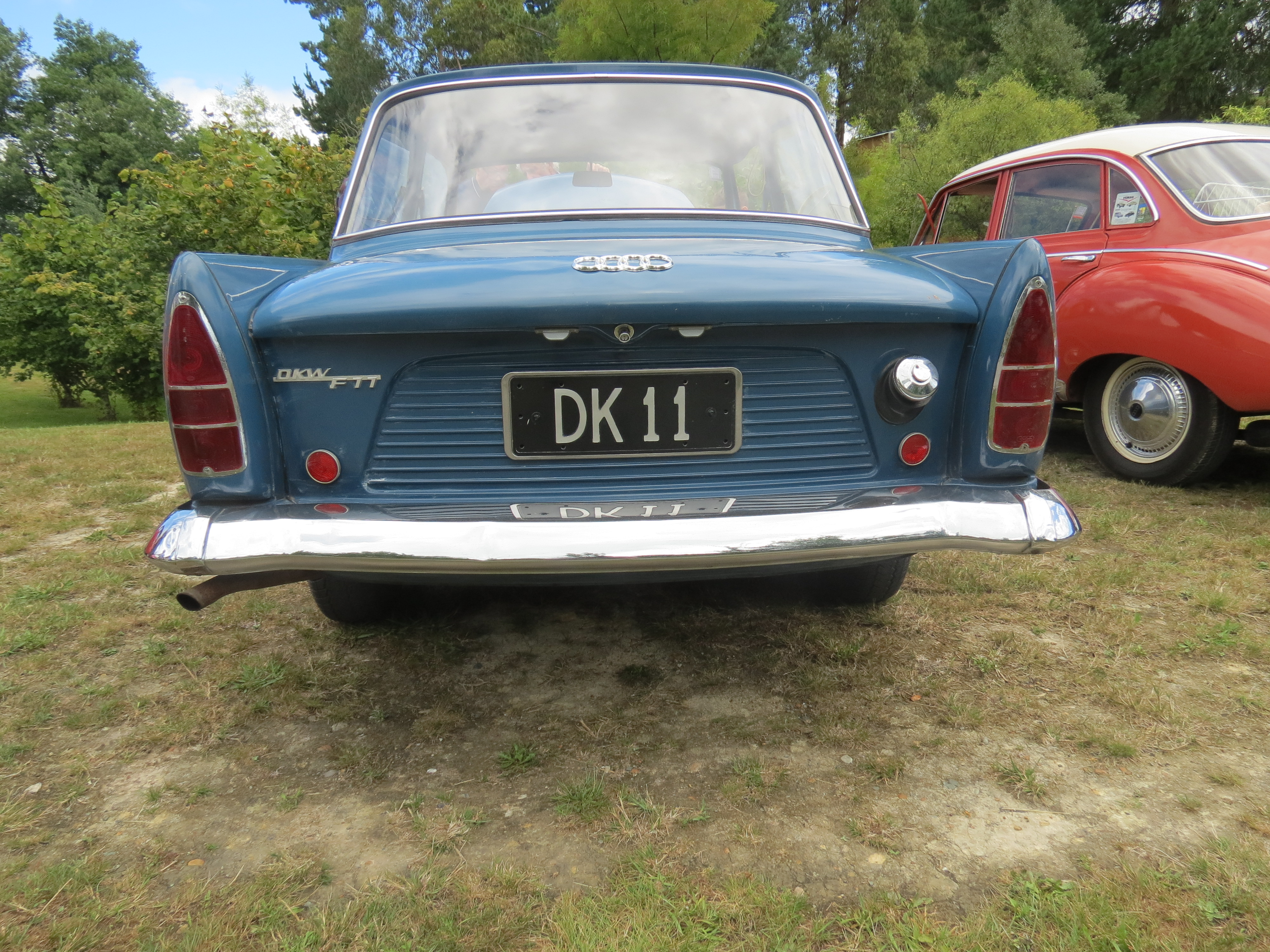
The DKW F11/64, was a reduced-specification version of the DKW F12, featuring the same body, with minor changes, including a carry over of the tail lights of the DKW Junior de Luxe.

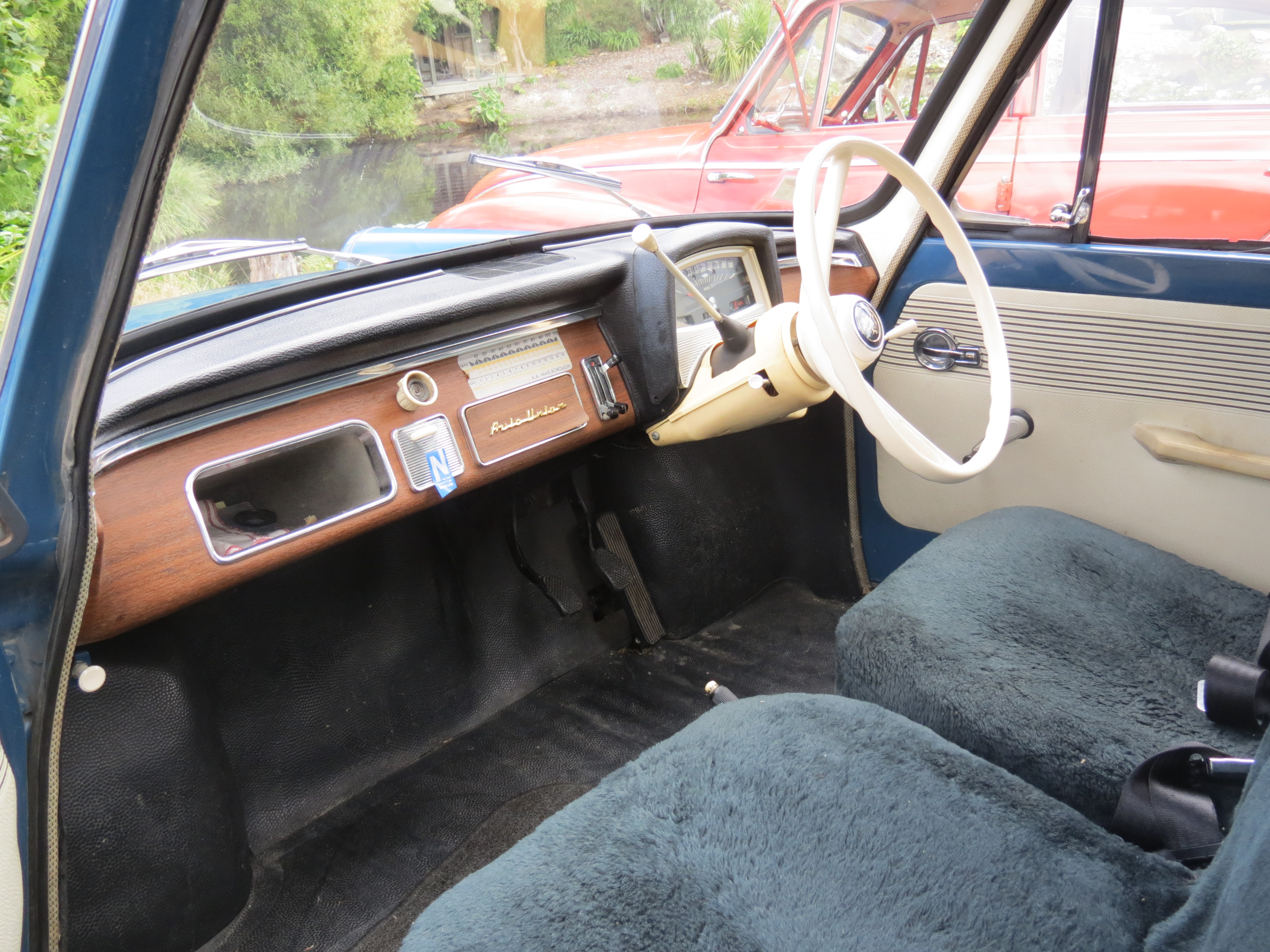
The interior of a right hand drive 1965 DKW F11/64 in New Zealand

In August the Junior's 796 cc engine reappeared in the DKW F11 which was in effect a reduced specification F12.

The DKW F12 roadster which appeared in 1964 extracted 45 bhp (34 kW) from its 889 cc three-cylinder engine, and this more powerful unit became available in the F12 saloon for a few months from February 1965.

== End of production ==
Early in the summer of 1965 Volkswagen acquired the Auto Union business from Daimler Benz: production of the two-stroke DKWs was almost immediately terminated. In the market place the DKWs had been facing an increasing struggle to compete with similarly sized more powerful four-stroke-engined offerings from Volkswagen and, more recently, Opel. By the end of 1965 the plant formerly controlled by Auto Union was building Audi badged cars, with four-cylinder four-stroke engines designed, before the change of ownership, in collaboration with Mercedes-Benz.

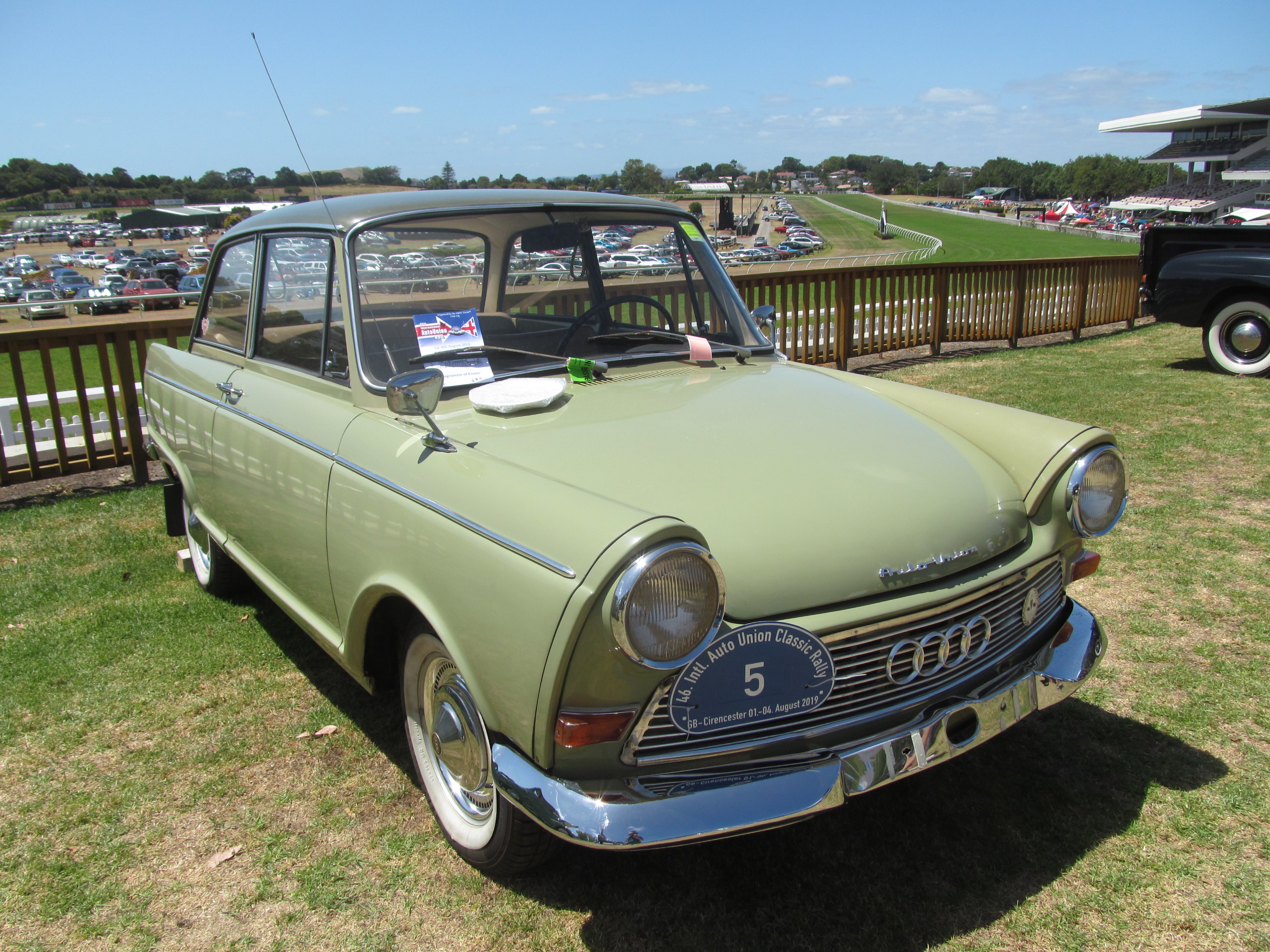
The DKW F12 de luxe was the last of the line, featuring the 45hp engine of the F12 Roadster.

== Specifications ==
Technical data DKW Junior & DKW F11/F12 (Manufacturer's figures except where stated)
DKW	Junior 2-door saloon	Junior de Luxe 2-door saloon	F11 2-door saloon	F12 2-door saloon	F12 Roadster 2-door cabriolet	F12 (45PS) 2-door saloon
Produced:	1959–1962	1961–1963	1963–1965	1963–1965	1964	1965
Engine:	3-cylinder-inline engine (two-stroke), front-mounted					
Valvegear:	None					
Cooling:	Water					
Bore x Stroke:	68 mm x 68 mm	70.5 mm x 68 mm	70.5 mm x 68 mm	74.5 mm x 68 mm	74.5 mm x 68 mm	74.5 mm x 68 mm
Displacement:	741 cc	796 cc	796 cc	889 cc	889 cc	889 cc
Max. Power bhp (DIN) / PS:	34	34	34	40	45	45
= kW:	25	25	25	29	33	33
@ rpm:	4300	4300	4300	4300	4500	4500
Max. Torque	63.8 N⋅m (47.1 lb⋅ft)	71.1 N⋅m (52.4 lb⋅ft)	71.1 N⋅m (52.4 lb⋅ft)	78.5 N⋅m (57.9 lb⋅ft)	78.5 N⋅m (57.9 lb⋅ft)	78.5 N⋅m (57.9 lb⋅ft)
@ rpm:	2500	2500	2500	2250	2500	2500
Compression Ratio:	7 : 1	8 : 1	7.25 : 1	7 : 1	7.25 : 1	7.25 : 1
Transmission:	Four speed Manual transmission: Column mounted gear lever: Front wheel drive					
Tyre size:	5.20 - 12"	5.50-13"	5.50-13"	5.50-13"	5.50-13"	5.50-13"
Electrical system:	6 volt					
Dry weight:	700 kg (1,500 lb)	710 kg (1,570 lb)	730 kg (1,610 lb)	750 kg (1,650 lb)	940 kg (2,070 lb)	970 kg (2,140 lb)
Loaded weight:	1,080 kg (2,380 lb)	1,095 kg (2,414 lb)	1,120 kg (2,470 lb)	1,120 kg (2,470 lb)	1,020 kg (2,250 lb)	1,140 kg (2,510 lb)
Track front/ rear:	1,180 mm (46 in) / 1,210 mm (48 in)		1,200 mm (47 in) / 1,280 mm (50 in)			
Wheelbase:	2,175 mm (85.6 in)		2,250 mm (89 in)			
Length:	3,965 mm (156.1 in)	3,968 mm (156.2 in)				
Width:	1,575 mm (62.0 in)					
Height:	1,430 mm (56 in)	1,440 mm (57 in)	1,453 mm (57.2 in)		1,375 mm (54.1 in)	1,453 mm (57.2 in)
