= M118 =

M118 may refer to:

- M-118 (Michigan highway), a state highway
- Mercedes-Benz M118 engine, an automobile engine
- 7.62×51mm NATO, a rifle cartridge called M118
- Mark 118 bomb, an American general purpose bomb
- M118, a US military semi trailer
