= DKW F102 =

Car model

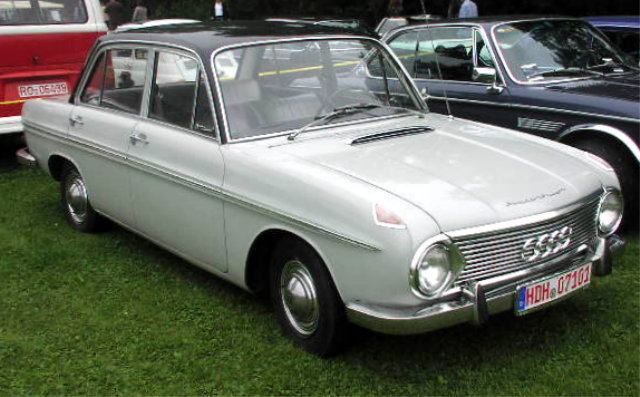

Overview
- Manufacturer: Auto Union GmbH
- Production: 1963–1966; 53,053 produced
- Assembly: Ingolstadt, West Germany

Body and chassis
- Class: Large family car (D)
- Body style: 2-door saloon 4-door saloon
- Layout: FF layout

Powertrain
- Engine: 1175 cc straight-3 two-stroke
- Transmission: 4-speed manual all-synchromesh

Dimensions
- Wheelbase: 2,499 mm (98.4 in)
- Length: 4,280 mm (169 in)
- Width: 1,618 mm (63.7 in)
- Height: 1,449 mm (57.0 in)
- Curb weight: 910 kg (2,010 lb) - 945 kg (2,083 lb)

Chronology
- Predecessor: Auto Union 1000
- Successor: Audi F103

The DKW F102 is a passenger car that was produced from August 1963 to 1966 by the German manufacturer Auto Union. Superseding the Auto Union 1000, it was the last model branded as a DKW by the manufacturer and also one of the last West German production cars equipped with a two-stroke engine, the last being the Goggomobil.

== General ==
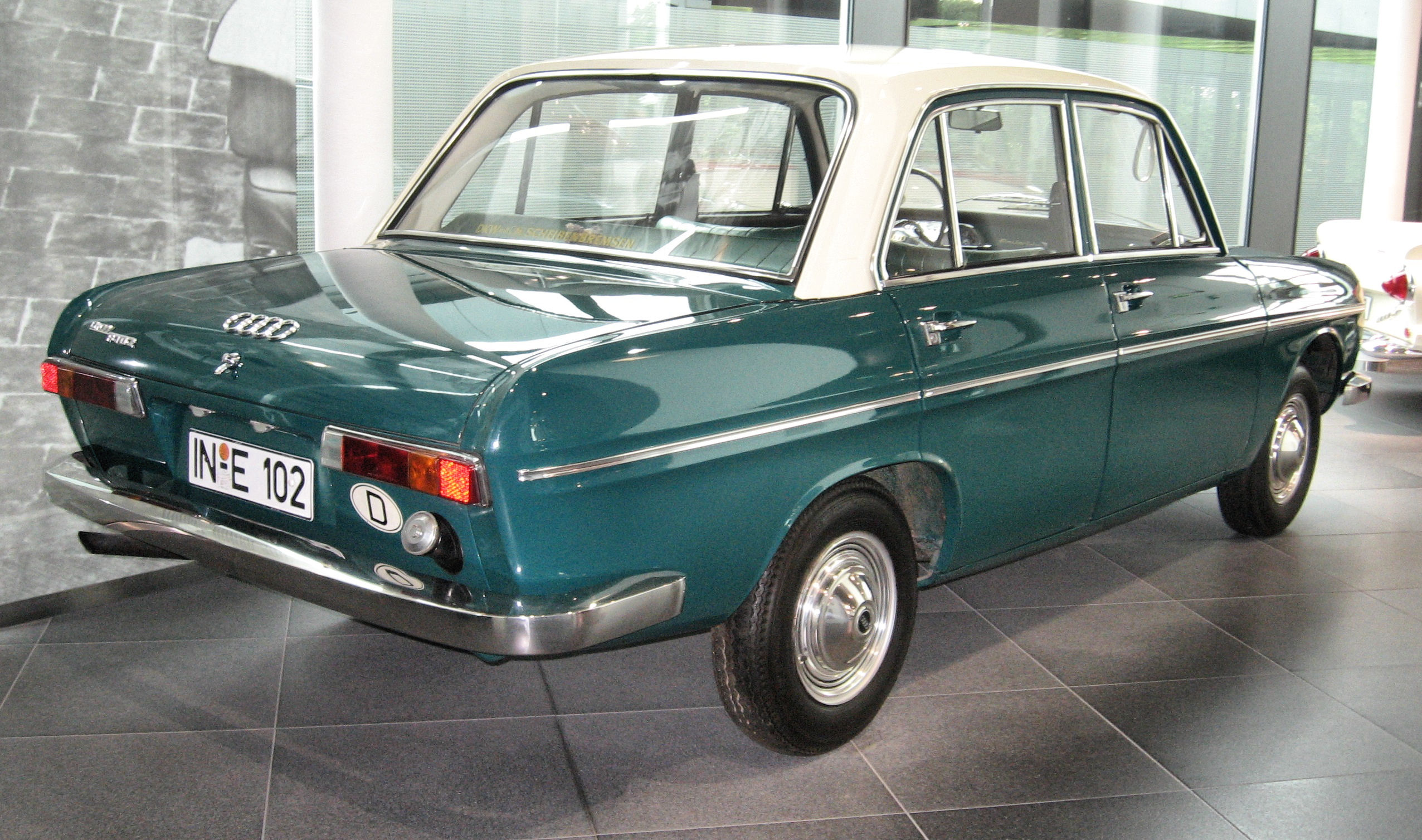
DKW F 102 four-door sedan at the Audi museum mobile

The last European built Auto Union 1000 and 1000S models were produced in July 1963 and the DKW F102 was presented as a replacement model in September 1963.

The F102 was initially available as a two-door sedan from March 1964 with four door cars joining them on the production line in January 1965. While the design of its predecessor, the Auto Union 1000, essentially came from the late 1930s, the F102 was a newly designed vehicle with a unibody and - in keeping with contemporary taste - with large glass surfaces and little chrome. The new price of the two-door sedan was DM 7,200.

The vehicle has a front suspension on double wishbones with torsion bars. The rigid rear axle hangs on trailing arms and is sprung by a transverse torsion bar. If the compression is uneven, the axle beam twists and acts as a stabilizer. A Panhard rod is used for lateral location.

Since the axle takes up a lot of space, the fuel tank is housed behind it in the floor of the boot, whilst the spare wheel is located behind the rear seat back.

Like its predecessors, the F102 was equipped with what was then a state-of-the-art two-stroke straight-three engine. The two-stroke mixture was generated by the new "fresh oil system" developed jointly with Bosch, which automatically mixes the lubricant with the gasoline from a separate oil tank in the engine compartment, which simplified refueling and reduced oil consumption. The driver could fill up with pure gasoline with no added oil.

=== Release and problems ===
While the DKW Junior was still the most successful small car in West Germany at the time, customers started to find the two-stroke engine to be inconvenient and generally outdated. This led to F102 not achieving the sales figures that the company had hoped for and caused Auto Union serious economic problems.

The causes of this quite abrupt loss of image included problems with the automatic fresh oil system: After cold winter nights, the oil in the reservoir was so viscous that the engine could not be lubricated, as was the case with prolonged coasting (downhill driving), so that many engines were damaged by piston seizures and galling. Warranty and goodwill services put a strain on the balance sheet and customer confidence.

Another problem, especially of the F102 model, was the fact that the three-cylinder with 400 cm³ displacement per cylinder had reached the end of its development possibilities and even larger two-stroke engines were not established in the automotive industry.

In order to reduce the gasoline consumption, which is quite high in everyday operation, DKW resorted to a simple and successful means after a few months of production. Halfway through spring kinematics, the accelerator pedal was subjected to a significantly increased resistance to give the driver a better feeling for the power he was demanding from the engine. Such an accelerator pedal with a pressure point was also later used in the Trabant 601, whose fuel consumption was also regarded unfavorably high due to the two-stroke cycle in relation to the engine output.

=== End of production ===
Attempts to field a two-stroke V6 engine failed. The era of two-stroke engines in West German automobile construction ended with the F102. (Note: The two-stroke engine was only available in the DKW Munga off-road vehicle until December 1968.)

By March 1966, 52,753 (or possibly 53,053) vehicles had been produced. It was the last model developed by Auto Union before the Volkswagen take-over and with the end of production of the DKW F102, which was officially sold as an Auto Union, the DKW brand disappeared from the car market.

Under Volkswagen control, the F102 provided the basis for the later Audi F103 models (Note: The "Audi" and later "Audi 72", plus 60, 75, 80, and Super 90) and revived the Audi brand which had been part of the pre-war Auto Union concern.

== Müller-Andernach V6 ==
The engineer Hans Müller in Andernach (1902–1968) developed a six-cylinder V-two-stroke engine in the early 1960s, which, according to his own description, worked like two three-cylinder engines on a common crankshaft and was initially planned as a boat engine with different cubic capacities up to 1.6 liters. As a car engine, it had a displacement of 1288 cc with a bore of 62.5 mm and a stroke of 70 mm. The power was specified with 80 PS (59 kW) at 3800 rpm; the maximum torque was 15.4 kilogram force-metres (151 N⋅m).

For test drives with the six-cylinder engine built by Heinkel, the F102 was converted to radial tires of size 165–14; consumption was 9.5 liters of regular petrol per 100 kilometers. However, the engine was not taken into series production. It was then planned that the Bayreuth Motor Company, founded in 1966, would build it independently of Auto Union to replace the three-cylinder engine, but this turned out to be uneconomical. Probably only a few demonstration cars were built. At 83 kg, the V6 engine was hardly heavier than the standard R3 engine. The additional power of around 20 hp compared to the three-cylinder engine was hardly noticeable at top speed. A total of around 100 engines were built, which after the takeover of DKW were also installed in the DKW F12 or used as boat engines in individual cases.

== Technical details ==
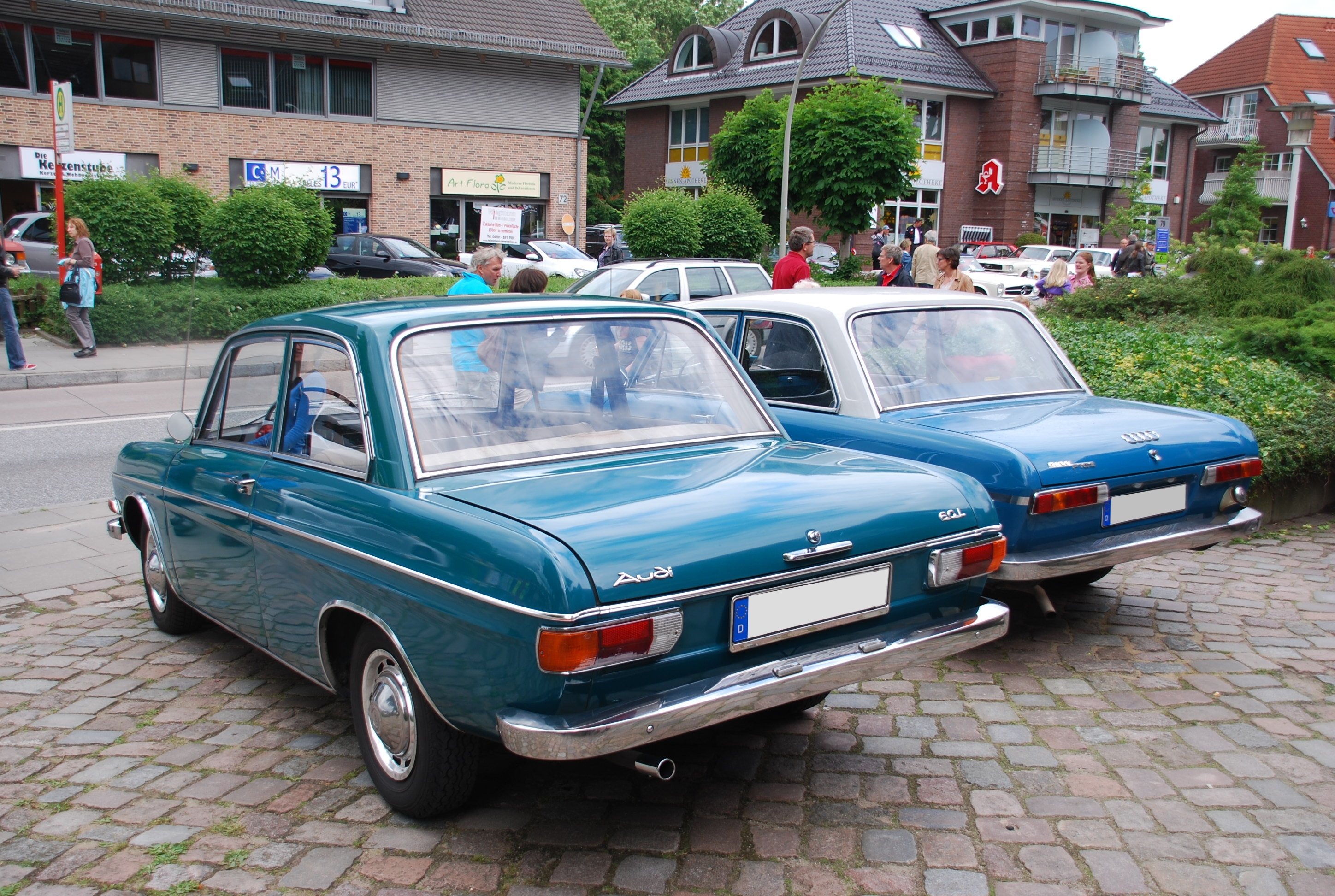
DKW F 102 (right) and its successor Audi F103 (built from 1969, large tail-lights)

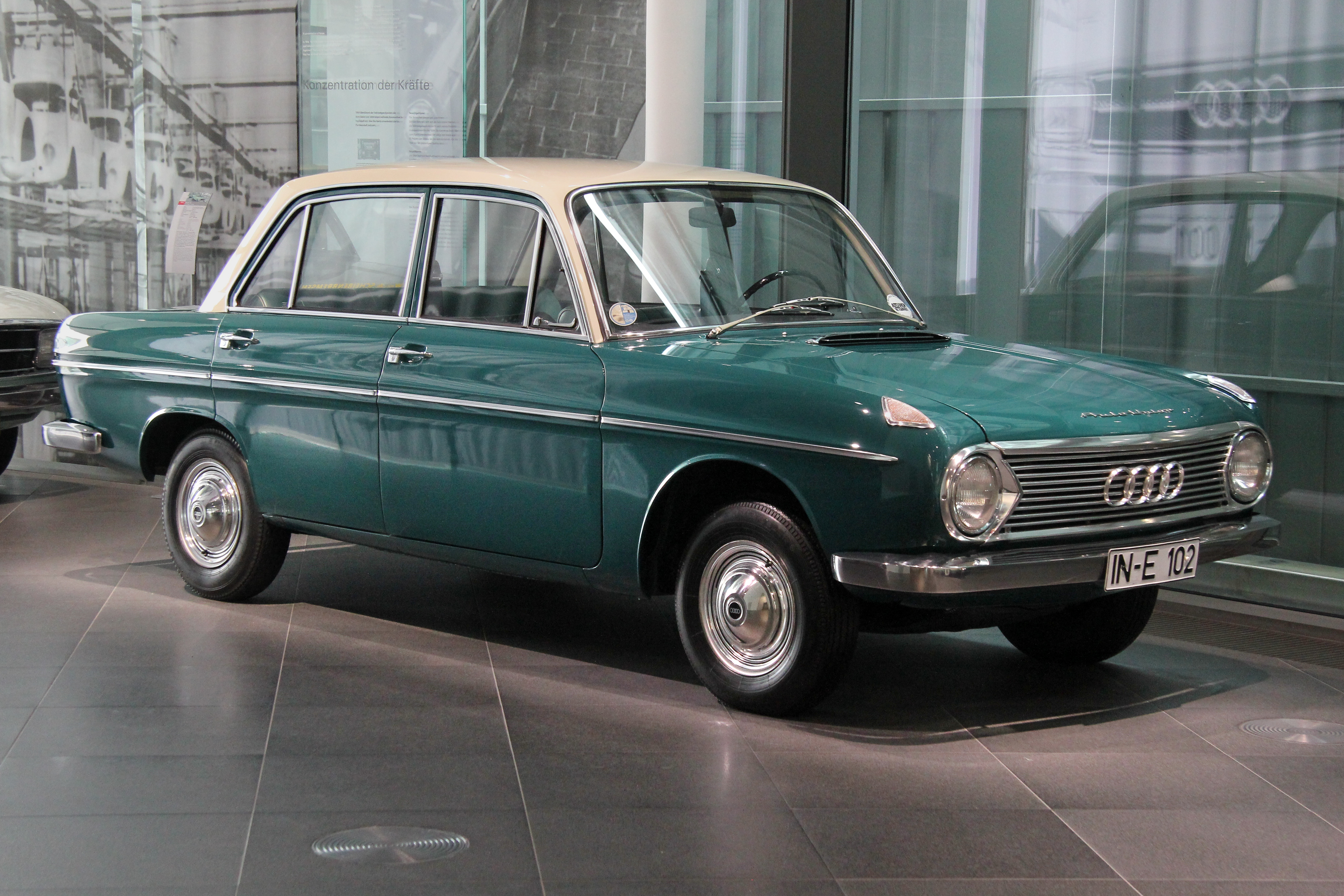
DKW F 102 shown at the museum mobile in Ingolstadt

Model	F 102	F 102 (V6)
Construction period	1964–1966	1966
Bodywork	Two- or four-door saloon	
Engine	I3, 2-stroke	V6, 2-stroke
Valves	None	
Bore × stroke	81 mm × 76 mm	62,5 mm × 70 mm
Cubic capacity	1175 cc	1288 cc
Output	44 kW (60 PS)	59 kW (80 PS)
at speed (rpm)	4500	3800
Torque (Nm)	103	142
at speed (rpm)	2250	3400
Compression	7.25–7.5 : 1	9.5 : 1
Consumption	11 L/100 km	8.6–11.2 L/100 km
Transmission	Column-shifted 4-speed manual	
Top speed	135 km/h	> 140 km/h
Weight (empty)	910–945 kg	
Perm. total weight	1335–1350 kg	
Electrical system	6 Volts	
Length	4280 mm	
Wid	1618 mm	
Height	1459 mm	
Wheelbase	2480 mm	
Front / rear track	1330 mm / 1326 mm	
Turning circle	11.4 m	
Wheel size	6.00–13"	165–14
