= Audi F103 =

Car model

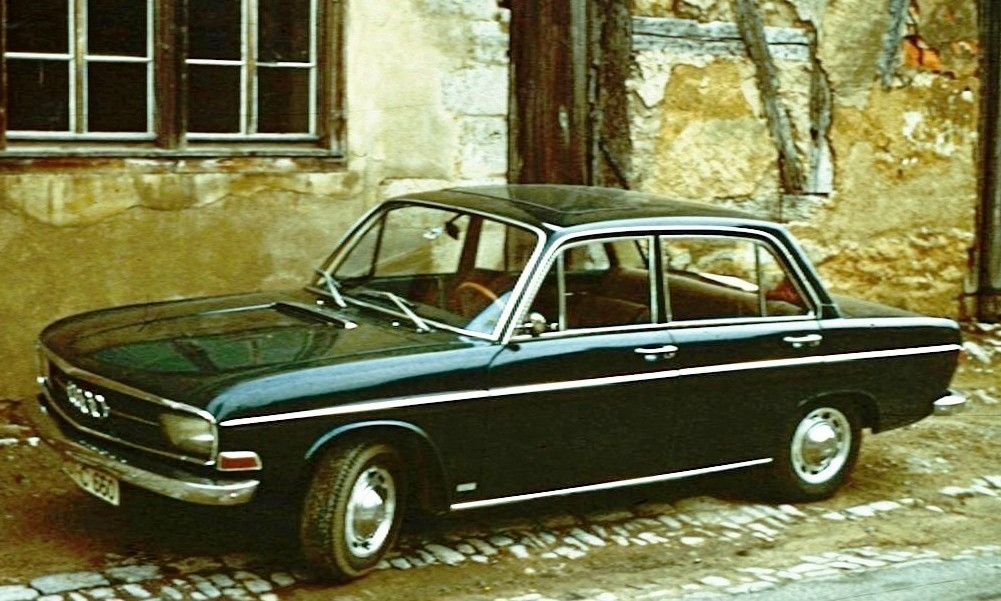
- Audi 75

Overview
- Manufacturer: Auto Union GmbH, Audi NSU Auto Union AG (1969–1972)
- Production: September 1965 – July 1972; 416,853 built of which: Saloon: 386,361; Variant (estate): 27,492
- Assembly: West Germany: Ingolstadt

Body and chassis
- Class: Compact executive car (D)
- Body style: 2- or 4-door saloon 3-door estate
- Layout: Longitudinal front engine, front-wheel drive

Powertrain
- Engine: 1.5–1.8 L Mercedes-Benz M118 I4
- Transmission: 4-speed manual

Dimensions
- Wheelbase: 2,490 mm (98 in)
- Length: 4,380 mm (172 in)
- Width: 1,626 mm (64.0 in)
- Curb weight: 960–1,065 kg (2,116–2,348 lb)

Chronology
- Predecessor: DKW F102
- Successor: Audi 80 B1

F103 is the internal designation for a series of car models produced by Auto Union in West Germany from 1965 to 1972, derived from the earlier DKW F102. To signify the change from a two-stroke to four-stroke engine, the DKW marque was dropped in favour of Audi, a name that had been dormant since before the Second World War.

== Models ==
The first model was launched simply as the Audi, later being renamed the Audi 72 (72 being the nominal power output of the engine in PS).

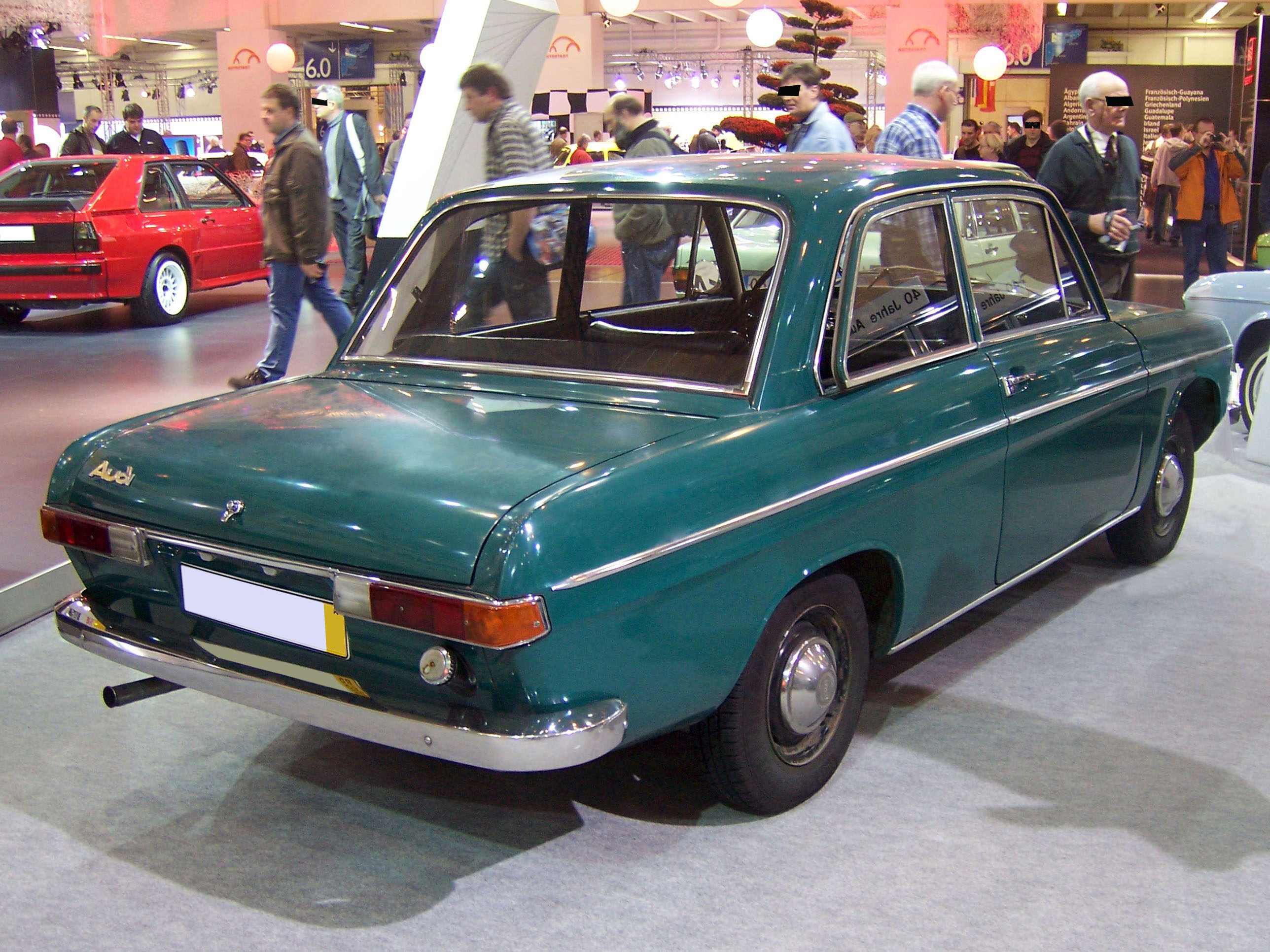
1966 Audi two-door saloon

The more powerful Audi 80 and Audi Super 90 sports saloons (with 80 and 90 PS respectively) appeared in 1966: in 1968 the arrival of the less powerful Audi 60 completed the range. Breaking somewhat with the naming pattern, the Audi 60 has 55 PS (40 kW), although export versions produce 65 PS (48 kW).

The Audi 75 replaced both the Audi 72 and the Audi 80 from 1969 onwards.

In 1972 the F103 series was discontinued in favour of the "B1" Audi 80.

== Engines ==
The F103 series were equipped exclusively with the M118 four-cylinder four-stroke engine. These were longitudinally mounted. This combination of front-wheel drive, which Auto Union's DKW brand had pioneered during the 1930s, and the longitudinal positioning of a four-cylinder engine would provide the basic template for Volkswagen's successful new Passat as well as the Audi models Audi 80 and Audi 100 after Volkswagenwerk AG acquired the Auto Union from Daimler-Benz late in 1964. Since the chassis on the F103 was taken from the DKW F102 with a three-cylinder two-stroke engine, the longer engine meant that the cooling system had to be offset to the left of the engine instead of the normal position in front of it. Because of the radiator's location, the front cylinder of the engine had a tendency to run cooler than the other three and as a consequence the spark plug tended to foul up, particularly if the engine was often used in city traffic. To avoid this, it was often recommended to run a hotter spark plug (with a lower heat range) in the front cylinder than in the other three.

The engines of the F103 series were developed by Daimler-Benz as part of a military project that never came to fruition. They were dubbed the Mitteldruckmotor (medium-pressure engines) because of their unusually high BMEP (mean effective pressure, as calculated from brake torque) values, which led to a good thermodynamic efficiency. The engines had spiral-formed intake channels that gave the fuel-air mixture a good swirl. The engine had Heron-type combustion chambers with broad squish bands, further enhancing the mixture swirl and aiding good combustion. These features made it possible to use very high compression ratios for the time. The initial engine version had a compression ratio of 11:1 for 98 RON fuel and even the engines intended for 92 RON fuel had a compression of 9:1, which was a very unusually high value for the time.

== Running gear ==
The car came with a four-speed manual transmission.

Inboard mounted front disc brakes were featured, which was still unusual in the mid-size car market at this time. The rear brakes followed the more conventional drum configuration.

== Bodywork ==
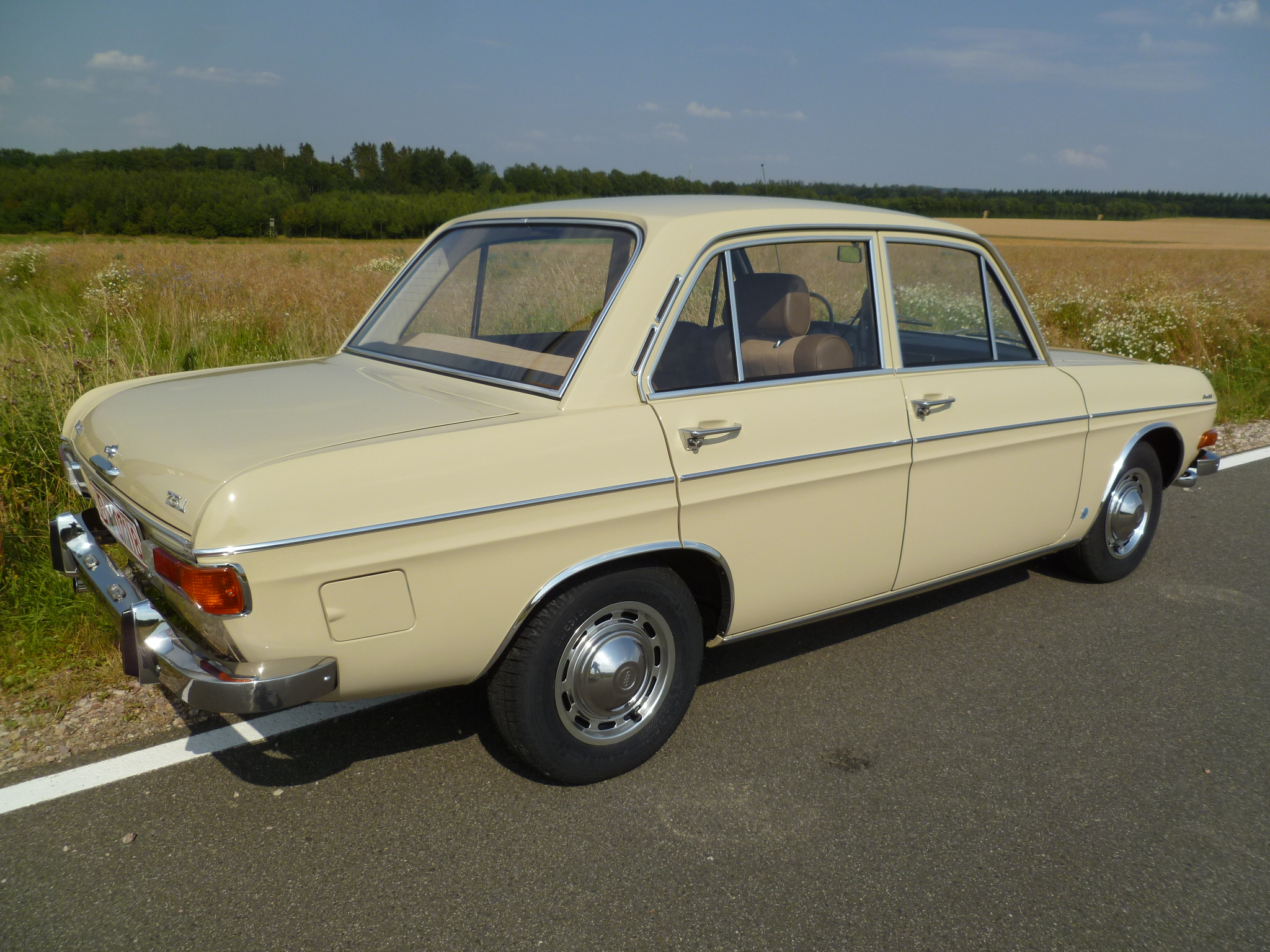
1971 Audi 75L four-door saloon, showing the new taillights and gas cap cover

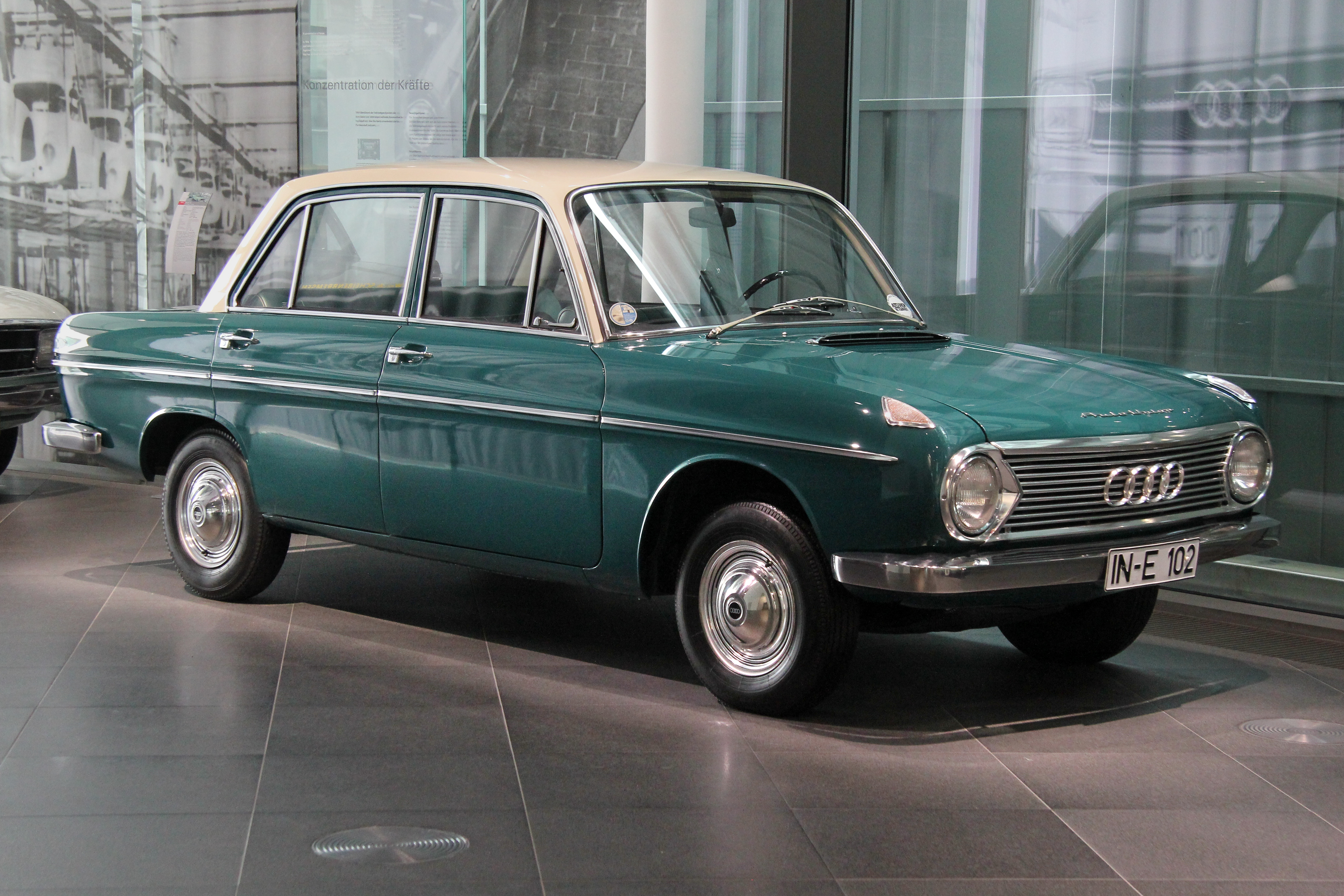
The form of the Audi F103's body closely followed that of the earlier DKW F102, shown here, though the Audi's engine was a break with the two-stroke DKW tradition.

The F103 bodyshell was a development of the earlier DKW F102. The engine compartment had to be extended so that the new four-cylinder engine could be accommodated. The front and tail were also cosmetically revised: Audi F103s sold in Europe all featured quasi-rectangular headlamps which were becoming fashionable at the time, whereas the F102 had used round headlamp units.

All Audi F103 models were offered as saloons with two and four doors. The two-door saloon, however, was not sold in markets such as Italy and Britain with little demand for two-door cars of this size.

With the exception of the Audi Super 90, the F103 series were available also as three-door estate models. Making its debut at the Geneva Motor Show in March 1966, this was called, like the Volkswagen estate models, Variant.

== Evolution ==
Initial changes were concentrated under the hood/bonnet where during the first two years of production the specification for the Solex carburetor was changed twice and in September 1967 the very high compression ratio was reduced from a (then) eye watering 11.2:1 to 9.1:1 which addressed serious "teething problems" with the engine as originally launched.

In September 1967 servo-assistance for the brakes became an option, the brakes on all but the basic model now being controlled using twin braking circuits, and by (in Germany) the final months of 1968 the range had settled down to three models, with the entry level Audi 60 powered by a 55 PS motor, the less basic Audi 75 producing 75 PS and the Audi Super 90 with 90 PS, able to challenge the performance image of some of the smaller BMWs.

Visually the car changed very little, but keen eyed observers would have noticed a discreetly modernised rear from August 1970, with slightly larger rear lights and a reshaped bumper. The fuel filler moved from its location to the right of the license plate on the rear panel to a position on the right hand wing of the car, and following a general trend of the period was now shielded by a flap that was flush with the bodywork. Inside the 1970 upgrade also involved a reconfigured dashboard.

== Sales ==
During the early 1960s, Auto Union was in commercial retreat: the Audi F103 was a relative success when compared with recent Auto Union products, even if its commercial success was trumped by subsequent Audi models. In July 1967, it was reported that 100,000 Audis had been completed: production of the F103 had by now built up to a rate of almost 40,000 per year and the company was moved to deny speculation that another new Audi model would be presented at the Frankfurt Motor Show in the Autumn / Fall of 1967. (The Audi 100 was introduced only towards the end of 1968.)

Audi Super 90 US Sales
Year	US Sales
1970	6,557
1971	2,425
1972	1,928

== Specifications ==
Technical data Audi F103 — Manufacturer's figures except where stated
Audi F103	Audi 60 2- or 4-door saloon 3-door 'Variant' estate	Audi 72 2- or 4-door saloon 3-door 'Variant' estate	Audi 75 2- or 4-door saloon 3-door 'Variant' estate	Audi 80 2- or 4-door saloon 3-door 'Variant' estate	Audi Super 90 2- or 4-door saloon
Years Produced	1968–1972	1965–1969	1969–1972	1966–1969	1966–1972
Units Produced (Note: Excludes estate 'Variant' bodied cars.)	216,988	122,579			49,794
Engine	M118 4-cylinder-inline engine (four-stroke), longitudinally front-mounted				
Bore × Stroke	80 mm × 74.4 mm	80 mm × 84.4 mm			81.5 mm × 84.4 mm
Displacement	1496 cc	1697 cc			1761 cc
Max. Power	55 PS (40 kW; 54 hp) export: 65 PS (48 kW; 64 hp)	72 PS (53 kW; 71 hp)	75 PS (55 kW; 74 hp)	80 PS (59 kW; 79 hp)	90 PS (66 kW; 89 hp)
at engine speed	4750 rpm	5000 rpm	5000 rpm	5000 rpm	5200 rpm
Compression Ratio	9.1:1	11.2:1	9.1:1	11.0:1	10.6:1
Acceleration; 0–100 km/h (0–62 mph)	18.0 s	14.8 s	14.5 s	14.0 s	12.2 s
Max Speed	138 km/h (86 mph); 144 km/h (89 mph)	148 km/h (92 mph)	150 km/h (93 mph)	152 km/h (94 mph)	163 km/h (101 mph)
Fuel feed	single Solex carburetor				
Valvetrain, cooling	OHV, water-cooled				
Electrical system	12-volt				
Front suspension	Double wishbone, torsion bar				
Rear suspension	Beam axle, Trailing-arms, Panhard rod, Torsion bar				
Brakes	Front inboard discs / Rear drum brakes				
Body structure	Monocoque				
Dry weight	960–1,065 kg (2,116–2,348 lb)				
Track front/rear	1,343 mm (52.9 in) / 1,327 mm (52.2 in)				
Wheelbase	2,490 mm (98 in)				
Length × Width × Height	4,380 mm × 1,626 mm × 1,451 mm (172.4 in × 64.0 in × 57.1 in)				
Steering, turning circle	rack and pinion, 10.59 m (34 ft 9 in)				
