= Mercedes-Benz M118 engine =

Mercedes-Benz M118
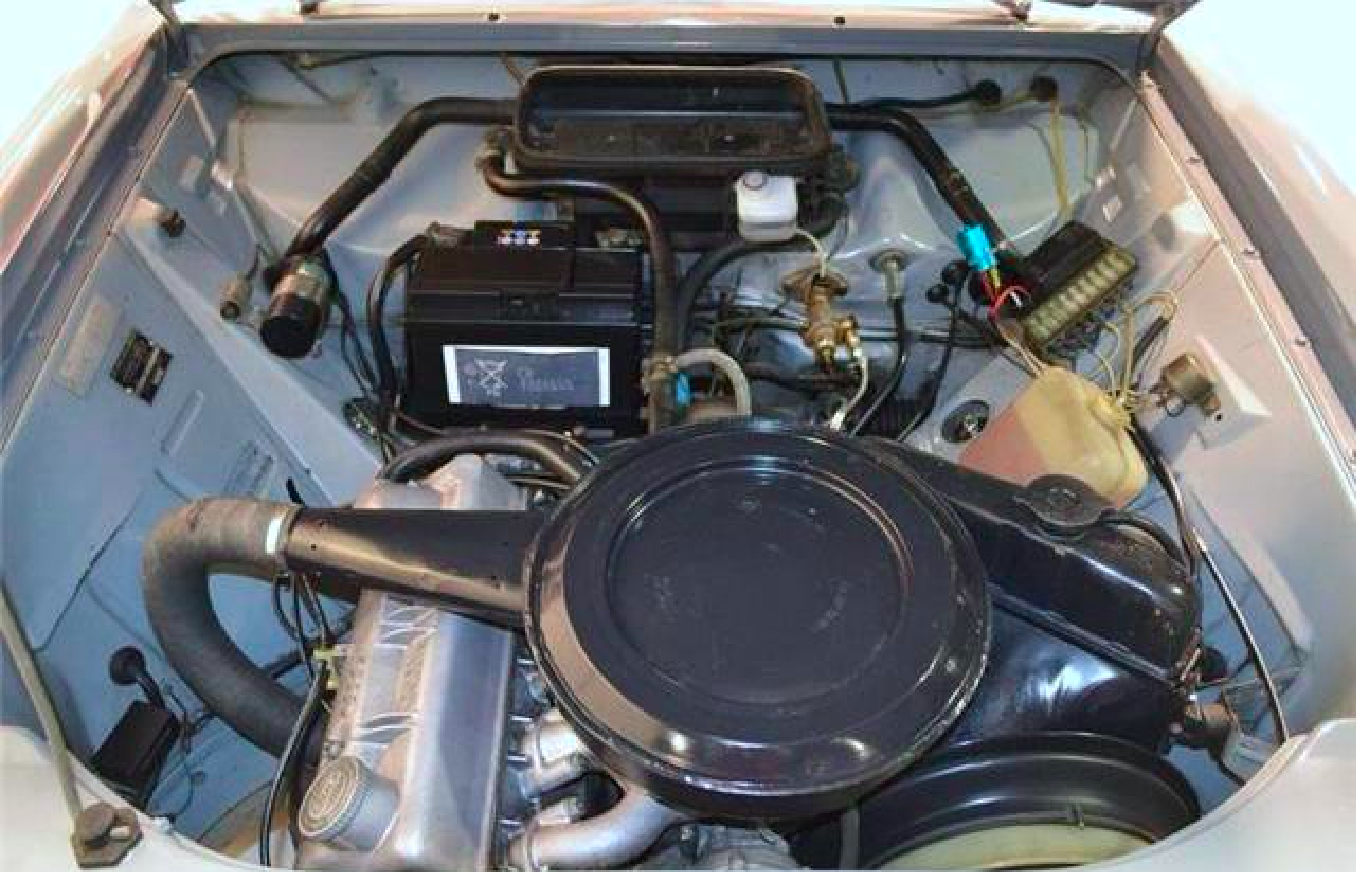

Overview
- Manufacturer: Audi
- Also called: H engine; M118 Mexico
- Production: September 1965 – July 1972

Layout
- Configuration: Inline 4
- Displacement: 1.5 L (1,496 cc); 1.7 L (1,697 cc); 1.8 L (1,760 cc)
- Cylinder bore: 80 mm (3.15 in)
- Piston stroke: 84.4 mm (3.32 in)
- Cylinder block material: Cast iron
- Cylinder head material: Cast iron
- Valvetrain: OHV
- Compression ratio: 9.1:1; 11.2:1 (1.7 L engines); 10.6:1 (1.8 L engines)

Combustion
- Fuel system: Carburetor
- Fuel type: Gasoline
- Cooling system: Water cooled

Output
- Power output: 40–66 kW (54–90 PS; 54–89 hp)
- Torque output: 113–147 N⋅m (83–108 lb⋅ft)

Chronology
- Successor: Volkswagen EA827 engine

The M118 is a four-stroke inline-four engine produced from 1965 to 1972.

== Design ==
The M118 was originally developed by Mercedes-Benz for the mass-produced vehicle segment. It was first used by Audi in the F103, after Daimler AG sold the company to Volkswagen. The engine replaced the previous two-stroke engines, featured a Solex carburetor, and utilised a swirling effect in the intake ducts that allowed for smoother operation and enhanced efficiency. It was later revised several times with increased displacements and reduced compression ratios for improved reliability. The success of the M118 allowed Audi to expand into more upscale market segments. On the basis of OHV 4 cylinder M118 engine, Volkswagen engineers created modified 2.0 SOHC unit called VW EA831, that was later used in Audi 100 (C2, 1976–1982), Volkswagen LT and eventually in the Porsche 924.

== Engines ==
Displacement	Power	Torque	Years
1.5 L; 91.3 cu in (1,496 cc)	40 kW (54 PS; 54 hp) at 4,750 rpm	113 N⋅m (83 lb⋅ft) at 2,600 rpm	1968–1972
1.7 L; 103.6 cu in (1,697 cc)	53 kW (72 PS; 71 hp) at 5,000 rpm	127 N⋅m (94 lb⋅ft) at 2,800 rpm	1965–1968
1.7 L; 103.6 cu in (1,697 cc)	55 kW (75 PS; 74 hp) at 5,000 rpm	127 N⋅m (94 lb⋅ft) at 3,000 rpm	1968–1972
1.7 L; 103.6 cu in (1,697 cc)	59 kW (80 PS; 79 hp) at 5,000 rpm	132 N⋅m (97 lb⋅ft) at 5,000 rpm	1966–1968
1.8 L; 107.4 cu in (1,760 cc)	66 kW (90 PS; 89 hp) at 5,300 rpm	147 N⋅m (108 lb⋅ft) at 3,000 rpm	1966–1971

=== M118 ===
40 kW version

- 1968–1972 Audi 60

53 kW version

- 1965–1968 Audi 72

55 kW version

- 1968–1972 Audi 75

59 kW version

- 1966–1968 Audi 80

66 kW version

- 1966–1971 Audi 90
