= Cultural depictions of the Salem witch trials =

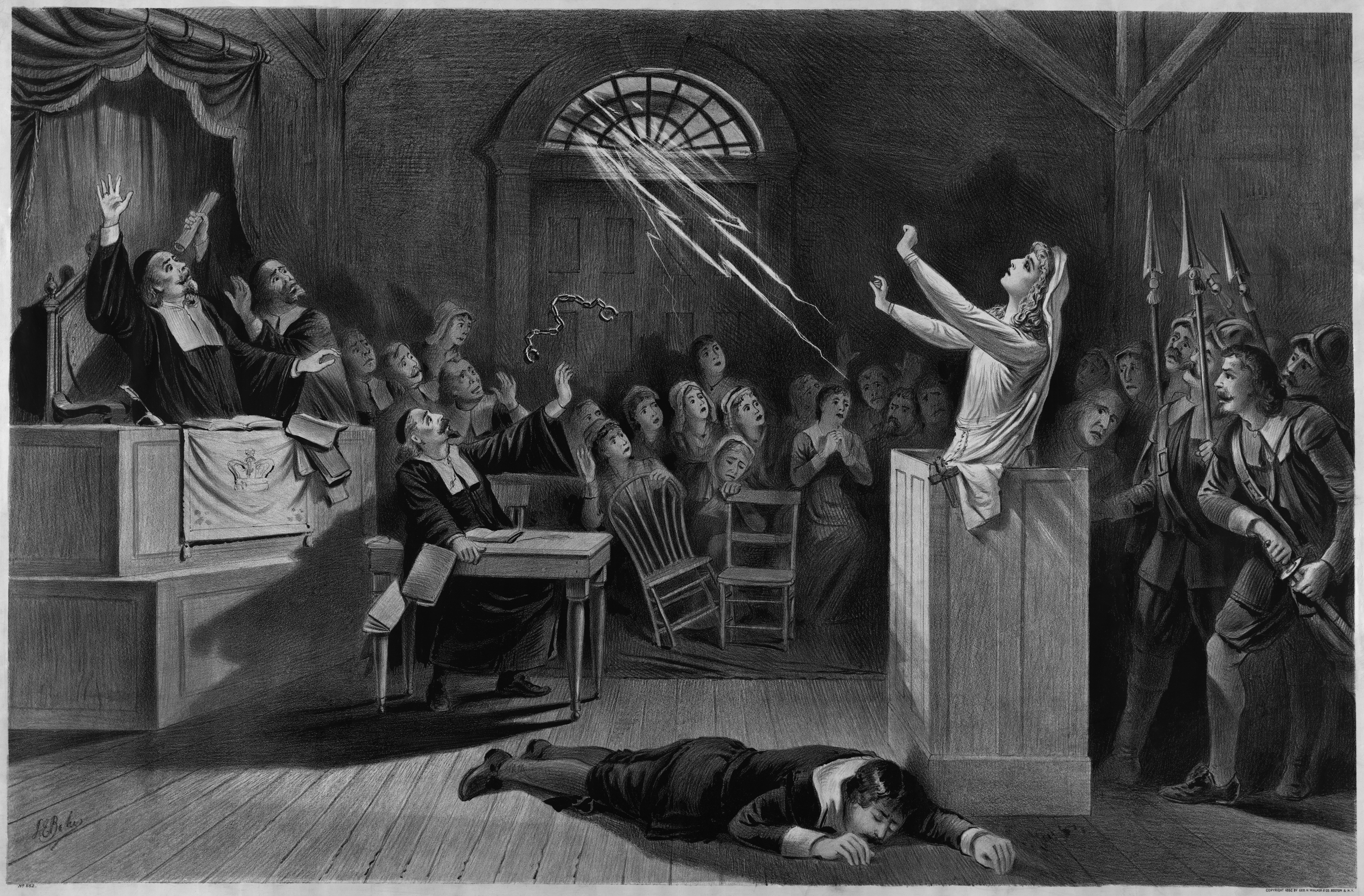
Fanciful representation of the Salem witch trials, lithograph from 1892

Cultural depictions of the Salem witch trials abound in art, literature and popular media in the United States, from the early 19th century to the present day. The literary and dramatic depictions are discussed in Marion Gibson's Witchcraft Myths in American Culture (New York: Routledge, 2007) and see also Bernard Rosenthal's Salem Story: Reading the Witch Trials of 1692

== In literature ==
- Salem, an Eastern Tale (1820), by an unknown author, published serially in three instalments of the New York Literary Journal and Belles-Lettres Repository, a New York-based literary journal
- Rachel Dyer (1828), by John Neal (1793–1876)
- American poet John Greenleaf Whittier (1807–1892) wrote many poems about the events, starting with "The Weird Gathering"(1831), and later, "Calef in Boston" (1849), about the public debates between Robert Calef and Cotton Mather in the aftermath of the trials
- Young Goodman Brown is a short story published in 1835 by Nathaniel Hawthorne
- The Salem Belle: A Tale of 1692, anonymous. Tappan & Dennett, Boston, 1842
- Witching Times (serialized 1856–57), by John William De Forest (1826–1906)
- Lois the Witch (1859), a novella by Elizabeth Gaskell (1810–1865), is based on the Salem witch hunts and depicts how jealousy and sexual desire can lead to hysteria. She was inspired by the story of Rebecca Nurse whose accusation, trial and execution are described in Lectures on Witchcraft, by Charles W. Upham, the Unitarian minister in Salem in the 1830s. Historical figure Cotton Mather makes an appearance in the story.
- Giles Corey of the Salem Farms (1868), a play by Henry Wadsworth Longfellow (1807–1882)
- Salem: A Tale of the Seventeenth Century (1874), a historical novel by D. R. Castleton (Harper, New York)
- "Giles Corey, Yeoman" (1893), a play by Mary E. Wilkins Freeman (1852–1930)
- The Witch of Salem, or Credulity Run Mad, by John R. Musick. New York: Funk & Wagnalls Company, 1893. Historical fiction set during the witchcraft trials.

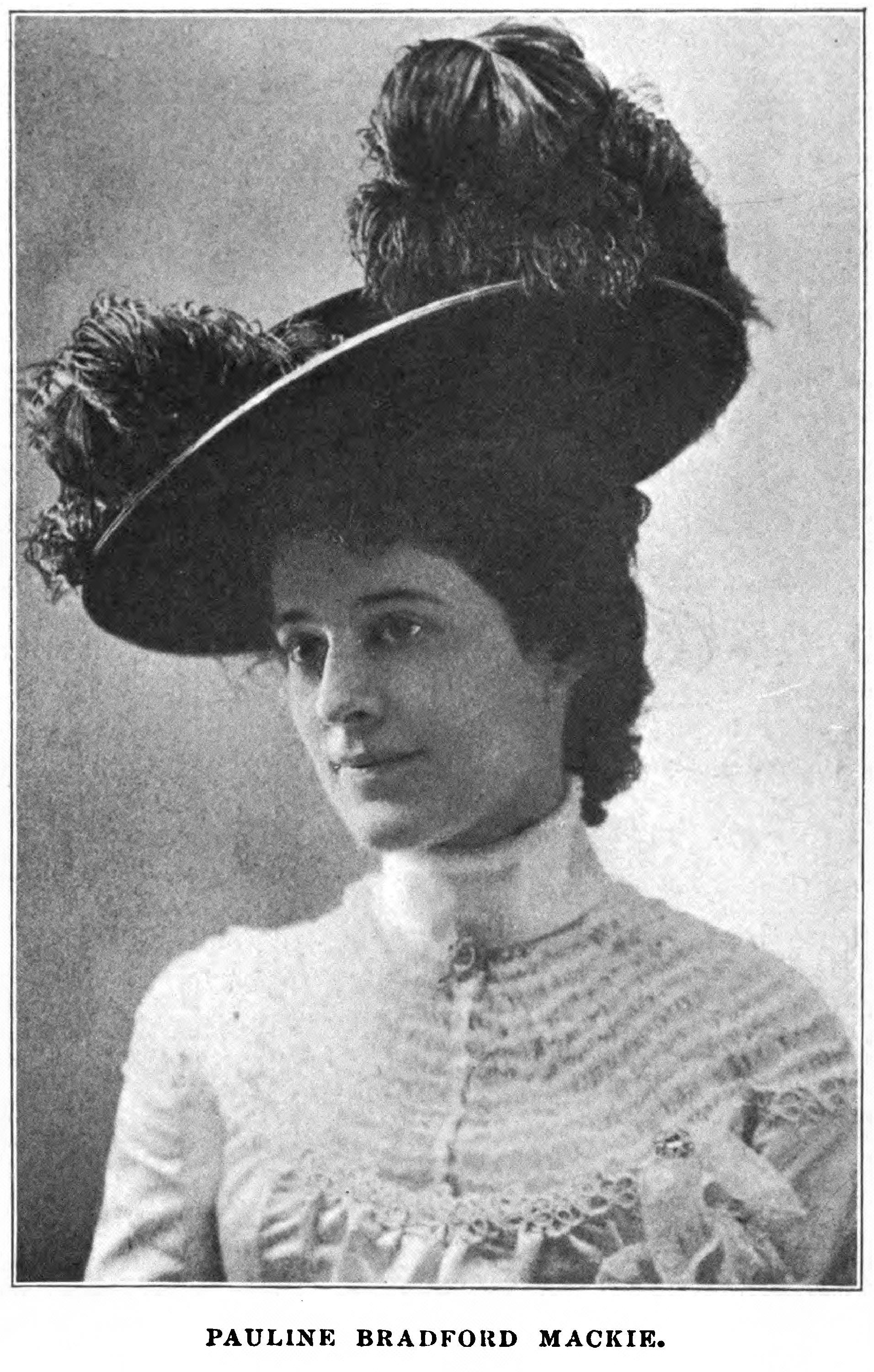
Pauline Bradford Mackie

- Ye lyttle Salem maide, a story of witchcraft (1898), a novel by Pauline Bradford Mackie (1873–?), Lamson, Wolffe and Co., Boston, 1898.
- The Witch Hunter's Wards; or The Hunted Orphans of Salem by Richard R. Montgomery, Pluck and Luck No. 151, April 24, 1901.
- Dulcibel: A tale of old Salem by Henry Peterson, Philadelphia: John C. Winston, 1907. Historical fiction.
- Various stories by H. P. Lovecraft (1890–1937) are set in the fictional town of Arkham, Massachusetts, said to have been founded by refugees from the Salem trials. For example, in The Dreams in the Witch-House, the witch Keziah Mason is said to have fled Salem.
- A Witch of Salem: Grand Opera in Two Acts (1926), book by Nelle Richmond Eberhart, music by Charles Wakefield Cadman
- A Mirror for Witches (1928) by Esther Forbes (1891–1968)
- Road to Endor (1940) by Esther Hammand
- The Devil in Boston (1948, premiered 1953 in Los Angeles), translated by June Barrows Mussey from the original German "Wahn oder Der Teufel in Boston" (1948, premiered 1949 in Frankfurt a. M.), a play by Lion Feuchtwanger (1884–1958), a German-Jewish writer in exile in the US. Main characters are Cotton Mather (1663–1728) and Hanna Parrish, Feuchtwanger's adaptation of Elizabeth Parris. Depicts the dynamics of the witch hunt and the interests of the Mathers. A fictional character represents Enlightenment thought.
- The Crucible (1952), a play by Arthur Miller (1915–2005). Arguably the most famous cultural depiction, uses the trial events to reflect on the actions of the House Committee on Unamerican Activities and Senator Joe McCarthy.
- Tituba of Salem Village (1956), a children's book by Ann Petry
- The Witchcraft of Salem Village (1956), a children's book by Shirley Jackson
- The Crucible (1961), an opera by Robert Ward (1917–2013), based on the 1952 play by Arthur Miller
- The Pariah (1983) by Graham Masterton takes place in Salem and attributes the trials to the presence of the Aztec demon Mictlantecuhtli
- Witches' Children (1987), a young adult novel by Patricia Clapp, told from the perspective of Mary Warren, one of the young accusers
- I, Tituba: Black Witch of Salem (1992), translated from the original French Moi, Tituba, sorcière noire de Salem (1986), by Maryse Condé. Condé freely imagines Tituba's childhood and old age, endows her with a contemporary social consciousness, and allows her to narrate the tale.
- A Break with Charity (1992), a young adult novel by Ann Rinaldi (1934–2021), takes the Salem trials as its main setting
- The Secret Circle Trilogy (1992) is a young adult book series by L.J. Smith, which takes place in New Salem. The series focuses on Cassie Blake, a 16-year-old girl who is drawn to a group of high school teenagers who are witches and are hunted by witch hunters.
- Acceptable Risk (1994), an adult medical thriller novel by Robin Cook (born 1940), with a plot that attributes the afflictions in Salem to an unusual mold that is rediscovered by present-day medical researchers.
- Beyond the Burning Time (1996), a young adult novel by Kathryn Lasky, which depicts the trials through the eyes of a fictional young woman, Mary Chase.
- Gallows Hill (1997) by Lois Duncan (1934–2016) is young-adult fiction in which main character Sarah, and many others, turn out to be reincarnations of those accused and killed during the trials.
- In the Doctor Who Past Doctor Adventures novel The Witch Hunters (1998) by Steve Lyons, the First Doctor, his granddaughter Susan Foreman and their companions Ian Chesterton and Barbara Wright visit Salem in the midst of the witch trials. Historical figures such as Reverend Samuel Parris, Rebecca Nurse, Abigail Williams, Ann Putnam, Jr. and John Proctor are major characters in the novel.
- Both the third and fourth books in the Harry Potter series (Harry Potter and the Prisoner of Azkaban (1999) and Harry Potter and the Goblet of Fire (2000), respectively) make slight references to the Salem trials. The trials are further described in the Pottermore website.
- Dorcas Good, The Diary of a Salem Witch (1999) by Rose Earhart, is a fictional diary of remembrance by an adult character, based on her imprisonment as a child during the witchcraft trials, based on what happened to Dorothy Good. ISBN 978-1-893221-00-0
- Witch Child (2000) by Celia Rees, is a fictional story about a young woman in Puritan New England who was a healer and pagan. ISBN 978-0-7636-4228-0
- I Walk in Dread: The Diary of Deliverance Trembly, Witness to the Salem Witch Trials, Massachusetts Bay Colony 1691 (Dear America Series) (2004), by Lisa Rowe Fraustino (born 1961), is young-adult historical fiction set during the Salem Witch Trials
- In The Last Witchfinder (2006), a historical novel by James Morrow (1947-living), the Salem Witch Trials feature prominently.
- "Oyer and Terminer", a sci-fi short story by Joe Masdon in the collection "Time Twisters" (Jean Rabe and Martin H. Greenberg, eds, DAW, 2007), is set during the Salem witch trials
- The Lace Reader (2008) by Brunonia Barry, is a psychological suspense novel based in Salem and refers to many aspects of the trials including the arrest of Bridget Bishop. ISBN 978-0-06-162476-6
- The Heretic's Daughter: A Novel (2008), by Kathleen Kent, is a fictionalized account of the case of Martha Carrier, as told from the point of view of her 10-year-old daughter, Sarah Carrier. ISBN 978-0-316-02448-8
- The Physick Book of Deliverance Dane (2009) by Katherine Howe, is a fictional account of a woman in the 21st century connecting with an ancestor, Deliverance Dane of Andover, who was accused of witchcraft during the Salem witch trials. ISBN 978-1-4013-4090-2
- Time of the Witches (2009) by Ann Meyers is a story that describes a fictional character, Drucilla, as she grows up during the witch trials. Many real people, including Tituba, make appearances.
- Supernatural: One Year Gone (2011) by Rebecca Dessertine is a story based on the TV show Supernatural in which Dean Winchester travels to Salem and discovers a journal by one of his ancestors from the time of the Witch Trials that reveals all the women hanged were innocent and that the real witches instigated the trials as a cover for their evil activities. At the end of the story, while fighting the witches, Dean summons the ghosts of all those killed in the Trials and they kill the two evil witches responsible for their deaths.
- Conversion (2014) by Katherine Howe describes the mass hysteria of the fictional St. Joan's Academy in Danvers, Massachusetts, interlaced with intercalary chapters from the perspective of Ann Putnam – one of the Salem accusers – as she tells the town's new reverend how the witch hunt began and escalated based on her testimony and the testimonies of the other girls. The novel explores the occurrence of modern-day hysteria through juxtaposition against the Salem Witch Trials.
- Witches, Secrets and Lies (2017) written by Micky Jenkins and published by Burlington Books follows 16 year old Sarah Smith and her 17 year old boyfriend Michael Howard as they traverse through the insanity of the Salem witch trials, after making enemies with Abigail Finch, the daughter of the minister. It's split between Sarah's story and Michael's story.
- Becky Nurse of Salem (2019) by Sarah Ruhl is a play in which a modern descendant of Rebecca Nurse examines the injustice done during the Salem witch trials and the effects those trials continue to have in the present. Ruhl also examines the historical inaccuracies that "The Crucible" by Arthur Miller has perpetuated which mask the gender and sexual politics that seem to have been at the root of Miller's play, as well as the hysteria perpetrated in Salem.
- The Once and Future Witches (2020) by Alix E. Harrow is set in an alternate past in which witchcraft is real, but has been banned, and in which women seek to reclaim their power through witchcraft. The action takes place in a town called New Salem, 100 miles from the original Salem (called "Old Salem" in the book), which was destroyed by witchcraft and features in important ways in the storyline.
- We Ride Upon Sticks (2020) by Quan Barry is set in the 1980s in Danvers, Massachusetts, which was known as Salem Village during the Salem Witch Trials. The protagonists are members of a field hockey team who take inspiration from the events of 1692, starting a coven and using what may be witchcraft to gain a winning edge.
- Gallows Hill (2023) by Lois Ruby, a young-adult novel that follows Thomas, a young Quaker recently arrived from England, and Patience, a young Puritan girl, and their perspectives on the trials.

== In popular culture and media ==
=== Film ===
- Maid of Salem (1937): a film starring Claudette Colbert and Fred MacMurray, with Bonita Granville, Gale Sondergaard, Louise Dresser, Beulah Bondi, Virginia Weidler, and Madame Sul-Te-Wan as Tituba, directed by Frank Lloyd
- I Married a Witch (1942): a film starring Veronica Lake and Fredric March, with Robert Benchley, Susan Hayward, Cecil Kellaway and Elizabeth Patterson, directed by René Clair; a witch burned in Salem centuries ago (Lake) comes back to haunt descendants of Puritan (March) who sent her to her death. Comedy-fantasy with special effects.
- The Crucible (1957): a Franco-East German film, originally titled Les Sorcières de Salem, starring Simone Signoret and Yves Montand and directed by Raymond Rouleau. Its screenplay was adapted by Jean-Paul Sartre from Arthur Miller's The Crucible.
- Bell Book and Candle (1958): a film starring James Stewart and Kim Novak; Novak plays a witch from old Salem who is still living in 1950s Greenwich Village.
- Hocus Pocus (1993), a Disney comedy film, starring Bette Midler, Sarah Jessica Parker and Kathy Najimy as three sisters who were hanged as witches in colonial Salem, and who return to life in twentieth century Salem to wreak comic havoc. Coincidentally, Parker would later discover, as documented in the NBC program Who Do You Think You Are?, that her 10th great-grandmother, Esther Elwell, was charged with witchcraft in November 1692, but was not tried.
- The Crucible (1996) is a film adaptation of Arthur Miller's 1952 play The Crucible, from a screenplay written by Miller himself; starring Daniel Day-Lewis and Winona Ryder
- Scooby-Doo! and the Witch's Ghost (1999), loosely based on the Salem mythology, recounts a descendant of a witch, who attempts to revive her and destroy the town that condemned her.
- Keeper of Souls (2004), a horror film set in a fictional Southern town called Grove Hill, connects the demon to the Salem Witch Trials.
- The Covenant (2006), a horror film that takes places in Ipswich, Massachusetts, which ties the supernatural powers of the present-day characters to their colonial ancestors, who had been charged with witchcraft during the Salem witch trials.
- Salem: Examine the Evidence (2011) is a documentary film about the trials shown daily the Visitor Center in Salem, Massachusetts. It was filmed entirely on-location with re-enactors and scholars for the National Park Service and the Essex National Heritage Area (https://www.essexheritage.org/salemwitchhunt/)
- Salem: The True 1692 (2011) is a 3D film about the trials. (https://cinemasalem.com/movies/the-true-1692-3d)
- A Haunting in Salem (2011) is a 3D horror film directed by Shane Van Dyke and starring Bill Oberst Jr., Courtney Abbiati and Jenna Stone.
- The Lords of Salem (2012), a horror film written and directed by Rob Zombie about a coven of 300-year-old witches who were secretly imprisoned and tortured during the Salem witch trials.
- ParaNorman (2012) animated film takes place in a Massachusetts town that in 1712 held witch trials and convicted and executed an innocent girl as a witch.
- The Autopsy of Jane Doe (2016) is a horror movie depicting an autopsy performed on a dead woman found in a bizarre crime scene. The coroners find increasingly strange clues and experience supernatural and unexplainable events in their attempt to find out the mysterious body's identity and cause of death. Towards the end of the film, the body was revealed to be that of a Salem witch.
- Fear Street Trilogy (2021), a horror movie trilogy that regularly references the trials of Salem, for example Sheriff Goode is an homage to one of the first victims of the Salem trials, Sarah Good.
- Hocus Pocus 2 (2022), A horror sequel to Hocus Pocus, 2 teenage girls bring back the Sanderson sisters and the witches bring havoc back to Salem just like they did 29 years ago.

=== Television and radio ===
- An early episode of the CBS radio program You Are There dramatized key events of the Witch Trials (1947).
- The television series Bewitched (1964–1972) includes six episodes in Season 7 (1970) that were filmed on location in Salem, with a plot that includes time travel to 1692.
- Leonard Nimoy's television series In Search of... (1977–1982) aired Season 5, Episode 109: "Salem Witches" (1980)
- In episode four, "Agents of Satan" (which first aired on October 31, 1982), of the science-fiction TV show Voyagers!, the main characters, Bogg and Jeff, help save Abiah Folger, the mother of Benjamin Franklin, from being burned at the stake during the Salem witch trials.
- A television mini-series Three Sovereigns for Sarah, starring Vanessa Redgrave, Kim Hunter and Will Lyman, first aired on PBS on May 27, 1985.
- In The Simpsons animated television comedy series (1989–present), a segment of the 1997 Halloween special episode "Treehouse of Horror VIII" is based on the Salem witch trials.
- Episode 348 of Season 19 of the sketch comedy series Saturday Night Live (first aired October 2, 1993) contained a skit depicting the "Salem Bitch Trials" in which Abigail Wolcott, played by Shannen Doherty (who played Betty Parris in the aforementioned Voyagers! episode and the witch Prue Halliwell in the TV series Charmed, see below), is examined by Deputy Governor Danforth, played by Phil Hartman, on charges of "bitchcraft."
- In the segment of Animaniacs' Episode 62, "Witch One" (which parodies the song tunes from Disney's Beauty and the Beast), Rita and Runt find themselves in colonial Salem, where she is mistaken for a witch.
- In Season 3, Episode 4 of The Scooby-Doo Show, the main cast of characters arrives in Salem to investigate a "witch" (who turns out to be a human covering up her crimes in a witch costume) haunting the town.
- In the television series Sabrina the Teenage Witch (1996–2000), in Season 1, Episode 23 (1997), "The Crucible," a class field trip goes to Salem to re-enact the trials.
- In Histeria!, an animated television series for children (1998–2001), episode 36, "When America Was Young", included a People's Court-style sketch based upon the trials. View episode: News, Politics, Sports, Mail & Latest Headlines
- The History Channel's In Search of History (1996–2000) television series aired the episode "Salem Witch Trials" (1998).
- In the Buffy the Vampire Slayer episode "Gingerbread", Buffy Summers, Willow Rosenberg and Amy Madison are sentenced to burn at the stake after the apparent sacrifice of two children in an occult ritual.
- In Charmed, a television series (1998–2006), part of the fictional background is that Melinda Warren, an ancestor of the three fictional protagonists, was burned at the stake in the Salem witch trials. See Season 1, Episode 9, "The Witch Is Back" (1998) and Season 3, Episode 4, "All Halliwell's Eve" (2000)
- PBS's television series Secrets of the Dead (2000— ) aired Season 2, Episode 1: "Witches' Curse" (2002), featuring Linnda R. Caporael
- The History Channel aired a documentary, Witch Hunt (2002).
- Salem Witch Trials (2002), a mini-series directed by Joseph Sargent and written by Maria Nation, starring Kirstie Alley, Henry Czerny, Gloria Reuben, Jay O. Sanders and Alan Bates, with appearances by Shirley MacLaine and Peter Ustinov, aired in the US on CBS in two parts, in the UK as four parts.
- The Discovery Channel's Unsolved History series (2002–2005) included Episode 23, "Salem Witch Trials" (2003).
- Ghost Hunters, Season 3, Episode 17: "Salem Witch", October 24, 2007, explores the haunting of the Hawthorne Hotel by the spirit of Bridget Bishop, one of the people executed in 1692.
- In The Vampire Diaries, Bonnie Bennett's ancestors were Salem witches, who fled Salem in 1692.
- The BBC and the National Geographic Channel aired a documentary about Salem in 2011, hosted by novelist Katherine Howe, called Salem Witch Trial Conspiracy in Great Britain, and Salem: Unmasking the Devil; and in the US, with British and American narrators respectively.
- In Bones season 5, episode 20: "The Witch in the Wardrobe" references to the occult and the Salem Witch Trials for the basis for the plot.
- Aidan from Being Human on the Syfy channel has an encounter with a witch. Aidan: "Let me guess, Salem?" Ms. Gilchrist: "Andover. But Salem got all the press."
- In the television series The Secret Circle, which aired on The CW between 2011 and 2012, the ancestors of the main characters and the witch families in Chance Harbor, are all descendants of six of the eighteen witch families who escaped from Salem in 1692.
- The third season of the series American Horror Story: Coven (2013) primarily follows the antics of a coven of Salem descendants who reside in a boarding school, Miss Robichaux's Academy, in New Orleans, Louisiana.
- Salem is an American historical drama television series created by Adam Simon and Brannon Braga; it aired on WGN America beginning April 20, 2014, as its first original-scripted series. Starring Janet Montgomery and Shane West, it was said to be based on the Salem witch trials in the 17th century, with a "twist": the witches were real and in charge of the trials.
- In the 6th episode of season 9 of Criminal Minds the fictional BAU is hunting an unsub who is recreating the trials.
- The season 2 episode "The Salem Witch Hunt" of the NBC series Timeless takes place on September 22, 1692, during the Salem Witch Trials. In the episode, Lucy, Rufus, and Garcia Flynn try to save Abiah Franklin, the future mother of Benjamin Franklin, from being hung in the trials after she is accused of Witchcraft.
- The Salem Witch Trials were depicted in the Legends of Tomorrow episode "Witch Hunt."
- T+E aired a 4-Part miniseries in October–November 2019 called Witches of Salem which serves as a dramatized historical documentary which shows what befell Salem in 1692 during the trials.
- Motherland: Fort Salem is a TV series that takes place in an alternate reality some 300 years after the trials in which the witches made a deal with the US Government to allow them to live in return for helping them with their powers.
- The eighth episode of the Disney+ miniseries WandaVision, titled "Previously On", is briefly set during the Salem witch trials of 1693, where the witch Agatha Harkness is accused by her fellow witches of practicing black magic and betraying her coven. She is nearly executed while held against a wooden post before retaliating and killing every member of her coven.

=== Comic books ===
- Issue No. 29 of Black Cat Mystery Comics, from June 1946, includes the cover story, "Black Cat Battles the Salem Witch."
- "The Salem Terror" was a story published in Wanted Comics No. 13 in 1948. It was drawn by Maurice del Bourgo. The entire story has been scanned at Pappy's Gold Age Comics Blog, No. 920, March 28, 2011.
- Issue No. 18 in September 1962 of Unknown Worlds, from American Comics Group, contained an 11-page story called "Witch Hunter of Salem", depicted on the cover, in which the minister who was hunting witches in Salem turned out to be one. Zev Zimmer (Script), C. C. Beck (Pencils), Pete Costanza (Inks); Cover by Ogden Whitney.
- Marvel Team-Up in 1976, included a 4-part serialized storyline (Issues Nos. 41–44) in which Spider-Man, Vision and the Scarlet Witch travel through time to Salem, 1692, to battle Dr. Doom —- who has enlisted the help of Cotton Mather – get entangled in the witchcraft accusations. Pages 11–16 in particular in issue No. 42, "Visions of Hate!," depict the historical episode.
- In Marvel's Fantastic Four vol. 1 #185, published in August 1977, the titular super-hero team discovers a hidden town in Colorado called New Salem in which the inhabitants are witches and warlocks, descendants of those who survived the Salem Trials. The inhabitants include Agatha Harkness, Nicholas Scratch and the Salem's Seven.
- Salem: Queen of Thorns is a 5-issue comic (Nos. 0–4), the first issue published in 2006 and the rest in 2008 by Boom! The entire series was later compiled into a single volume: Salem: Queen of Thorns in February 2009 (ISBN 1-934506-46-X).

=== Music ===
- The 1962 opera The Crucible with music by Robert Ward and a libretto adapted lightly from Miller's play.
- The second album by the indie rock band Liars, They Were Wrong, So We Drowned, is a concept album about the trials.
- Rob Zombie's album Educated Horses (2006) contains many references to the trials, mainly in the song "American Witch". His song, entitled "Lords of Salem", also was based on this.
- Jello Biafra had a side-project entitled The Witch Trials, and his work with the Dead Kennedys made a few references to them.
- Canadian progressive rock band Rush's song "Witch Hunt" (from 1981's Moving Pictures) is about how manipulators can use fear to "possess" the "ignorant" masses to their liking, much like the Salem townspeople during the Witch Hunts.
- American punk-rock band AFI has a song "Malleus Maleficarum" on their album Art of Drowning; the title is based on a book of the same name.
- American ska-punk band Big D and the Kids Table released an EP in 2005 titled Salem Girls, which contains the titular song that documents one of the trials.
- Neal Peterson mentions Alice Parker in his song "I wind my clocks / OneSixNineTwo". Peterson is a descendant of Parker.
- American death metal band Ishia have a song called "Witch Hunting in Salem".
- American metalcore band Unearth wrote a song about Giles Corey named "Giles" for their album III: In the Eyes of Fire.
- American black metal band Ceremonial Castings's 2008 album Salem 1692 is based on the events and two members of the band are direct descendants of Judge John Hathorne.
- Abigail Williams, an American symphonic black metal band from Phoenix, AZ, take their name from one of the accusers in the trials.
- "Hunting For Witches" by Bloc Party references the hysteria about witches in Salem and uses it as a metaphor for hysteria about immigration in contemporary Britain.
- "Burn the Witch" by Queens of the Stone Age is about the Salem Witch Trials.
- "The Dead Can't Testify" a song by Canadian rock group Billy Talent based on the Salem witch trials.
- "Under a Killing Moon" a song by the rock band Thrice talks about Salem Witch Trials and the innocent people burned in them.
- Swedish heavy metal band Wolf wrote a song called "Curse You, Salem", a song about the trials.
- Metalcore band Motionless in White released a song titled "Abigail" on their album Creatures about Abigail Williams and the Salem Witch Trials.
- The Clutch album Blast Tyrant contains the track "(Notes from the Trial of) La Curandera" which is, as stated, notes from a witch trial, and how she exacted her revenge
- The One-Eyed Doll concept album Witches is based on the trials.
- Melodic metalcore band The Raven Age released a song titled "Salem's Fate" on their debut album Darkness Will Rise.
- Texas rock Band Nothing More released the song "Salem", featured on their third studio album The Few Not Fleeting.
- Connecticut musician Dan Barrett from Have a Nice Life released music under the pseudonym "Giles Corey", including an album of the same name.
- Taylor Swift released a song "Mad Woman" about female rage, on her lockdown album Folklore referencing hunting witches. Swift also had a lyric on "I Did Something Bad" from her 2017 album Reputation also referencing hunting witches.
- The Boston Crusaders Drum and Bugle Corps 2017 production, "Wicked Games", was based on the trials.
- The Cincinnati-based doom metal band Lore released the song "Proctor's Ledge" on their self-titled debut, featuring lyrics reflecting the hanging and burning of accused witches.

=== Video games ===
- The 1997 game Castlevania: Symphony of the Night has an enemy called Salem Witch that sometimes drops Shortcake, possibly a reference to Witch cake.
- The 2013 game Murdered: Soul Suspect features the Salem Witch Trials as the motivation for a modern serial killer
- The 2014 online multiplayer strategy game Town of Salem is a more comical version of the Salem Witch Trials, set primarily to the theme of the "Mafia" party game. Its 2023 sequel Town of Salem 2 retains similar gameplay to the original, while staying truer to the time period and setting of the Salem Witch Trials.
- The 2015 video game Fallout 4, which depicts an alternate future of a post-apocalyptic Boston (referred to in-game as "The Commonwealth"), contains a reimagined version of the town of Salem, including a "Salem Museum of Witchcraft".
- Salem is one of "Epic of Remnant" chapter in Fate/Grand Order smartphone mobile game, briefly based on Salem, Massachusetts of the year 1692.
- The 2020 game The Dark Pictures Anthology: Little Hope takes place in the fictional town of Little Hope, which also had witch-burnings like Salem.
- In the 2022 game Marvel's Midnight Suns, the titular team's home base, the abbey, is located in a hidden pocket dimension in Salem. The abbey's proprietor Caretaker and her sister Litlith are shown to have been present and hunted during the Salem witch trials by a man named Hiram Shaw.

=== Internet ===
- In the web series RWBY, the character Salem, who is both the narrator and one of the main villains, is named after the town.
- "The Haunting of the Salem Witch Trials", released on May 26, 2017, is episode 8 of season 2 of BuzzFeed web series, BuzzFeed Unsolved: Supernatural, in which the trials and the theories that surround them are discussed, and the possible ghosts of Salem as a result of the trails are investigated.
- Joe Hegyes created a Gen Z comedy version of Abigail Williams for TikTok in 2020, which led to the 2026 web series "Abigail's Divine Comedy".

== Collectibles ==
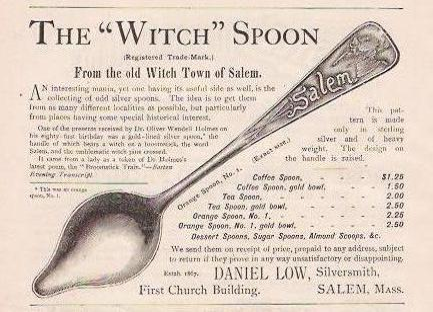
Advertisement c. 1891 for Daniel Low, Salem, MA

- Daniel Low, a jeweler in Salem, Massachusetts, began selling souvenir sterling "Witch" spoons in 1890, using two different patterns, the first with three pins, the word "Salem", and a witch on a broom. (See right)

== 19th-century illustrations depicting the episode ==
The story of Salem featured prominently in many publications in the 19th century about the 17th century colonial foundations of the United States. The illustrations continue to be reproduced widely in 20th and 21st century publications, in many cases without accurate attribution or reference to the century in which the illustrations were created. This gallery includes their citations and the names, where known, of the artists who created them.

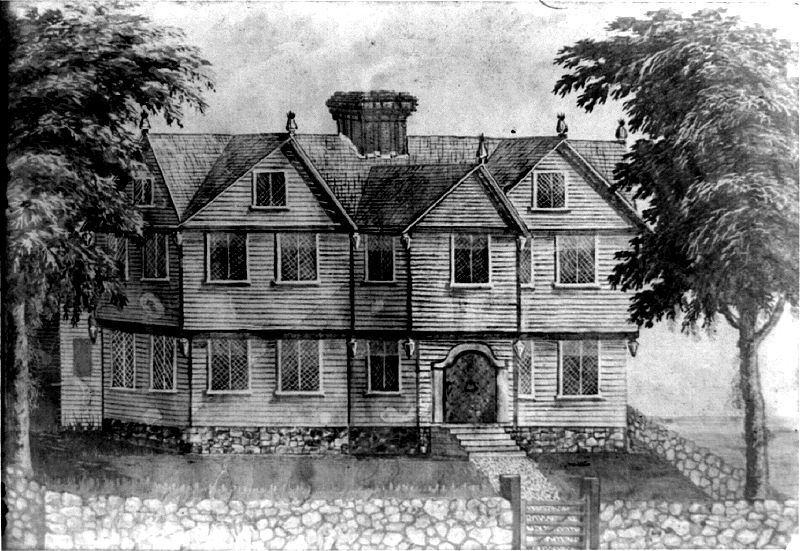
Jonathan Corwin's House, Essex St., Salem, MA; "A View of the house of the late Hon'ble Jonathan Corwin (Judge of the Supreme Court of Massachusets [sic] and member of the council appointed in the new charter, May 1692). Erected 1642, by Cap't. Geo. Corwin", circa 1859, Library of Congress, Ira J. Patch, Salem, Mass. This building, as the "Old Witch House", is open to the public, and is the only building left standing in Salem with ties to the witch trials.

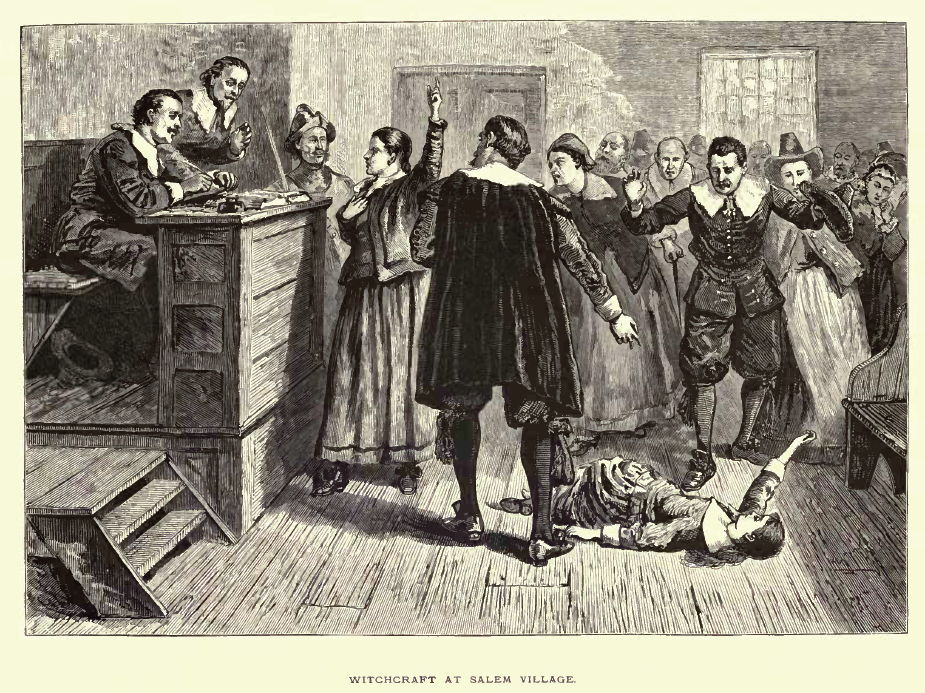
"Witchcraft at Salem Village", in Pioneers in the Settlement of America, Vol. 1, by William A. Crafts. Vol. I Boston: Samuel Walker & Company, 1876, p. 452; illustration likely by F. O. C. Darley or Granville Perkins (not specifically attributed)

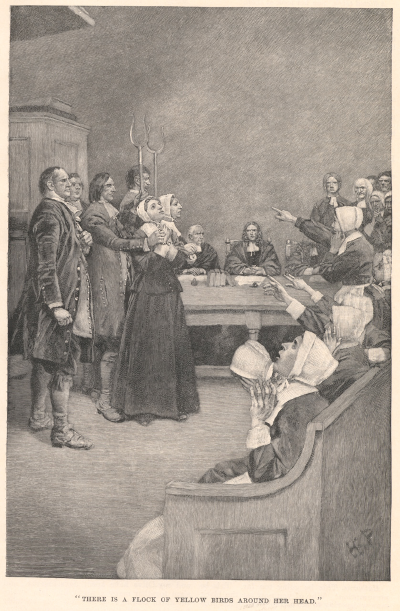
"There is a flock of yellow birds around her head." Engraved illustration by Howard Pyle, to accompany "Giles Cory, Yeoman," a play by Mary E. Wilkins, Harper's New Monthly Magazine, Volume LXXXVI, 1893, p. 31

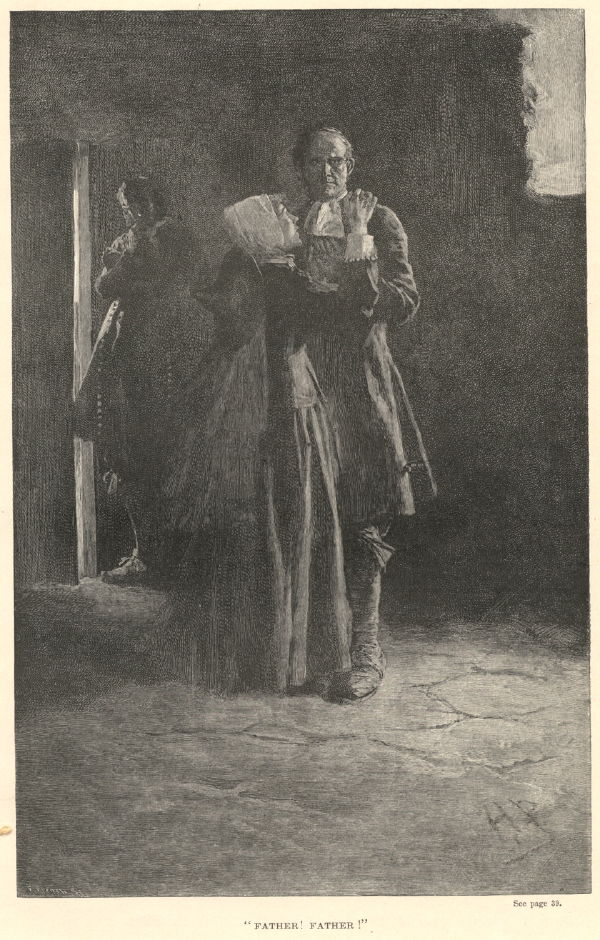
"Father! Father!" Engraved illustration by Howard Pyle, to accompany "Giles Cory, Yeoman," a play by Mary E. Wilkins, Harper's New Monthly Magazine, Volume LXXXVI, 1893, p. 33.

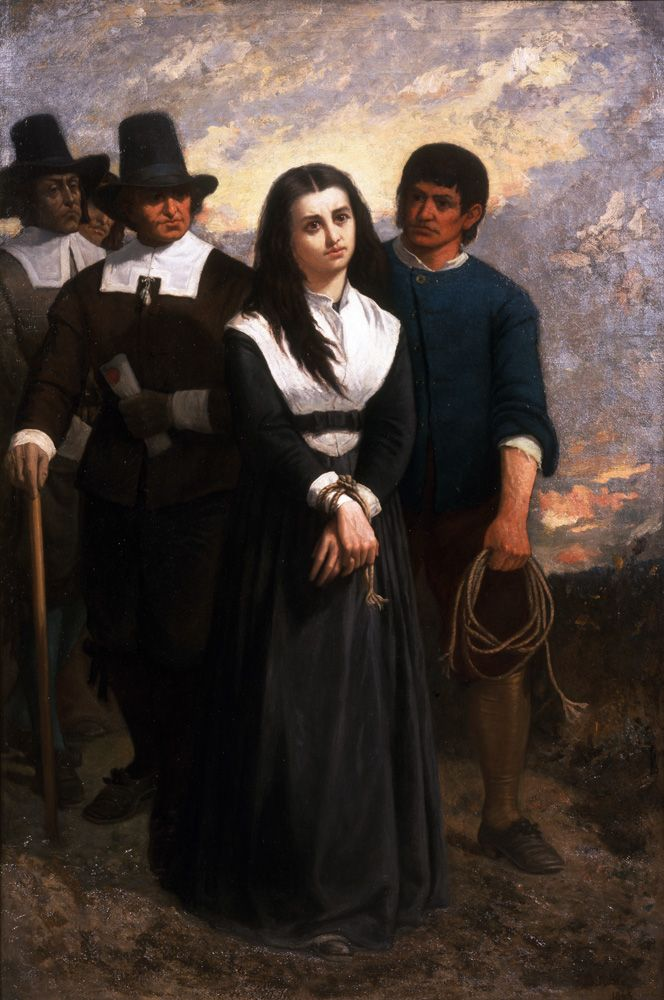
"Witch Hill (The Salem Martyr)," Thomas Satterwhite Noble, 1869. (Collection of the New York Historical Society)

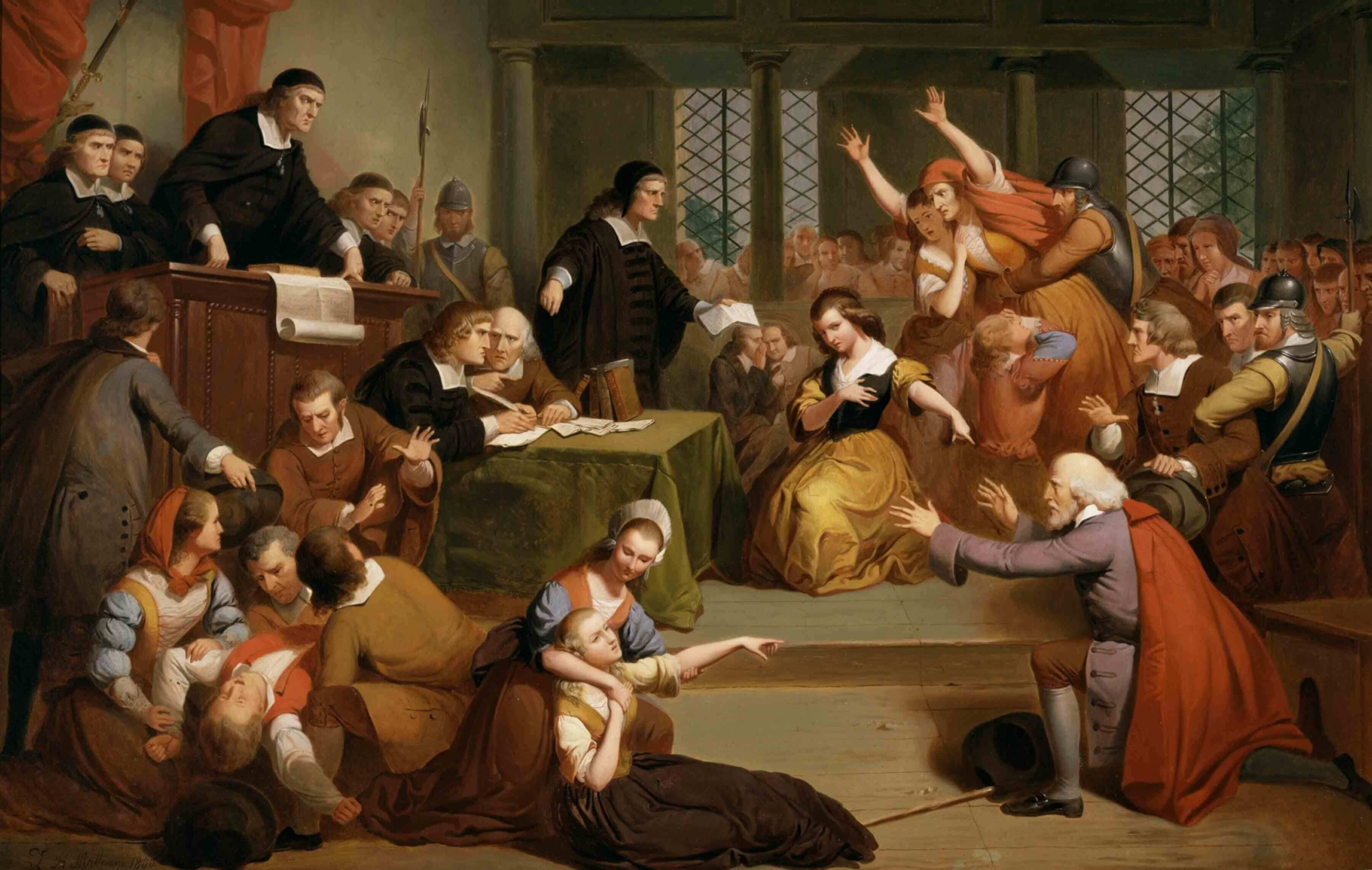
"Trial of George Jacobs, August 5, 1692," Thomkins H. Matteson, painter, 1855 (Collection of the Peabody Essex Museum)

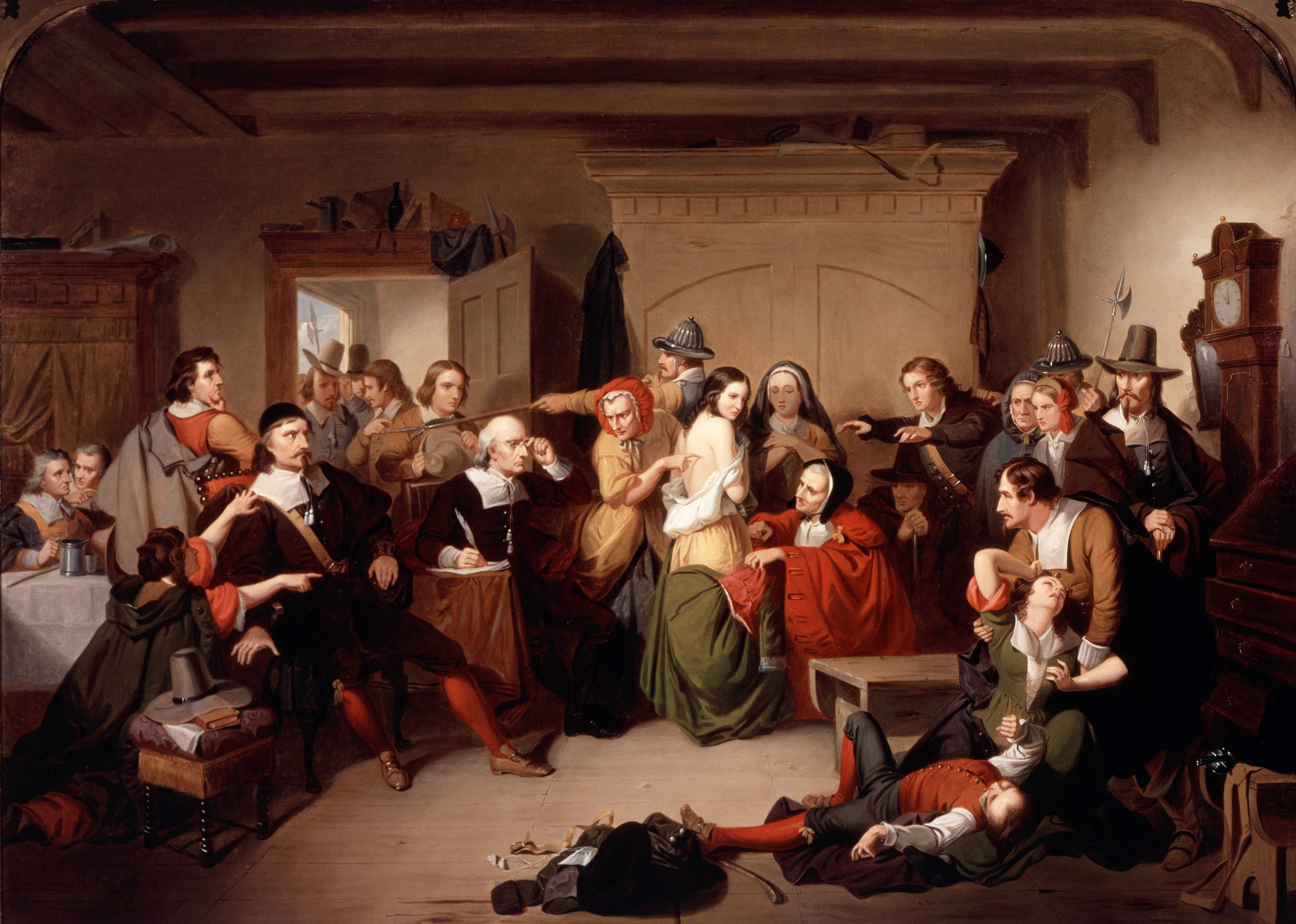
"Examination of a witch," Thomkins H. Matteson, painter, 1853 (Collection of the Peabody Essex Museum)

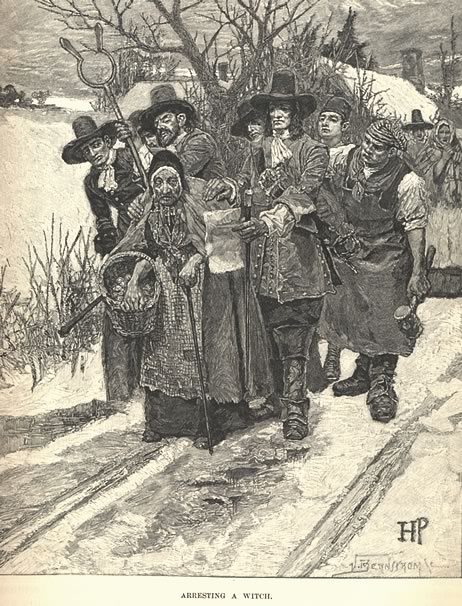
"Arresting a Witch" by illustrator Howard Pyle, to accompany "The Second generation of Englishmen in America," by T. W. Higginson, Harper's New Monthly Magazine, Vol. 67, (June – November), 1883, p. 221.

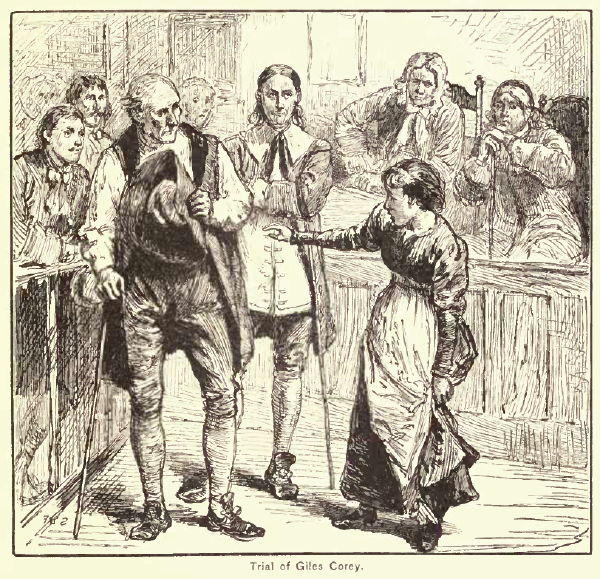
"Trial of Giles Corey" by illustrator Charles S. Reinhardt, in A Popular History of the United States, Vol. 2, by William Cullen Bryant, New York: Charles Scribner's Sons, 1878, p. 459.

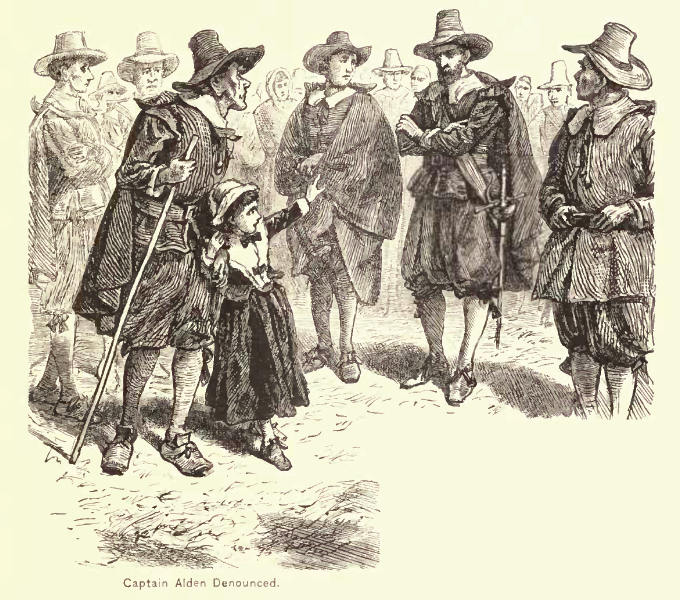
"Captain Alden Denounced", by illustrator Alfred Fredericks, in A Popular History of the United States, Vol. 2, by William Cullen Bryant, New York: Charles Scribner's Sons, 1878, p. 463

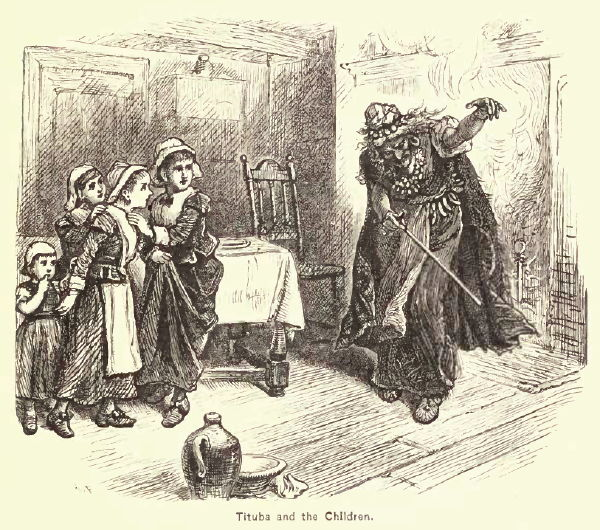
"Tituba and the Children", by illustrator Alfred Fredericks, in A Popular History of the United States, Vol. 2, by William Cullen Bryant, New York: Charles Scribner's Sons, 1878, p. 457

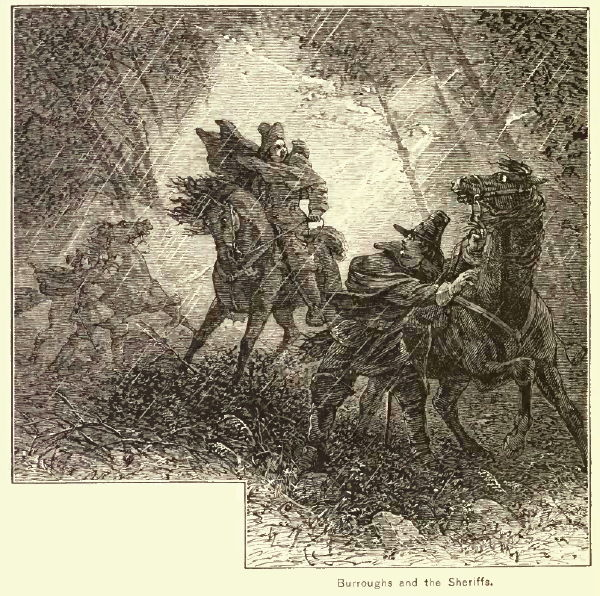
"Burroughs and the Sheriffs," by illustration Alfred Rudolph Waud, in A Popular History of the United States, Vol. 2, by William Cullen Bryant, New York: Charles Scribner's Sons, 1878, p. 470

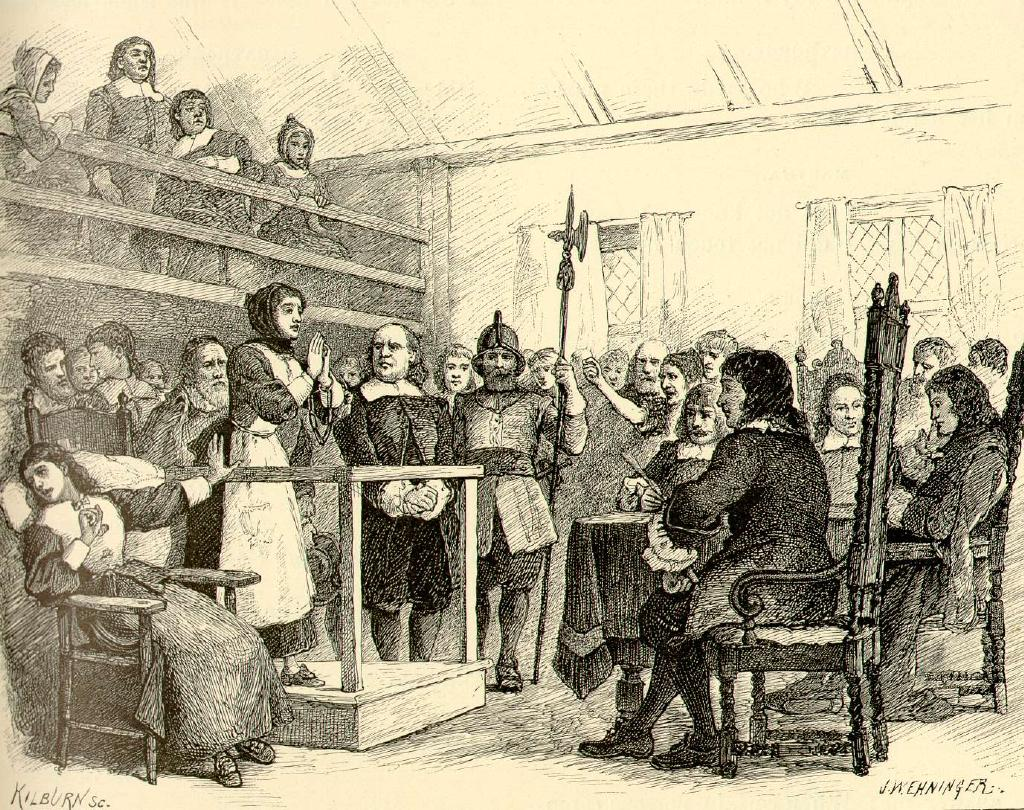
Martha Corey, illustration by John W. Ehninger, to accompany the play "Giles Corey of the Salem Farms" by Henry Wadsworth Longfellow, in The Complete Poetical Works of Henry Wadsworth Longfellow, Boston, Houghton, 1902

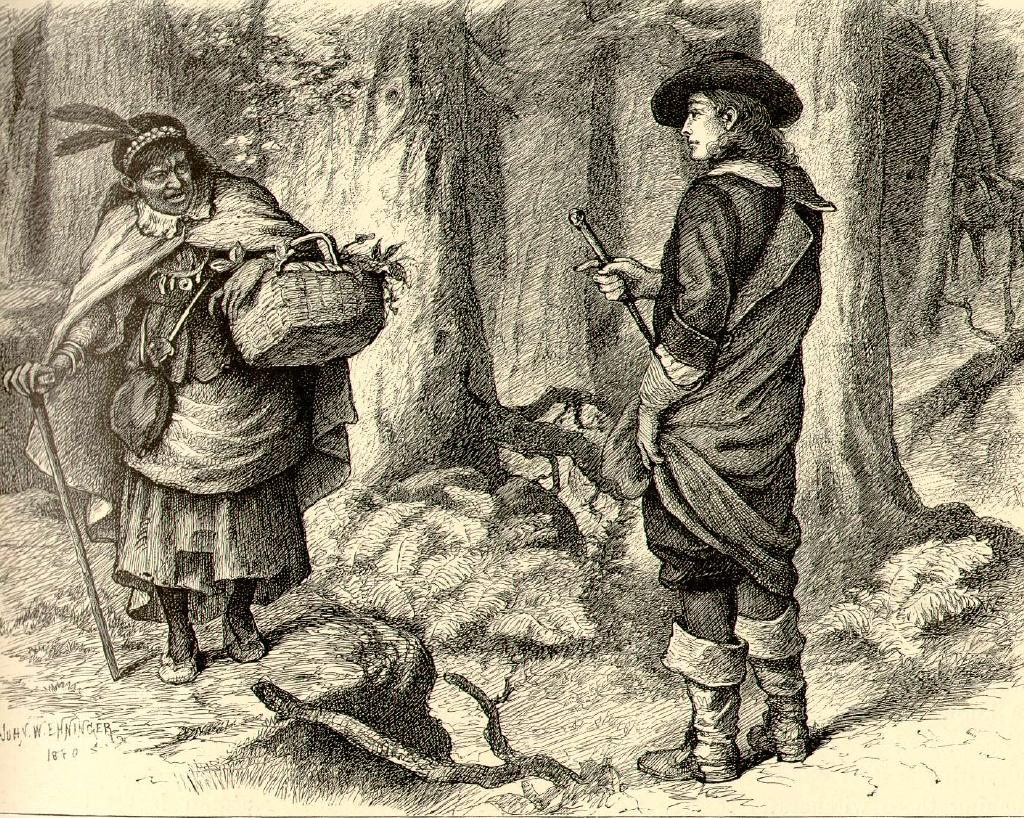
Tituba, illustration by John W. Ehninger, to accompany the play "Giles Corey of the Salem Farms" by Henry Wadsworth Longfellow, in The Complete Poetical Works of Henry Wadsworth Longfellow, Boston, Houghton, 1902

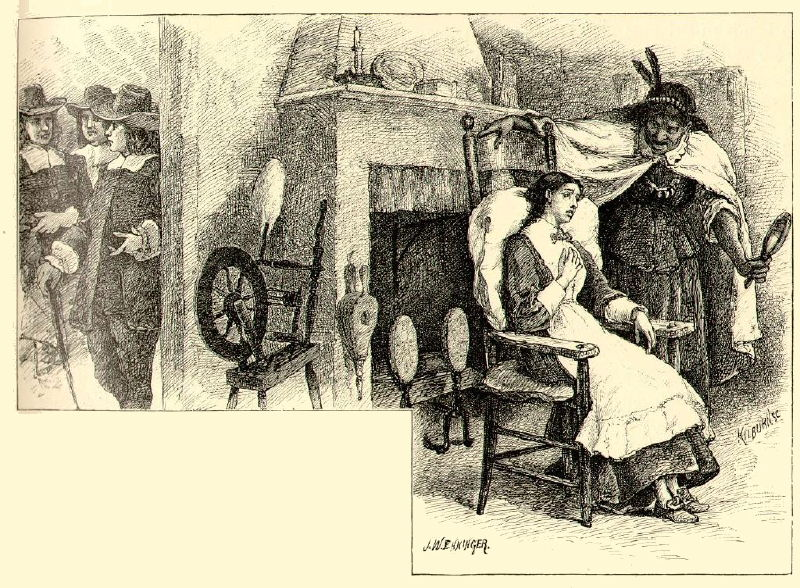
Tituba and Mary Walcott, illustration by John W. Ehninger, to accompany the play "Giles Corey of the Salem Farms" by Henry Wadsworth Longfellow, in The Complete Poetical Works of Henry Wadsworth Longfellow, Boston, Houghton, 1902

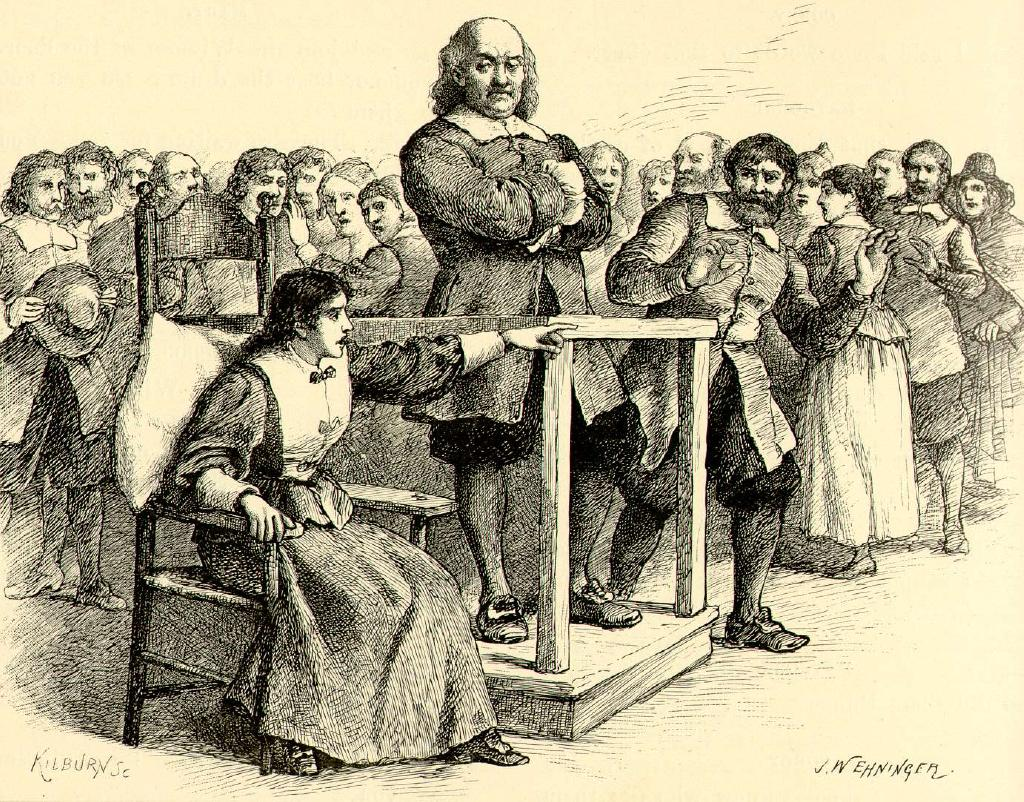
Mary Walcott accusing Giles Corey, illustration by John W. Ehninger, to accompany the play "Giles Corey of the Salem Farms" by Henry Wadsworth Longfellow, in The Complete Poetical Works of Henry Wadsworth Longfellow, Boston, Houghton, 1902

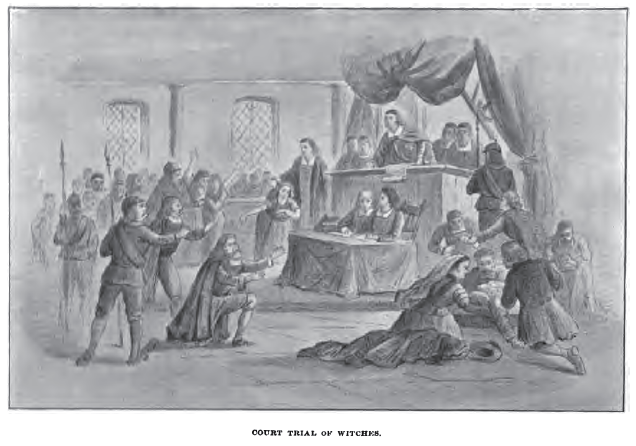
"Court Trial of Witches", illustrator unknown, in Witchcraft Illustrated by Henrietta D. Kimball, Geo. A. Kimball, publisher, Boston, 1892.

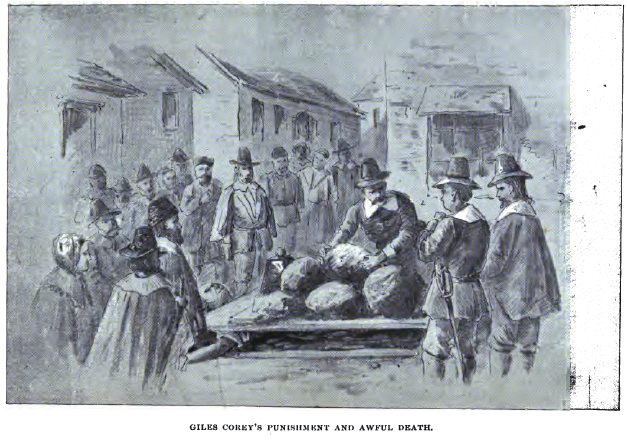
"Giles Corey's Punishment and Awful Death", illustrator unknown, in Witchcraft Illustrated by Henrietta D. Kimball, Geo. A. Kimball, publisher, Boston, 1892.

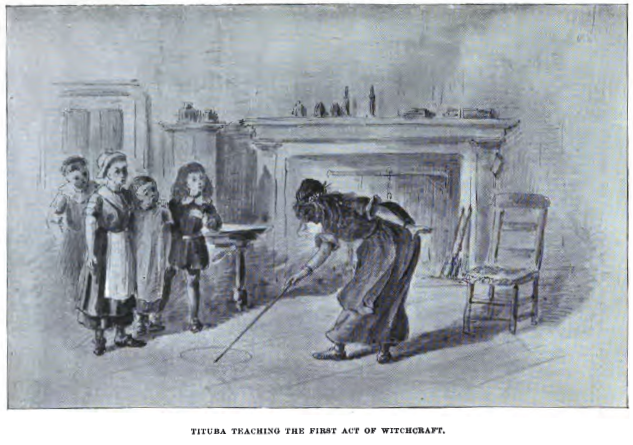
"Tituba Teaching the First Act of Witchcraft", illustrator unknown, in Witchcraft Illustrated by Henrietta D. Kimball, Geo. A. Kimball, publisher, Boston, 1892.

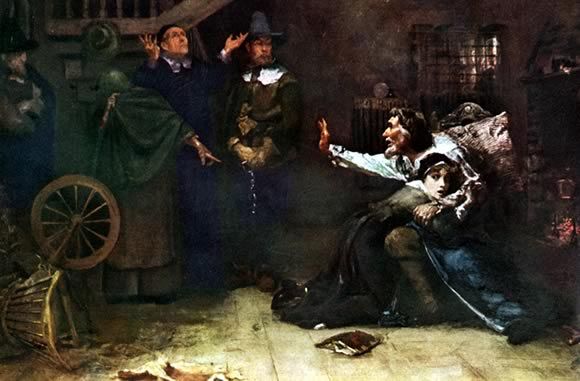
"Accused of Witchcraft," oil painting by Douglas Volk, 1884. (Collection of the Corcoran Gallery, Washington, DC)

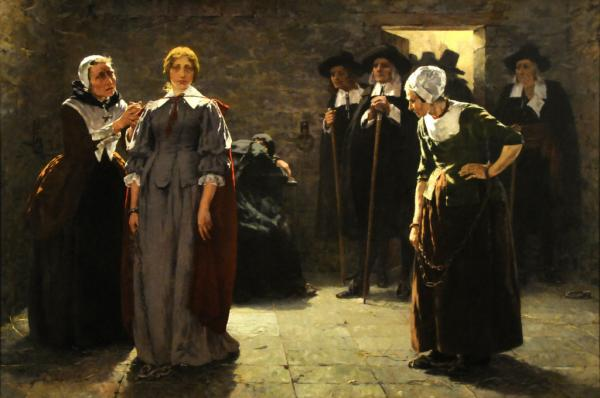
"The Witches," oil painting by Walter McEwen, c. 1892. (Collection of the Dallas Museum of Art)

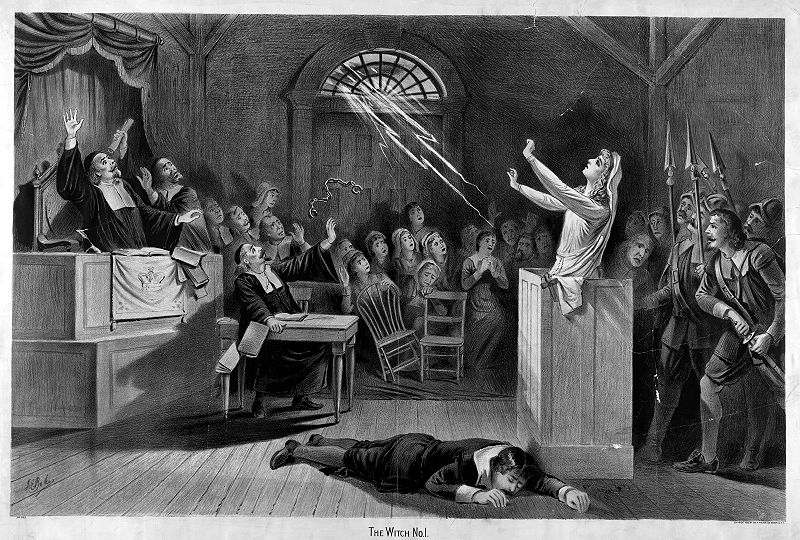
"The Witch, No. 1," lithograph by Joseph E. Baker, published by Geo. H. Walker & Co., c. 1892

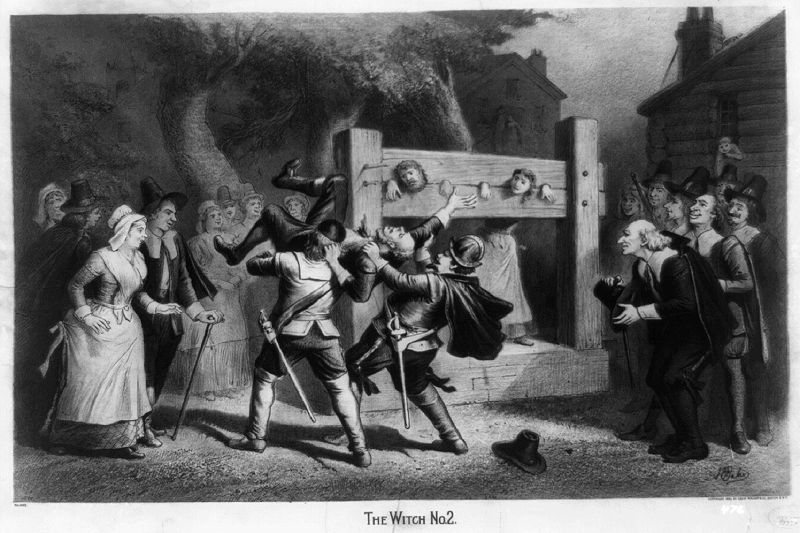
"The Witch, No. 2," lithograph by Joseph E. Baker, published by Geo. H. Walker & Co., c. 1892

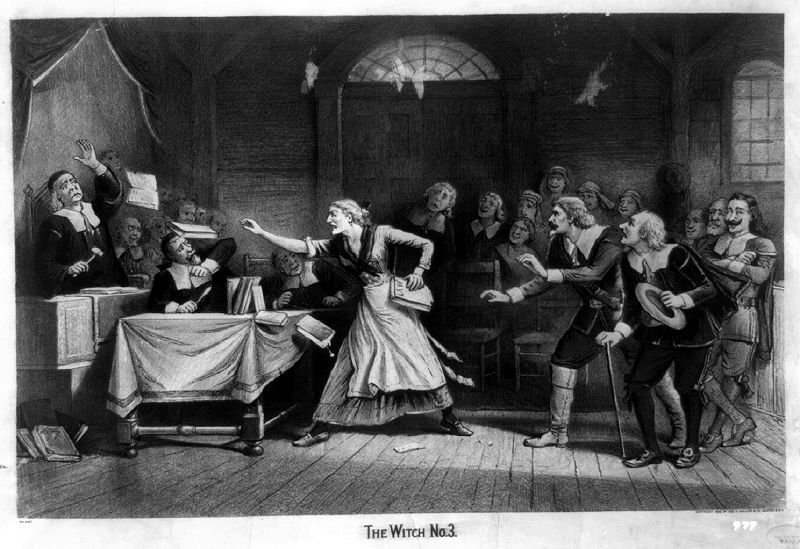
"The Witch, No. 3," lithograph by Joseph E. Baker, published by Geo. H. Walker & Co., c. 1892

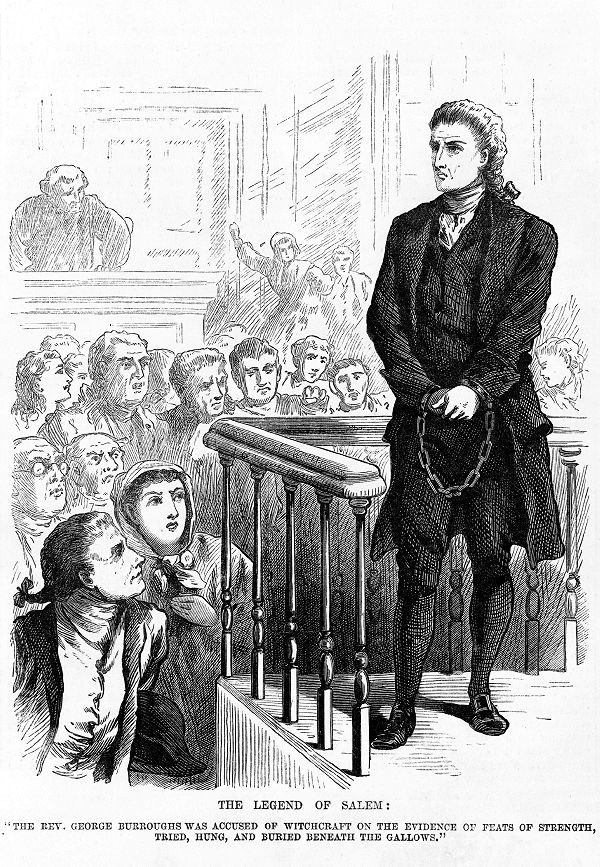
"The Legend of Salem: The Rev. George Burroughs was accused of witchcraft on the evidence of feats of strength, tried, hung and buried beneath the gallows," Illustration for "Some Legends of the New England Coast," Part III, by Harriet Prescott Spofford, Frank Leslie's illustrated newspaper, v. 31, (1871 Feb. 4), p. 345.

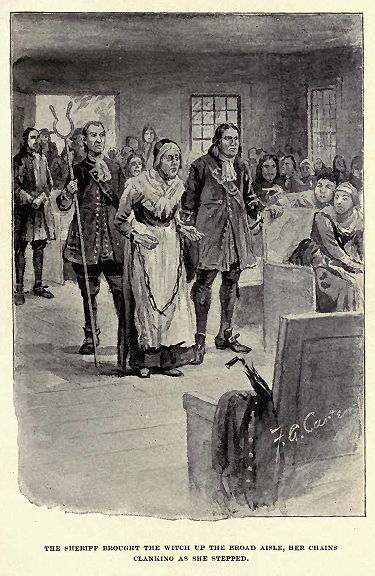
"The sheriff brought the witch up the broad aisle, her chains clanking as she stepped." Rebecca Nurse, as depicted by artist F.A. Carter in the historical novel, The Witch of Salem, or Credulity Run Mad, by John R. Musick. New York: Funk & Wagnalls Company, 1893. p. 275.

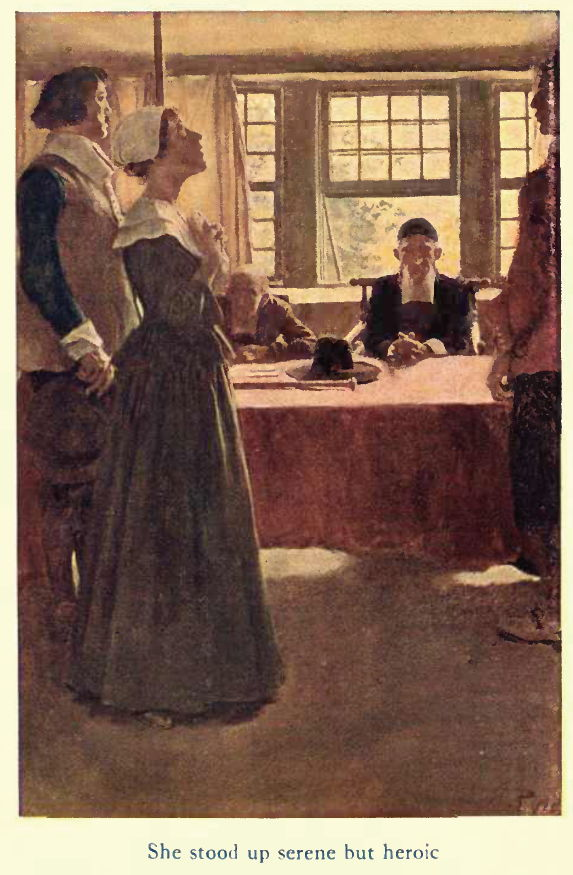
"She stood up serene but heroic", frontispiece, by Howard Pyle of fictional character accused of witchcraft, Dulcibel Burton, in Dulcibel: A tale of old Salem by Henry Peterson, Philadelphia: John C. Winston, 1907

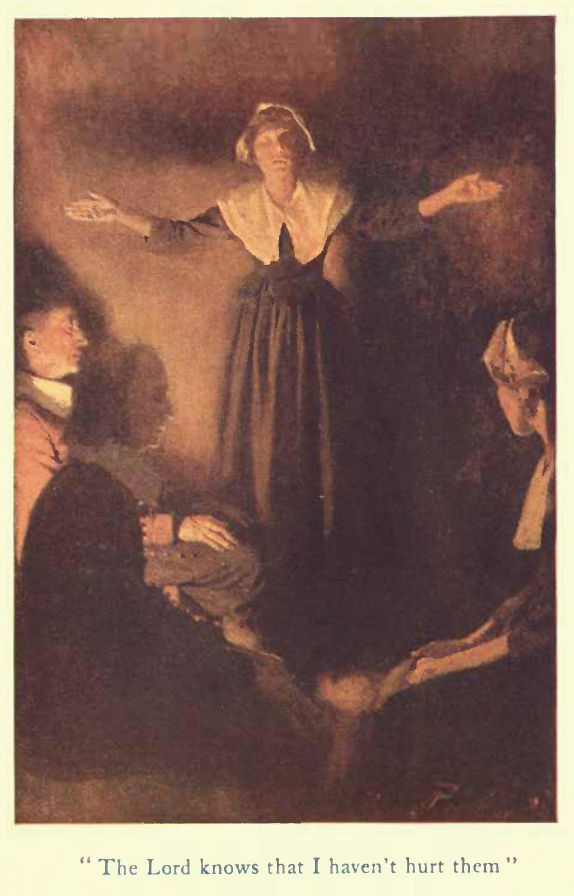
"'The Lord knows that I haven't hurt them'", p. 68, illustration by Howard Pyle of Rebecca Nurse in Dulcibel: A tale of old Salem by Henry Peterson, Philadelphia: John C. Winston, 1907

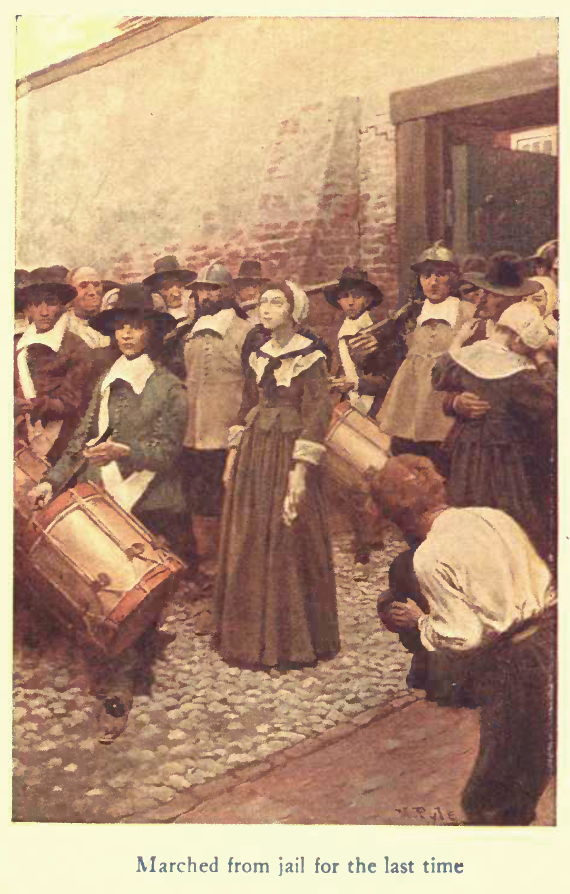
"Marched from jail for the last time", p. 208, illustration by Howard Pyle of fictional character accused of witchcraft, Dulcibel Burton, in Dulcibel: A tale of old Salem by Henry Peterson, Philadelphia: John C. Winston, 1907

== 19th- and 20th-century photographs of 17th-century buildings related to the episode ==
Although a few of the houses that belonged to the participants in the Salem witch trials are still standing, many of these buildings have been lost. This gallery includes photographs taken in the 19th century and early 20th century that preserve the visual record of these homes.

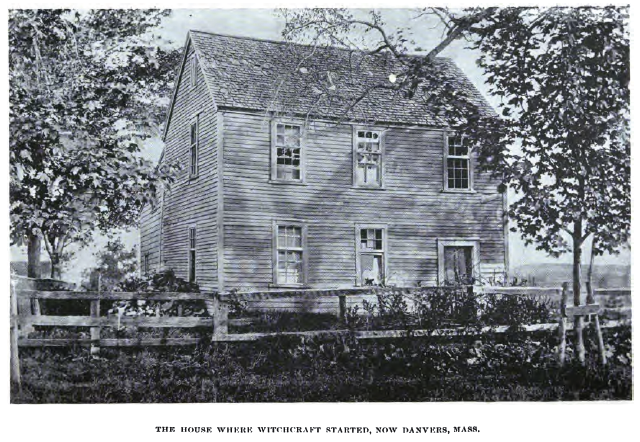
"The House Where Witchcraft Started, Now Danvers, Mass.", photographer unknown, in Witchcraft Illustrated by Henrietta D. Kimball, Geo. A. Kimball, publisher, Boston, 1892.

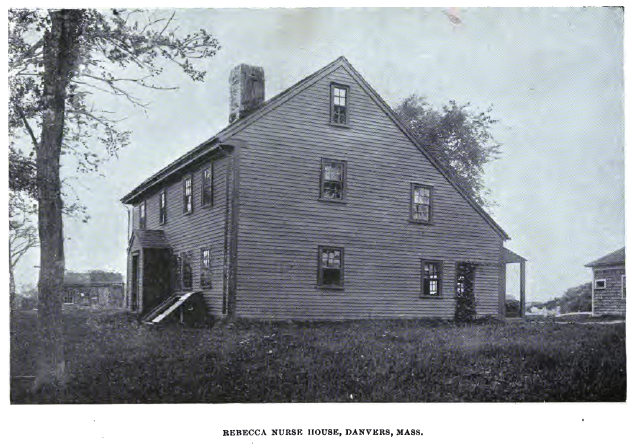
"Rebecca Nurse House, Danvers, Mass.", photographer unknown, in Witchcraft Illustrated by Henrietta D. Kimball, Geo. A. Kimball, publisher, Boston, 1892.

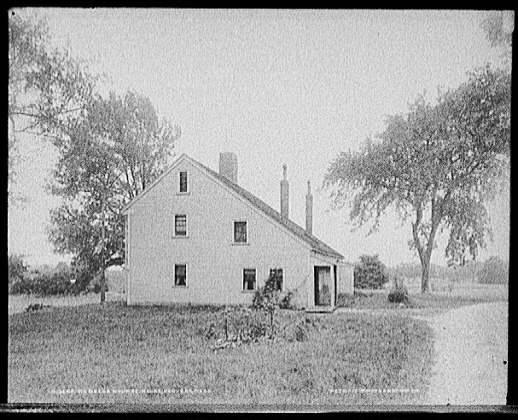
"Rebecca Nurse House," c. 1900–1906, Detroit Publishing Company.

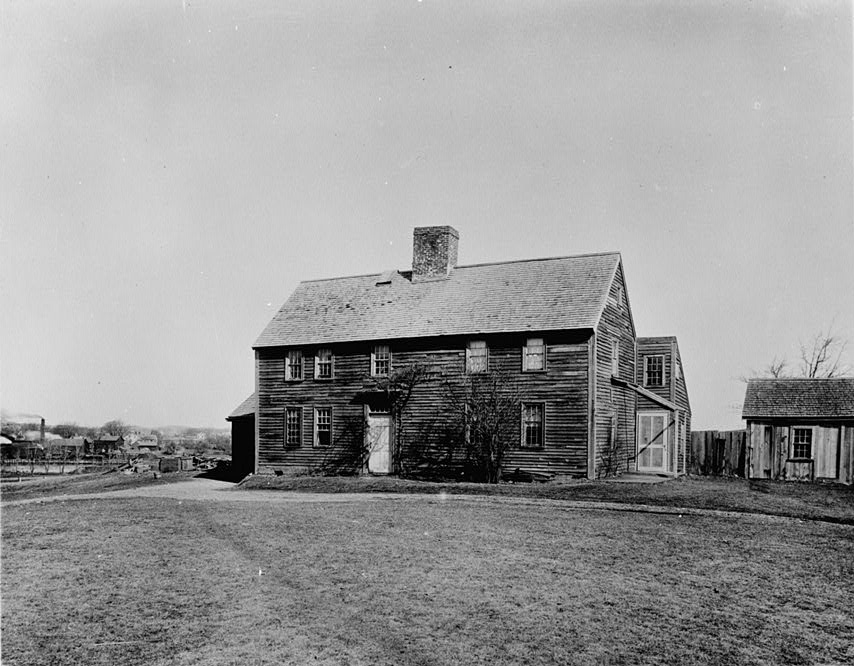
George Jacobs, Sr.'s House, Danvers, MA; front, looking northwest, from an old photograph by Frank O. Branzetti; Historic American Buildings Survey, Library of Congress, Prints & Photographs Division, HABS, Reproduction number HABS MASS,5-DAV,7-1. Date of original unknown.

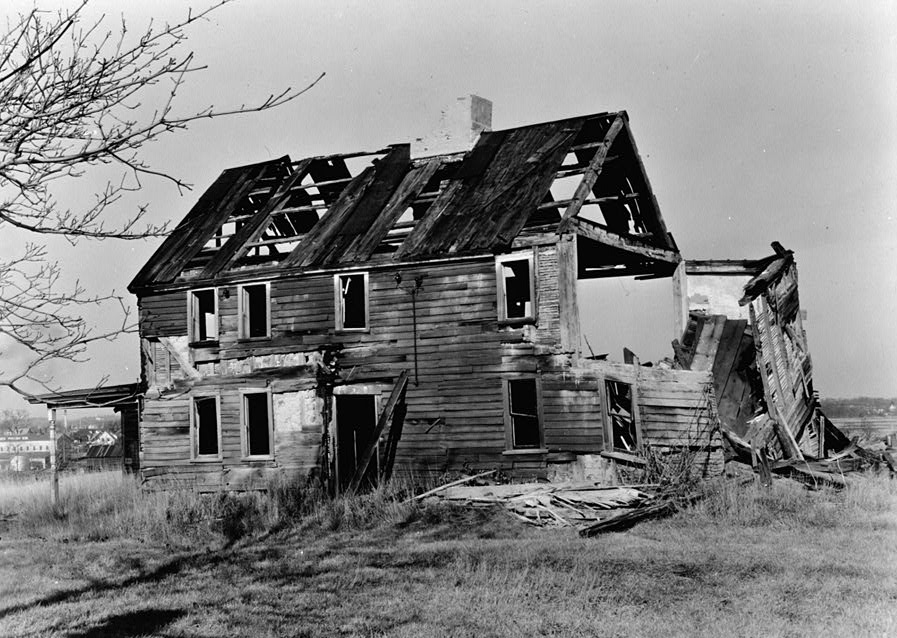
George Jacobs, Sr.'s House, Danvers, MA; front, looking northwest, Arthur C. Haskell, Photographer; Historic American Buildings Survey, Library of Congress, Prints & Photographs Division, HABS, Reproduction number HABS MASS,5-DAV,7-5. c. 1935.
