= Salem witch trials (disambiguation) =

The Salem witch trials were a series of hearings and prosecutions of people accused of witchcraft in colonial Massachusetts between February 1692 and May 1693.

Salem witch trials could also refer to:

== Media ==
- Salem (TV series), an American television series inspired by the Salem witch trials
- "Salem Witch Trials", an episode of History's Mysteries
- "Salem Witch Trials", an episode of In Search of History
- "Salem Witch Trials", an episode of Unsolved History
- Salem Witch Trials (film), a 2003 American-Canadian historical drama
- "Salem Witches", an episode of In Search of... (TV series)
- The Witch of Salem, a 1913 American silent short drama film

== Other ==
- Salem Witches (baseball), a baseball team in Lowell and Salem Massachusetts
- Salem witchcraft trial (1878), an 1878 lawsuit alleging witchcraft

== See also ==
- Connecticut Witch Trials, a series of witch trials which also occurred in New England
- Cultural depictions of the Salem witch trials
- List of people of the Salem witch trials
- Timeline of the Salem witch trials
