= Witch Hill (The Salem Martyr) =

1869 painting by Thomas Satterwhite Noble

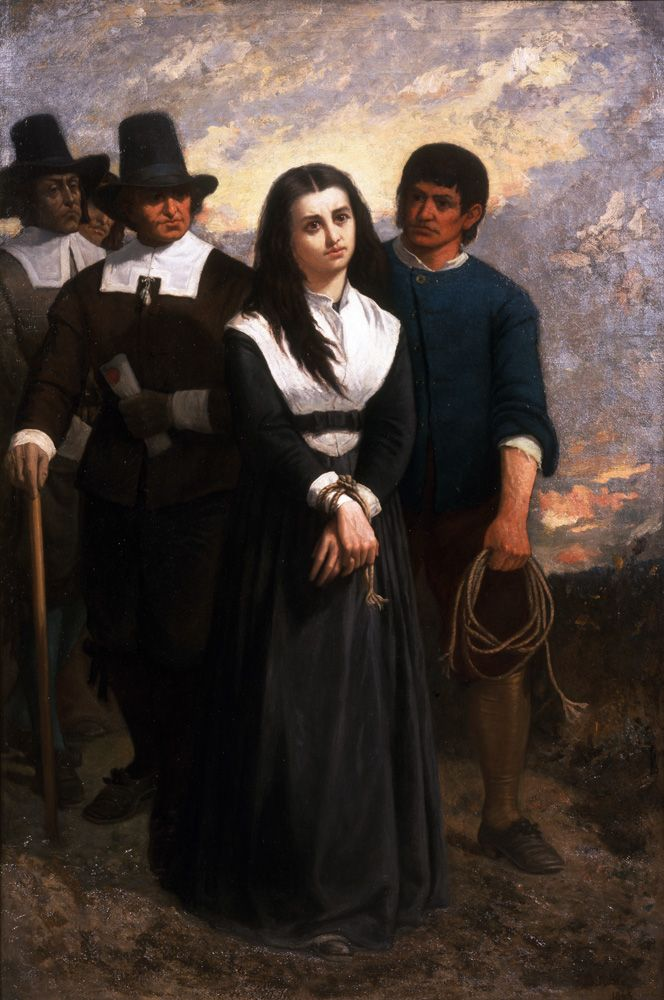
- Artist: Thomas Satterwhite Noble
- Year: 1869
- Medium: Oil on canvas
- Dimensions: 185.4 cm × 124.5 cm (73.0 in × 49.0 in)
- Location: New-York Historical Society

Witch Hill (The Salem Martyr) is an American painting of a young woman soon to be hanged for witchcraft during the Salem witch trials. The 1869 painting by Thomas Satterwhite Noble is held in the collection of the New-York Historical Society.

== Description and history ==
The painting depicts a young woman, her hands bound, walking on open ground, with four grim-looking Puritan men at her heels, escorting her to the gallows. Known for his sensational paintings on anti-slavery subjects, Noble depicted the Salem witch trials as unjust persecution, with the maiden's beauty and "saintly-looking expression" presenting her as a martyr in the Christian tradition of hagiography. This romanticized portrayal notwithstanding, most Salem witch trial victims were older women. First exhibited at the 1869 Cincinnati Industrial Exposition, Noble's painting won a silver medal.

For his model for the condemned witch, Noble posed a young woman who worked as a librarian in the Cincinnati public library. Family tradition maintains that she was a lineal descendant of a woman who was hanged as a witch in 17th-century Salem.

Noble painted the work using oil on canvas. The painting's heavy walnut frame was made for the canvas by English-American woodcarver William H. Fry.

Gifted to the New-York Historical Society by Noble's children in 1939, the painting was featured in a 2022 exhibition on witchcraft at the New York Historical.

== See also ==
- Cultural depictions of the Salem witch trials
