= Debtor Nation =

2011 book by Louis Hyman

Debtor Nation: The History of America in Red Ink
- First edition cover
- Author: Louis Hyman
- Language: English
- Genre: History
- Publisher: Princeton University Press
- Publication date: January 2011
- Publication place: United States
- Media type: Print Hardcover
- Pages: 392
- ISBN: 978-0-691-14068-1

Debtor Nation: The History of America in Red Ink is a book written by Harvard economic historian Louis Hyman and published by Princeton University Press in 2011.

== Argument ==
The book argues that in order to understand the rise of our contemporary debt-driven economy, we must look back at the history of American markets and American policy in the 20th century.

The book combines the methods of economic, business, political, and social history.

== Chapters ==
The book is arranged into nine chapters, spanning the twentieth century.

- An Introduction to the History of Debt
- Chapter One: Making Credit Modern: The Origins of the Debt Infrastructure in the 1920s
- Chapter Two: Debt and Recovery: New Deal Housing Policy and the Making of National Mortgage Markets
- Chapter Three: How Commercial Bankers Discovered Consumer Credit: The Federal Housing Administration and Personal Loan Departments, 1934–1938
- Chapter Four: War and Credit: Government Regulation and Changing Credit Practices
- Chapter Five: Postwar Consumer Credit: Borrowing for Prosperity
- Chapter Six: Legitimating the Credit Infrastructure: Race, Gender, and Credit Access
- Chapter Seven: Securing Debt in an Insecure World: Credit Cards and Capital Markets
- Epilogue: Debt as Choice, Debt as Structure

== In popular culture ==
Hyman's arguments in Debtor Nation inform his explanations of the financial crisis in David Sington's documentary The Flaw which premiered at the Sheffield International Documentary Festival in November 2010.

== See also ==
- Debt: The First 5000 Years a 2011 book by David Graeber
