= Katherine Howe =

American novelist (born 1977)

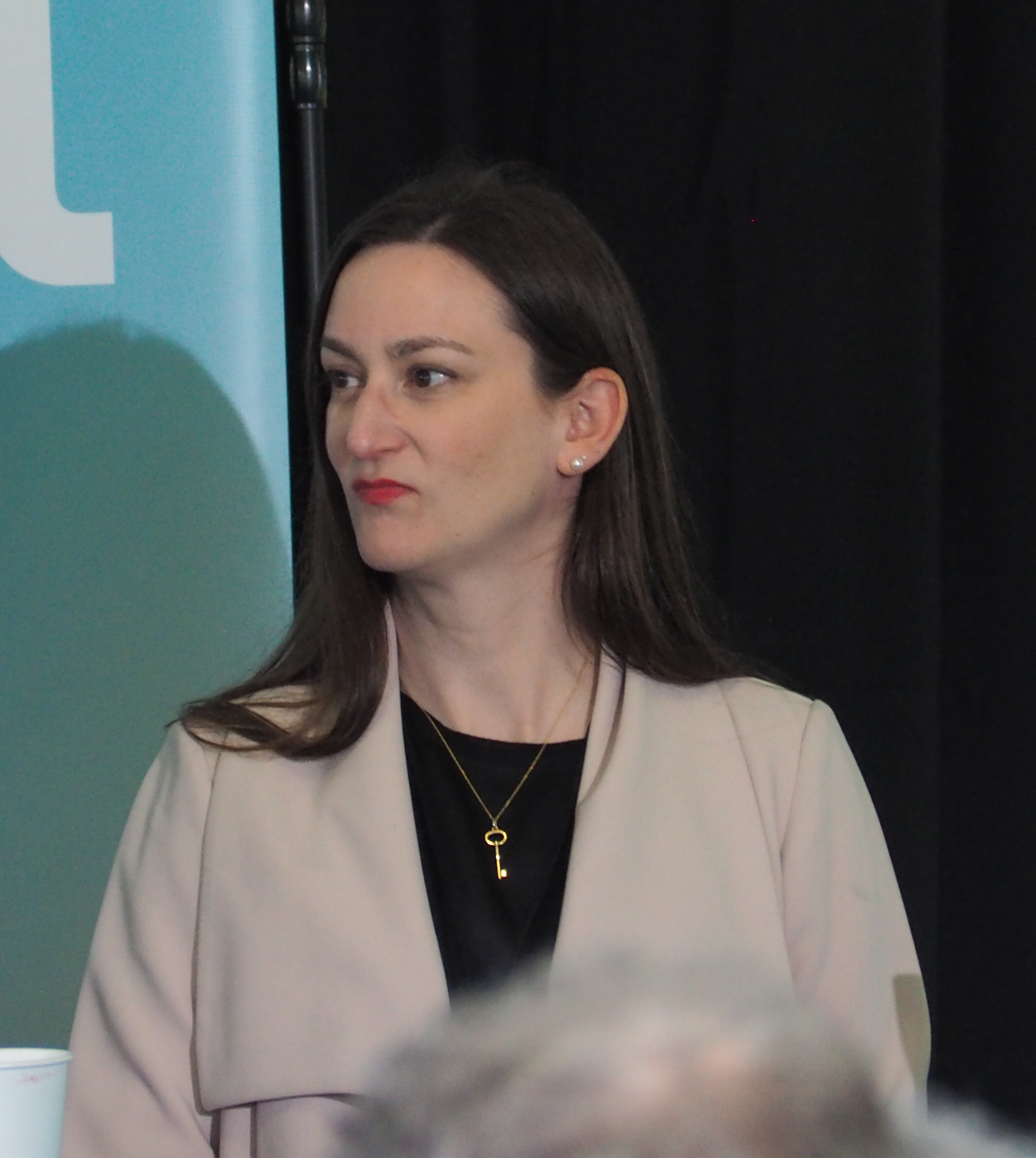
- Born: 1977 (age 47–48) Houston, Texas, U.S.
- Occupation: Novelist
- Education: Columbia University (BA); Boston University (MA)
- Genre: Historical fiction
- Spouse: Louis Hyman

Website
- www.katherinehowe.com

Katherine Howe (born 1977) is an American novelist who lives in New England and New York City. She specializes in historical novels which she uses to query ideas about "the contingent nature of reality and belief." Her debut novel was the New York Times Bestseller The Physick Book of Deliverance Dane (2009), related to the Salem witch trials. Its success led to her being a guest on several TV news shows, as well as "Salem: Unmasking The Devil" on the National Geographic Channel.

She has also written The House of Velvet and Glass, Conversion, The Appearance of Annie Van Sinderen (2015), and A True Account (2023). Her fiction has been translated into more than 20 languages.

== Biography ==
Howe was born and raised in Houston, Texas. Her mother is a longtime curator at the Museum of Fine Arts, Houston. Howe graduated from the Kinkaid School and earned her undergraduate degree in art history and philosophy at Columbia University. She began writing fiction while doing graduate work; she earned an MA in American and New England Studies at Boston University. She teaches at Cornell University.

In 2016, she was a fellow at the Center for Advanced Study in the Behavioral Sciences at Stanford University, where she was finishing a novel set "among the corsairs of the Gulf Coast that imagines Texas’s role within the broader Caribbean diaspora. It is tentatively titled The Galvez Grand. It will build on archival research about patterns of trade and settlement on Galveston Island in the 1820s while engaging with the legacy of magical realist fiction in the American Southwest and in Mexico."

Howe and her husband, the economic historian Louis Hyman (author of Debtor Nation), are core members of a group informally known as the "Springfield Street Table", This batch of Cambridge-area writers and scholars gather to play poker, while trading barbs and debating culture and ideas. The bestselling novelist Matthew Pearl, who also started writing fiction as a graduate student in English studies, is a core member of this group. He is sometimes credited with helping to launch Howe's literary career.

Howe's ancestors settled in Essex County, Massachusetts, in the 1620s. She is related to both Elizabeth Proctor and Elizabeth Howe, women convicted of being witches during the Salem witch trials. Proctor was spared because she was pregnant at the time of her scheduled execution, and later among prisoners released. Howe was executed. Another of her relatives was Edward Howe, a ship captain, and his wife Hannah Masury, who took over his ship after his death on a Pacific excursion in the 19th century. Hannah Masury is the great-aunt of Katherine Howe, and her story became the inspiration for Howe's 2023 novel A True Account, which tells the story of a woman dressing up as a cabin boy on a pirate ship, which she eventually takes command of.

== Bibliography ==
=== Fiction ===
Year	Title	Pages	Notes
2009	The Physick Book of Deliverance Dane	384	
2012	The House of Velvet and Glass	417	
2014	Conversion	432	
2015	The Appearance of Annie Van Sinderen	379	
2019	The Daughters of Temperance Hobbs	352	
2023	A True Account	288	

=== Non-fiction ===
Year	Title	Pages	Notes
2014	The Penguin Book of Witches	320	Editor
2021	Vanderbilt: The Rise and Fall of an American Dynasty	368	with Anderson Cooper
2023	Astor: The Rise and Fall of an American Fortune	336	with Anderson Cooper
