= Thomas Satterwhite Noble =

American painter (1835–1907)

- Born: May 29, 1835; Lexington, Kentucky
- Died: April 27, 1907 (aged 71); New York, New York
- Resting place: Spring Grove Cemetery, Cincinnati, Ohio
- Education: Oliver Frazier, George P. A. Healey, Thomas Couture
- Known for: Painting
- Notable work: The Modern Medea (1867); The Price of Blood (1868); The Sibyl (1896)

Thomas Satterwhite Noble (May 29, 1835 – April 27, 1907) was an American painter as well as the first head of the McMicken School of Design in Cincinnati, Ohio.

== Biography ==
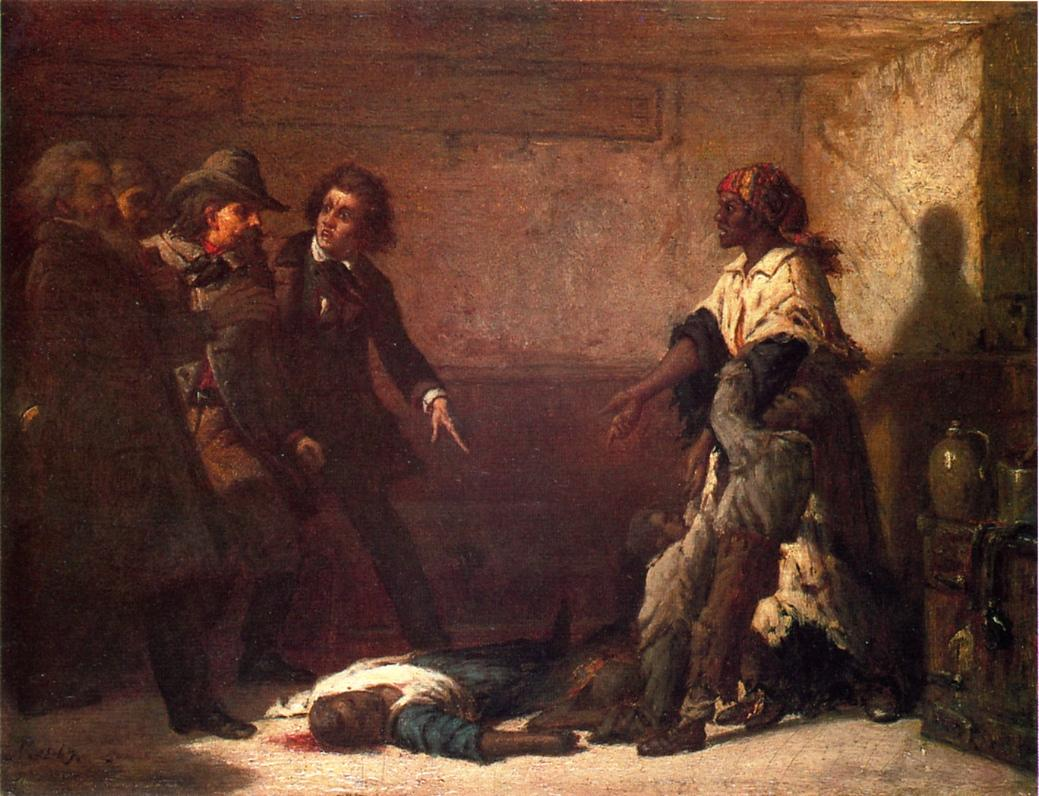
Margaret Garner/The Modern Medea

Noble was born in Lexington, Kentucky, and raised on a plantation where hemp and cotton were grown. He showed an interest and propensity for art at an early age. He first studied painting with Samuel Woodson Price in Louisville, Kentucky, in 1852 and then continued his studies with Price, Oliver Frazier and George P.A. Healey at Transylvania University in Lexington. In 1853 he moved to New York City before moving to Paris to study with Thomas Couture from 1856 to 1859.

Noble then returned to the United States in 1859 intending on beginning his art career. Though Kentucky was a slave state not in the Confederacy, with the beginning of the Civil War, as a Southerner, Noble served in the Confederate army from 1862 to 1865. After the war, Noble was paroled to St. Louis and began painting. With the success of his first painting, Last Sale of the Slaves, he received sponsorship from wealthy Northern benefactors for a studio in New York City. Noble lived in New York city from 1866 to 1869, during which time he painted some of his most well-known oil paintings. In 1869, he was invited to become the first head of the McMicken School of Design in Cincinnati, Ohio, a post he would hold until 1904. In 1887, the McMicken School of Design became the present-day Art Academy of Cincinnati. During his tenure at the McMicken School of Design, Noble moved briefly to Munich, Germany, where he studied from 1881 to 1883. He retired in 1904 and died in New York City on April 27, 1907. He is buried in Spring Grove Cemetery in Cincinnati.

== Exhibitions and major works ==
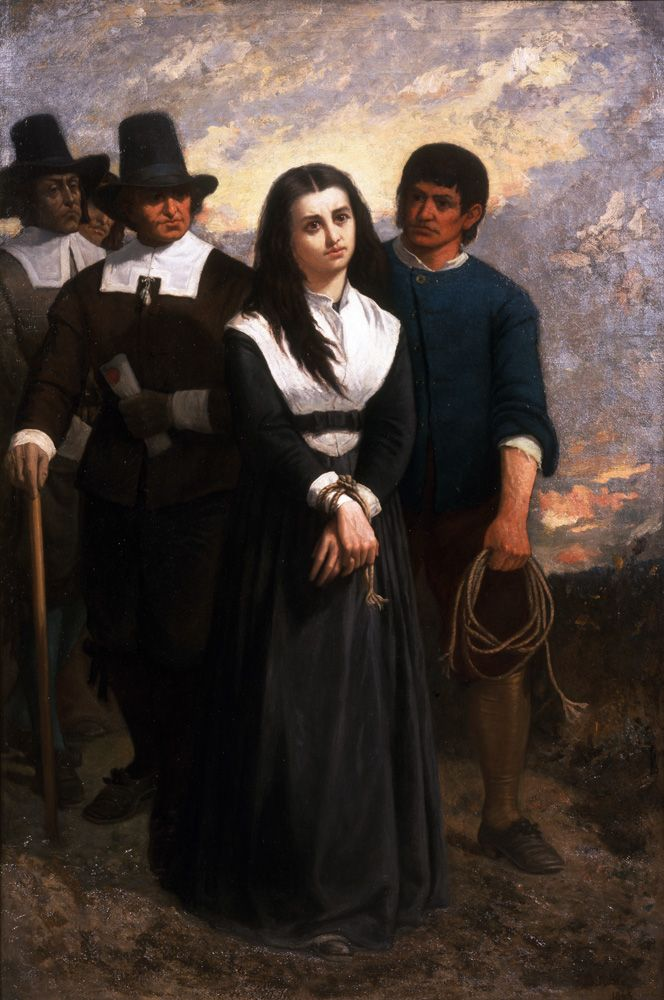
Witch Hill (The Salem Martyr), one of Noble's paintings

Noble's artwork has been exhibited in over 70 exhibitions, both during his lifetime and after his death. Most of his well-known initial works are historical presentations, painted to make strong political and moral commentary. Later in his life he painted many allegorical images, often having his children pose for figures in the paintings. After studying in Munich and towards the end of his life, Noble focused his artistic work on landscapes of Ohio and Kentucky countryside and Bensonhurst, New York.

Noble's well-known works are largely historical or social/political presentations. He is best known for a series of four anti-slavery paintings. Each depicts a specific horror of slavery: The first, Last Sale of the Slaves (1865) depicted the scene of the last sale of the slaves on the St. Louis courthouse steps. He followed this painting with John Brown's Blessing (1866) which depicted the abolitionist activist John Brown being led to his execution and blessing a child on the steps of the courthouse. His third painting, The Modern Medea (1867), portrayed the tragic event from 1856 in which Margaret Garner, a fugitive slave mother, murdered her children rather than see them returned to slavery. The picture is notable for Garner's expression of rage and for including the white slave hunters in the imagery. Noble's last painting, Price of Blood (1868), was not based on a specific historical event, but depicted a white slave owner selling his mulatto son. As with The Modern Medea, this painting is unique for the era for the inclusion of the white perpetrators in its imagery. Noble also sketched a well-known lithograph for Harper's weekly based on his John Brown's Blessing.

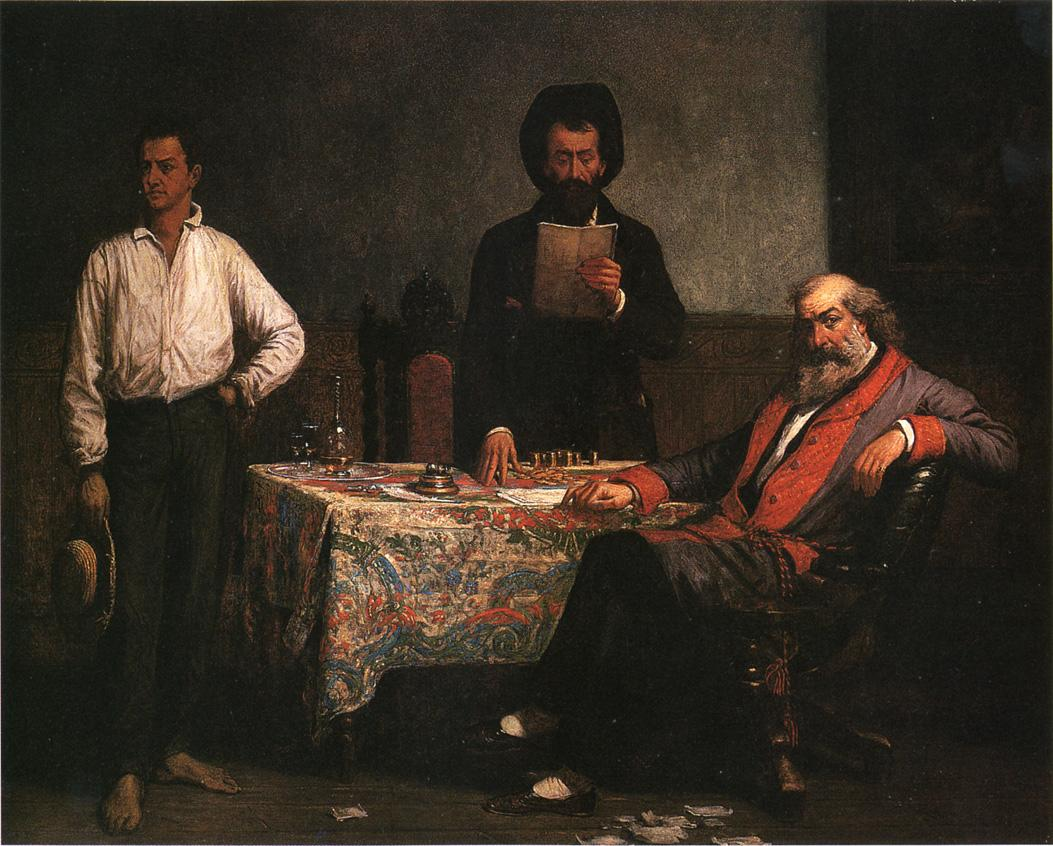

Known exhibitions

- 1866: St. Louis, Missouri, Pettes and Leathe Gallery
- 1866: New York, New York, National Academy of Design, 7th Annual Exhibition of the Artist's Fund Society
- 1866: New York, New York, National Academy of Design, 41st Annual Exhibition
- 1866: Boston, Massachusetts, DeVries Ibarra and Co.
- 1867: New York, New York, National Academy of Design, 42nd Annual Exhibition
- 1867: Boston, Massachusetts, Childs and Co.
- 1867: Washington, DC United States Capital
- 1867: St. Louis, Missouri, Pettes and Leathe Gallery
- 1867–68: Chicago, Illinois, Opera House Art Gallery
- 1868: Cincinnati, Ohio, Cincinnati Academy of Fine Arts, Wiswell's Gallery
- 1868: New York, New York, National Academy of Design, 43rd Annual Exhibition
- 1869: Boston, Massachusetts, Williams and Everett Gallery
- 1868–69:Cincinnati, Ohio, Cincinnati Academy of Fine Arts, Wiswell's Gallery
- 1869: Philadelphia, Pennsylvania, Pennsylvania Academy of Fine Arts, 46th Annual ExhibitioN
- 1870: Cincinnati, Ohio, Wiswell's Gallery
- 1870: Cincinnati, Ohio, 1st Cincinnati Industrial Exposition
- 1870: New York, New York, National Academy of Design, 45th Annual Exhibition
- 1871: Cincinnati, Ohio, Wiswell's Gallery
- 1871: New York, New York, National Academy of Design, 46th Annual Exhibition
- 1872: Cincinnati, Ohio, 3rd Cincinnati Industrial Exposition
- 1873: Cincinnati, Ohio, McMicken School of Design, 3rd Annual Exhibition
- 1874: Cincinnati, Ohio, Cincinnati Industrial Exposition
- 1875: Cincinnati, Ohio, Cincinnati Industrial Exposition
- 1875: Chicago, Illinois, Chicago Academy of Design
- 1875: Glasgow, Scotland, James McCure and Sons, 14 Gordon Street
- 1876: Philadelphia, Pennsylvania, Philadelphia Centennial Exhibition Art Gallery and Annex
- 1877: Cincinnati, Ohio, Wiswell's Gallery
- 1878: Cincinnati, Ohio, Women's Art Association, Loan Collection Exhibition
- 1879: Cincinnati, Ohio, Cincinnati Industrial Exposition
- 1880: Chicago, Illinois, Chicago Academy of Design
- 1887: Indianapolis, Indiana, Indianapolis Art Association, 4th Annual Exhibition
- 1888: Chicago, Illinois, Chicago Art Institute, 1st Annual Exhibition of American Oil Paintings
- 1891: Cincinnati, Ohio, Piper Gallery, 2nd Exhibition of the Cincinnati Art Club
- 1894–95: Lexington, Kentucky, Lexington Manufacturer's Exposition, Art Loan Gallery
- 1895: Atlanta, GA Cotton States and International Exhibition
- 1895: Cincinnati, Ohio, Spring Exhibition of the Cincinnati Museum Association
- 1896: Cincinnati, Ohio, Spring Exhibition of the Cincinnati Museum Association
- 1896: Cincinnati, Ohio, Music Hall, Loan Exhibition of Portraits
- 1896: Cincinnati, Ohio, Cincinnati Art Museum, Loan Exhibition of Portraits
- 1896–97: Pittsburgh, Pennsylvania, Carnegie Art Galleries, 1st Annual Exhibition
- 1896: Cincinnati, Ohio, Cincinnati Art Museum, Exhibition of Studies, Sketches, and Pictures in Watercolors
- 1897: Cincinnati, Ohio, Cincinnati Art Museum, 2nd Exhibition of the Society of Western Artists
- 1897–98: Detroit, Michigan, Detroit Museum of Art, 2nd Exhibition of the Society of Western Artists
- 1898: Chicago, Illinois, Art Institute of Chicago, 2nd Exhibition of the Society of Western Artists
- 1898: Indianapolis, Indiana, Indianapolis Propylaeum, 2nd Exhibition of the Society of Western Artists
- 1898: Detroit, Michigan, Detroit Museum of Art, 3rd Exhibition of the Society of Western Artists
- 1898–99: Cincinnati, Ohio, Cincinnati Art Museum, 3rd Exhibition of the Society of Western Artists
- 1899: Indianapolis, Indiana, Indianapolis Art Association, 3rd Exhibition of the Society of Western Artists
- 1899: Cincinnati, Ohio, Cincinnati Art Museum, 6th Annual Exhibition of American Art
- 1900: Cincinnati, Ohio, Cincinnati Art Museum, 7th Annual Exhibition of American Art
- 1901: Cincinnati, Ohio, Cincinnati Fall Festival
- 1905: Cincinnati, Ohio, Cincinnati Business Men's Club
- 1906: Cincinnati, Ohio, Cincinnati Art Museum, 13th Annual Exhibition of American Art
- 1907: Cincinnati, Ohio, Cincinnati Art Museum, "Exhibition of the Work of the Late Thomas S. Noble"
- 1908: Chicago, Illinois, Chicago Art Institute, "Paintings of Thomas S. Noble 1835–1907"
- 1908: St. Louis, Missouri, St. Louis Museum of Fine Arts, "Paintings by Thomas S. Noble, et al."
- 1910: New York, New York, Ralston Galleries, "Paintings by Thomas S. Noble"
- 1915: San Francisco, California, Panama-Pacific International Exposition, Department of Fine Arts
- 1923: Cincinnati, Ohio, Cincinnati Art Museum, "Special Exhibition of Former Cincinnati Artists"
- 1937–38: Cincinnati, Ohio, Cincinnati Art Museum, "50th Anniversary Exhibition of Work by Teachers and Former Students of the Art Academy"
- 1970: College Park, Maryland, University of Maryland Art Gallery, "American Pupils of Thomas Couture"
- 1979–80: Cincinnati, Ohio, Cincinnati Art Museum, "The Golden Age: Cincinnati Painters of the 19th Century Represented in the Cincinnati Art Museum"
- 1981: Lexington, Kentucky, University of Kentucky Art Museum, "The Kentucky Painter: From the Frontier Era to the Great War"
- 1984: Owensboro, Kentucky, Owensboro Museum of Fine Arts, "Kentucky Expatriates: Natives and Notable Visitors"
- 1987: Cincinnati, Ohio, Cincinnati Art Museum, "The Procter & Gamble Art Collection"
- 1987: New York, New York, Phillips Gallery, "Look Away, Reality and Sentiment in Southern Art"
- 1987: New York, New York, ACA Gallery, Visions of America 1787–1987: "200 Years of American Genre Painting in Commemoration of the Bicentennial of the US Constitution"
- 1988: Lexington, Kentucky, University of Kentucky Art Museum, "Thomas S. Noble 1835–1907"
- 1988: Greenville, South Carolina, Greenville County Museum of Art, "Thomas S. Noble 1835–1907"
- 1988: Cincinnati, Ohio, Art Academy of Cincinnati, "Thomas S. Noble 1835–1907"
- 1990: Washington, DC, Corcoran Gallery, Facing History: "The Black Image in American Art, 1710–1940"
- 1990: Brooklyn, New York, Brooklyn Museum of Art, "Facing History: The Black Image in American Art, 1710–1940"
- 2009.9.3: Oxford, Ohio, Miami University Art Museum "Figure and Form"
- 2015.3.25-2015.5.31: Greenville, SC, Greenville County Museum of Art, "Romantic Spirits: 19th Century Paintings from the Johnson Collection"
- 2016.1.13-2016.9.21: Greenville, SC, Greenville County Museum of Art, "Right Before your Very Eyes: Art + History"
- 2016: Highland Heights, Kentucky, Northern Kentucky University, Steely Library
- 2017.2.15- 2017.9.10: Greenville, SC, Greenville County Museum of Art, "In a Mirror, Darkly"

Major museum/collection holdings

- Allen Memorial Art Museum: The Present (1865)
- Chazen Museum of Art: Grandfather's Story (80th Birthday, The Old Sailor) (1895)
- Cincinnati Art Museum: Back to School (1859), Ohio Landscape (1890), Study Head of a Man (1865), Portrait of Joseph Longworth (1894), Portrait of David Sinton (1896), Landscape near T.S. Noble's House on Kemper Lane (unknown)
- The Filson Historical Society: Study for a Figure in Witch Hill (possibly self-portrait) (1867)
- Greenville County Museum of Art: The Sybil (1896), Cleaning Antiques (1904), Fugitives in Flight (1869)
- The Johnston Collection: Forgiven (1872)
- Kentucky Historical Society: The Last Communion of Henry Clay (1870) (also attributed to Robert Walker Weir)
- Missouri Historical Society: The Last Sale of Slaves in St. Louis (1870)
- Morris Museum of Art: Price of Blood (1868)
- National Academy of Design: Self Portrait (unknown)
- New York Historical Society: John Brown's Blessing (1867) and Witch Hill (1869)
- Underground Railroad Museum: Margaret Garner (The Modern Medea) (1867)
- Yale University Art Gallery: Blind Man of Paris (1895), Still Life-A Potted Plant (1875), Man in Brown Suite (from behind) (1870s)
