= Pauline Bradford Mackie =

American novelist

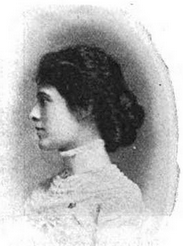
Pauline Bradford Mackie

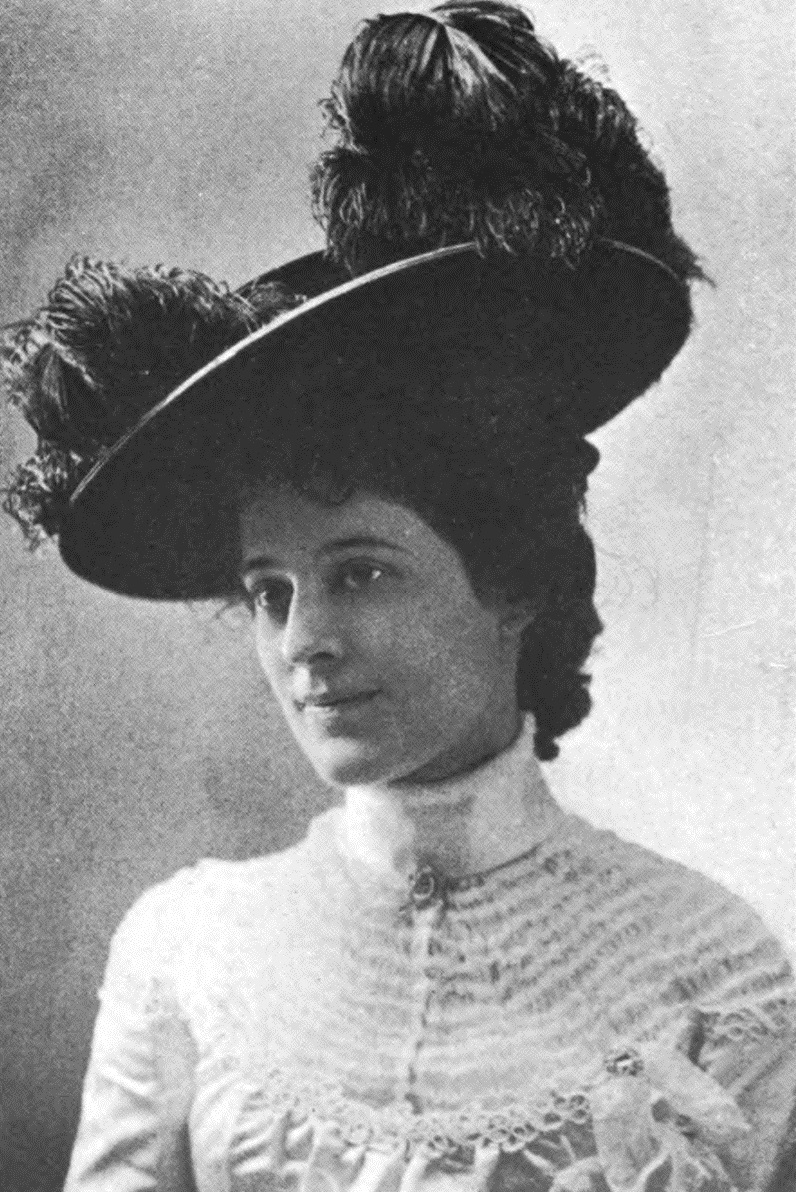
Pauline Bradford Mackie

Pauline Bradford Mackie (née, Mackie; after first marriage, Hopkins; after second marriage, Cavendish; July 5, 1873 - ?) was an American writer of historical novels and children's plays.

== Biography ==
Pauline Bradford Mackie was born in Fairfield, Connecticut, on July 5, 1873. Her father, Rev. Andrew Mackie, was an Episcopal clergyman. For two years after her graduation from the Toledo High School, she was engaged as a writer on the Toledo Blade. She soon abandoned this for a literary career, and most of her stories appeared in magazines and newspapers. Mademoiselle de Berny and Ye Lyttle Salem Maide were, after difficult experiences with publishers, printed in book form.

Hopkins removed to Berkeley, California, with her husband, Dr. Herbert Müller Hopkins (b. Hannibal, Missouri, 1870); he later became the chair of Latin in Trinity College, Hartford, Connecticut, In Berkeley, she wrote A Georgian Actress as well as two novels of Washington, D.C., life during the American Civil War.

The Washingtonians, with a frontispiece by Philip R. Goodwin, deals with Washington, D.C., official society in the early 1860s. The plot is based upon the career of a brilliant and well-known woman, who was at that time a power in official circles. Mademoiselle de Berny, with five full-page photogravures from drawings by Frank T. Merrill, is a historical story in which Washington is made to figure. A Georgian Actress, illustrated by E. W. D. Hamilton, is a historical novel dealing with the life of the early settlers in the Mohawk Valley, just before the American Revolution. The heroine is a daughter of Sir William Johnson, Superintendent of Indian Affairs in the Mohawk Valley. From the strange life in the wilderness the ambitious girl is transplanted to the happy life of the court of George III, and becomes famous as an actress in David Garrick's company. Ye Lyttle Salem Maide: a Story of Witchcraft, is a tale of the days of the reign of superstition in New England, and of a brave "lyttle maide" of Salem Town, whose faith and hope and unyielding adherence to her word of honor form the basis of the story. A convincing picture is drawn of Puritan life during the latter part of the 17th century. The Story of Kate - a Tale of California Life for Girls, contains illustrations by L. J. Bridgman. Kate is a California girl, whose university course has been interrupted, owing to her father's financial losses. The energetic Kate, not to be daunted by such difficulties, takes a district school in the mountains. The story recounts her experiences among the mountaineers.

A widow by 1917, on November 23, she married Harry Cavendish.
