= The Physick Book of Deliverance Dane =

Novel by Katherine Howe

- First edition cover
- Author: Katherine Howe
- Language: English
- Genre: Historical novel
- Publisher: Hyperion
- Publication date: 9 June 2009
- Publication place: United States
- Media type: Print Hardcover
- Pages: 384 pp
- ISBN: 1-4013-4090-3
- OCLC: 262886389

The Physick Book of Deliverance Dane (2009) is the first novel of American author Katherine Howe. It was published by VOICE, an imprint of Hyperion (publisher).
It debuted at number two on the New York Times Hardcover Fiction Bestseller list on June 20, 2009.

== Setting ==
The Physick Book of Deliverance Dane takes place in Cambridge, Salem, and Marblehead, Massachusetts, flashing back and forth between two time periods: during the Salem witch trials in 1692, and the summer of 1991. The latter was one year before events in Danvers and Salem to commemorate the 300th anniversary of the trials and honor the innocent victims.

== Plot summary ==
Harvard graduate student Connie Goodwin needs to spend her summer doing research for her doctoral dissertation. But when her mother asks her to handle the sale of Connie’s grandmother’s abandoned home near Salem, she can’t refuse. As Connie is drawn deeper into the mysteries of the family house, she discovers an ancient key within a seventeenth-century Bible. The key contains a yellowing fragment of parchment with a name written upon it: Deliverance (Hazeltine) Dane. This discovery launches Connie on a quest— to find out who this woman was and to unearth a rare artifact of singular power: a physick book, its pages a secret repository for lost knowledge.

As she begins to discover the pieces of Deliverance’s harrowing story, Connie is haunted by visions of the long-ago witch trials. She begins to fear that she is more tied to Salem’s dark past than she could have ever imagined.

== Reception ==
The book entered the New York Times Bestseller list at #2. Carolyn See in The Washington Post wrote, "This charming novel is both a tale of New England grad-student life in 1991 and the Salem witch hunts in 1692. The year 1991 is important here because historical data were not yet entirely computerized." It was a time when people were between technologies, and she likens it to the 1690s, before use of the scientific method.

Emma Carbone for the New York Public Library wrote: "...[the book] has a lot of appeal for a variety of readers. It is also a gripping story with a very interesting plot....Howe has created a fascinating commentary on one of America's most compelling and most infamous periods in history with this debut novel."

The book was ranked by USA Today as one of the 10 best novels of the year.
