= Louis Hyman =

American writer and economic historian (born 1977)

- Spouse: Katherine Howe

Academic background
- Education: Columbia University (BA); Harvard University (PhD)

Academic work
- Discipline: Economic history
- Institutions: Cornell University; Johns Hopkins University

Louis Roland Hyman (born 1977) is an American writer and economic historian. He is currently the Dorothy Ross Professor of Political Economy in History at Johns Hopkins University and a professor at Hopkins' SNF Agora Institute. Previously he was the Maurice and Hinda Neufeld Founders Professor in Industrial and Labor Relations at Cornell University's School of Industrial & Labor Relations.

== Education ==
After growing up in Baltimore, Maryland, where he attended McDonogh School, Hyman attended Columbia University in New York City. He graduated with a BA in history and mathematics.

Hyman was a 1999–2000 Fulbright Fellow at the University of Toronto, during which time he studied Canadian history.

In 2007, Hyman earned a PhD in American history from Harvard University.

== Career ==
Hyman revised his doctoral dissertation into a book during a fellowship at the American Academy of Arts and Sciences. The result, titled Debtor Nation: The History of America in Red Ink, was published by Princeton University Press in 2011. Choice named it one of the top 25 "Outstanding Academic Titles" for 2011.

Hyman has served as a consultant for global management consulting firm McKinsey & Company. His writings have appeared in such publications as Enterprise & Society, Reviews in American History, CNBC, Wilson Quarterly, and the New York Times.

His second book, Borrow: The American Way of Debt, which explained how American culture shaped finance and vice versa, was published in 2012.

After spending time as a lecturer at Harvard, Hyman now works at Cornell University's School of Industrial & Labor Relations. He continues to conduct research on the history of American capitalism. He also teaches an EdX massive open online course (MOOC) called American Capitalism: A History.

== Personal life ==
Hyman is married to the novelist Katherine Howe. His mother, Patty Kuzbida, is a retired laboratory technician and outsider artist whose works have been collected in the American Visionary Art Museum.

== Publications ==
=== Books ===
- Debtor Nation: The History of America in Red Ink (2011)
- Borrow: The American Way of Debt (2012)
- American Capitalism: A Reader (2014) with Edward E. Baptist
- Shopping for Change: Consumer Activism and the Possibilities of Purchasing Power (2017) with Joseph Tohill
- Temp: The Real Story of What Happened to Your Salary, Benefits, and Job Security (2018)

=== Articles ===
- "The Original Subprime Crisis." The New York Times. December 26, 2007.
- "Debtor Nation: How Consumer Credit Built Postwar America." Enterprise & Society, Volume 9, Number 4, December 2008, pp. 614–618.
- "The Architecture of New Deal Capitalism." Reviews in American History, Volume 37, Number 1, March 2009, pp. 93–100.
- "Ending Discrimination, Legitimating Debt: The Political Economy of Race, Gender, and Credit Access in the 1960s and 1970s." Enterprise & Society, Volume 12, Number 1, March 2011, pp. 200–232.
- "Laid Flat by Layaway." The New York Times. October 11, 2011. A23.

=== Chapters ===
- "American Debt, Global Capital." The Shock of the Global. Harvard University Press. (2010)
- "Rethinking the Corporation." What's Good for Business: Business in Postwar: Business and Politics in Postwar America. Oxford University Press. (2012)
