= Lois the Witch =

1861 short story collection by Elizabeth Gaskell

Lois the Witch and Other Tales is an 1861 collection of five stories by Elizabeth Gaskell. The book was published by Bernhard Tauchnitz in Leipzig.

The 1861 book's five stories are Lois the Witch (124 pages), The Grey Woman (78 pages), The Doom of the Griffiths (52 pages), The Half-Brothers (20 pages), and The Crooked Branch (63 pages). Lois the Witch is a long short story or novella of historical fiction, which first appeared in 3 parts in October 1859 in the weekly All the Year Round edited by Charles Dickens. The story's protagonist, Lois Barclay, is raised in a parsonage in Barford, Warwickshire but as she becomes a young woman, both her parents die. In 1691, she crosses the Atlantic to live with her uncle and his family in Salem, Massachusetts and then becomes involved in the Salem witch trials. The book's second-longest story The Grey Woman is a Gothic tale of a young woman who, with her lady's maid, escapes from the castle of her rich, but abusive, husband Monsieur de la Tourelle. The stories The Doom of the Griffiths and The Half-Brothers were published in the 1859 collection Round the Sofa after previous publication in periodicals. The Crooked Branch was first published as The Ghost in the Garden Room in the 1859 extra Christmas issue of All the Year Round as part of the "portmanteau" story The Haunted House.

The original manuscripts of The Grey Woman and The Crooked Branch are in the Elizabeth Gaskell Manuscript Collection of the John Rylands Library of the University of Manchester.
