= In Search of History =

US television program

- Created by: Gary Foreman and Frank Haney
- Narrated by: David Ackroyd
- Country of origin: United States
- No. of episodes: ~148

Production
- Running time: 1 hour

Original release
- Network: History Channel
- Release: 1996 – 2000

In Search of History is an American documentary television series that aired on the History Channel.

== Overview ==
The episodes of the series were produced from 1996 to 2000. Each season normally consisted of one-hour episodes (three episodes were two-hour) that focused on historical events or subjects.

Subjects typically covered on the show focused on incidents and individuals from ancient history. However more modern events such as an overview of Charles Ponzi and his schemes and the Hell's Angels were also covered.

Although new episodes are no longer being produced, re-runs of In Search of History are regularly shown on the History Channel. Additionally, they are available on DVD, when they were released on A&E Home Video through the History Channel Home Entertainment.

== Episode list ==
=== Season unknown ===
Episode # - Original Air Date - Title

- "In Search of History - A Deadly Deception":
- "In Search of History - Ancient Inventions":
- "In Search of History - Arabian Nights"
- "In Search of History - Asteroid"
- "In Search of History - Athens: Triumph And Tragedy":
- "In Search of History - Born Killers: Leopold and Loeb":
- "In Search of History - Cardiff Giant":
- "In Search of History - Charles Ponzi and His Scheme":
- "In Search of History - China's Forbidden City":
- "In Search of History - D-Day: The Best Kept Secret (Operation Bodyguard)":
- "In Search of History - Death Cult of the Incas":
- "In Search of History - Dragons":
- "In Search of History - Egypt's Great Queen":
- "In Search of History - England's Theaters of Blood":
- "In Search of History - Five Points Gang of New York":
- "In Search of History - Forgotten City of the Jungle":
- "In Search of History - Forgotten Wars":
- "In Search of History - Fountain of Youth":
- "In Search of History - Frankenstein":
- "In Search of History - Hells Angels":
- "In Search of History - Hitler and the Occult":
- "In Search of History - In Search of the Abominable Snowman":
- "In Search of History - Ishi, the Last of His Kind":
- "In Search of History - Karnak: Temple of The Gods":
- "In Search of History - Leopold & Loeb: Born Killers":
- "In Search of History - Lost World of the Etruscans":
- "In Search of History - Lourdes: Shrine of Miracles":
- "In Search of History - Machu Picchu: Lost City of the Incas":
- "In Search of History - Mercury 13 Female Astronauts":
- "In Search of History - Mexico's Great Pyramids":
- "In Search of History - Miracles":
- "In Search of History - Mystic Ruins":
- "In Search of History - Navajo Code Talkers":
- "In Search of History - Oracle at Delphi":
- "In Search of History - Pirates of the Barbary Coast":
- "In Search of History - Pompeii":
- "In Search of History - Pueblo Cliff Dwellers: The Anasazi":
- "In Search of History - Pyramids of Giza":
- "In Search of History - Quantrill's Raiders":
- "In Search of History - Roman Emperors":
- "In Search of History - Rome's Eternal Wonders":
- "In Search of History - Rome's Glorious Cities":
- "In Search of History - Salem Witch Trials":
- "In Search of History - Samurai Warrior":
- "In Search of History - Scourge of the Black Death":
- "In Search of History - Secrets of the Dinosaur Hunters":
- "In Search of History - Seven Wonders of the World":
- "In Search of History - Ship o' Gold":
- "In Search of History - Spies Among Us":
- "In Search of History - Stigmata":
- "In Search of History - The Aztec Empire":
- "In Search of History - The Bloody History of Human Sacrifice":
- "In Search of History - The Borgias":
- "In Search of History - The Boxer Rebellion":
- "In Search of History - The Celts":
- "In Search of History - The End of the World":
- "In Search of History - The Enduring Mystery of Stonehenge":
- "In Search of History - The First Americans":
- "In Search of History - The Gold of El Dorado":
- "In Search of History - The Great Train Robbery":
- "In Search of History - The Great Wall":
- "In Search of History - The Greek Gods":
- "In Search of History - The Heretic King":
- "In Search of History - The Hidden Glory of Petra":
- "In Search of History - The Holy Grail":
- "In Search of History - The Holy Lance":
- "In Search of History - The Infamous Dreyfus Affair":
- "In Search of History - The Knights of Camelot":
- "In Search of History - The Knights Templar":
- "In Search of History - The Maya":
- "In Search of History - The Missing Princes":
- "In Search of History - The Monkey Trial":
- "In Search of History - The Mormon Rebellion":
- "In Search of History - The Mysteries of King Tut":
- "In Search of History - The Mysterious Howard Hughes":
- "In Search of History - The Nazi Atomic Bomb Program":
- "In Search of History - The Night Tulsa Burned":
- "In Search of History - The Odessa File Nazi Fugitives":
- "In Search of History - The Piltdown Man":
- "In Search of History - The Plot to Overthrow FDR":
- "In Search of History - The Real Dracula":
- "In Search of History - The Real Newton Boys":
- "In Search of History - The Romanovs":
- "In Search of History - The Sphinx of Egypt":
- "In Search of History - The Trojan City":
- "In Search of History - The True Story of Sacco and Vanzetti":
- "In Search of History - Tibet's Lost Paradise: Shangri-La":
- "In Search of History - Tombs of Sipan":
- "In Search of History - Voodoo Secrets":
- "In Search of History - World Series Fix: The Black Sox Scandal":
