= The Crucible (1957 film) =

Historical drama film by Raymond Rouleau

- Original French film poster
- Directed by: Raymond Rouleau
- Screenplay by: Jean-Paul Sartre
- Based on: The Crucible by Arthur Miller
- Produced by: Raymond Borderie
- Starring: Simone Signoret; Yves Montand; Mylène Demongeot; Jean Debucourt; Pierre Larquey
- Cinematography: Claude Renoir
- Edited by: Marguerite Renoir
- Music by: Georges Auric; Hanns Eisler
- Production companies: Compagnie Industrielle Commerciale Cinématographique; Films Borderie; DEFA
- Distributed by: Variety Distribution
- Release date: 26 April 1957
- Running time: 145 minutes
- Countries: France; East Germany
- Language: French
- Box office: $12.7 million

The Crucible (French: Les Sorcières de Salem, lit. 'The Witches of Salem', German: Die Hexen von Salem, lit. 'The Witches of Salem' or Hexenjagd, lit. 'Witchhunt') is a 1957 French-language historical drama film directed by Raymond Rouleau with a screenplay adapted by Jean-Paul Sartre from the 1953 play The Crucible, by Arthur Miller.

== Plot ==
1692, Salem, Massachusetts. John Proctor is the only member in the town's assembly who resists the attempts of the rich to gain more wealth at the expense of the poor farmers, thus incurring the wrath of deputy governor Danforth. Proctor's sternly puritanical wife, Elizabeth, is sick and has not shared his bed for months, and he was seduced by his maid, Abigail. When he ends his affair with her, Abigail and several other local girls turn to slave Tituba. Reverend Parris catches the girls in the forest as they partake in what appears to be witchcraft. Abigail and the rest deny it, saying that they have been bewitched. A wave of hysteria engulfs the town, and Danforth uses the girls' accusations to instigate a series of trials, during which his political enemies are accused of heresy and executed. When Abigail blames Elizabeth Proctor, the latter rejects John's pleas to defraud Abigail as an adulteress. Eventually, both Proctors are put on trial and refuse to sign a confession. The townspeople rebel, but not before John is hanged with other defendants; his pregnant wife has been spared. Elizabeth tells the angry crowd to let Abigail live.

== Cast ==
- Simone Signoret as Elizabeth Proctor
- Yves Montand as John Proctor
- Chantal Gozzi as Fancy Proctor
- Mylène Demongeot as Abigail Williams
- Alfred Adam as Thomas Putnam
- Françoise Lugagne as Jane Putnam
- Raymond Rouleau as Thomas Danforth
- Pierre Larquey as Francis Nurse
- Marguerite Coutan-Lambert as Rebecca Nurse
- Jean Debucourt as Samuel Parris
- Darling Legitimus as Tituba
- Michel Piccoli as James Putnam
- Gerd Michael Henneberg as Joseph Herrick
- Yves Brainville as John Hale
- Pascale Petit as Mary Warren
- Véronique Nordey as Mercy Lewis
- Jeanne Fusier-Gir as Martha Corey
- Jean Gaven as Peter Corey
- Aribert Grimmer as Giles Corey
- Alexandre Rignault as Samuel Willard
- Pâquerette (Marguerite Jeanne Martine Puech) as Sarah Good
- Gérard Darrieu as Ezekiel Cheever
- François Joux as Judge
- Sabine Thalbach as Kitty
- Ursula Körbs as Wollit
- Hans Klering as Field

== Production ==
Jean-Paul Sartre began writing the script in late 1955, during what author David Caute defined as "the height of his rapprochement with the Soviet Union". He was inspired by the success of Marcel Aymé's French-language adaptation of Miller's The Crucible, titled Les sorcières de Salem, which was staged in Paris' Sarah Bernhardt Theater, starring Simone Signoret as Elizabeth Proctor. Sartre later said he was moved to write his adaptation because "the play showed John Proctor persecuted, but no one knows why... His death seems like a purely ethical act, rather than one of freedom, that is undertaken in order to resist the situation effectively. In Miller's play... Each of us can see what he wants, each public will find in it confirmation of its own attitude... Because the real political and social implications of the witch-hunt don't appear clearly." The screenplay was 300 pages long. Sartre's version was different from the original play in many ways; Elizabeth saves Abigail from lynching and the townspeople rise up against Thomas Danforth, who becomes the chief antagonist.

The film was one of four major Franco-East German co-productions made during the late 1950s - the others were Till Ulenspiegel's Adventures, Les Misérables and Les Arrivistes. The Democratic Republic's government authorized the DEFA studio to collaborate with companies outside the Eastern Bloc in order to gain access to Western audiences, thus bypassing the limitations imposed by West Germany's Hallstein Doctrine; eventually, they intended their films to reach also the public in the Federal Republic. The French, on their part, were interested in reducing costs by filming in East Germany. Principal photography took place in DEFA's Babelsberg Studios from August to mid-October 1956, with additional shooting in Paris during early November.

Pascale Petit made her debut in the film. She was discovered working as a hairdress by Françoise Lugagne who recommended her to her husband Raymond Rouleau.

The sets and costumes were designed by Lila de Nobili and Rostislav Doboujinsky.

== Reception ==
Les Sorcières de Salem sold 1,686,749 tickets. For their appearance in it, Signoret won the 1957 BAFTA Award for Best Foreign Actress and Mylène Demongeot was nominated for the BAFTA Award for Most Promising Newcomer to Film in the same year. In the 1957 Karlovy Vary International Film Festival, the Best Actor Award was given to "all actors of Les Sorcières de Salem in collective, and especially to Yves Montand."

The New York Times film critic Bosley Crowther wrote: "out of The Crucible... Jean-Paul Sartre and Raymond Rouleau have got a powerful and compelling film... For now Mr. Miller's somewhat cramped and peculiarly parochial account... comes forth as a sort of timeless drama... This is a persistently absorbing film." Time magazine's reviewer commented that "Witches of Salem is a foredoomed but fascinating attempt... But it hardly helps the scriptwriter's case... When he sums the whole story up as an early American instance of class warfare."

Michel Contat and Michel Rybalka, who edited and annotated Sartre's writings, wrote that Sartre introduced a strong element of communist class struggle into his adaptation of Miller's play, especially by turning Danforth from merely sanctimonious to a calculated villain who pulls the strings behind the trial, while making the character of Abigail more complex and consequently, almost sympathetic. In the introduction to the 2010 edition of The Crucible, editor Susan C. W. Abbotson described the film's plot as a "conflict between capitalists and heroic Marxists", writing that "Miller felt the Marxist references were too heavy-handed. Most critics agreed." Abbotson also commented that "Sartre changed the play's theme... His version becomes despiritualized... As it desires to present us the heroic representatives of Communism." In another occasion, Miller told that he disliked the film because it "reduced man to a digit in the socialist dialectic."

According to Susan Hayward, the picture's release shortly after the crushing of the 1956 Hungarian Uprising by the Soviets caused several critics to attack it as a work of pro-communists, who resisted Joseph McCarthy and the French War in Algeria but supported the Kremlin. Hayward, however, viewed it as standing in favor of the right to exercise free speech in general.

Arthur Miller wrote: "Mylene Demongeot, was [in The Crucible] truly beautiful and so bursting with real sexuality as to become a generalized force whose effects on the community transcended herself."

== Releases ==
For decades, general exploitation of the film was blocked at Arthur Miller's request, as Miller, who had been granted partial distribution rights, claimed to disapprove of Sartre's adaptation, endorsing instead the 1996 film directed by Nicholas Hytner. However, rumors often mentioned that Miller had a grudge against Yves Montand, because Montand had an affair with Miller's then-wife Marilyn Monroe during production of Let's Make Love (1960). This theory was later confirmed by cast member Mylène Demongeot. French studio Pathé was ultimately able to purchase the stake owned by Arthur Miller's estate in the distribution rights, and a restored version of the film was released on home video in France in 2017.

== See also ==
- List of American films of 1957
- List of films about witchcraft
- Salem witch trials
