= The Crucible (1996 film) =

American historical drama film

- Theatrical release poster
- Directed by: Nicholas Hytner
- Screenplay by: Arthur Miller
- Based on: The Crucible by Arthur Miller
- Produced by: Robert A. Miller; David V. Picker
- Starring: Daniel Day-Lewis; Winona Ryder; Paul Scofield; Joan Allen; Bruce Davison; Rob Campbell; Jeffrey Jones
- Cinematography: Andrew Dunn
- Edited by: Tariq Anwar
- Music by: George Fenton
- Distributed by: 20th Century Fox
- Release date: November 27, 1996 (United States)
- Running time: 126 minutes
- Countries: United Kingdom; United States
- Language: English
- Budget: $25 million
- Box office: $7.3 million

The Crucible is a 1996 American historical drama film directed by Nicholas Hytner and written by Arthur Miller, based on his 1953 play. It stars Daniel Day-Lewis as John Proctor, Winona Ryder as Abigail Williams, Paul Scofield in his final live-action film role as Judge Thomas Danforth, Joan Allen as Elizabeth Proctor, and Bruce Davison as Reverend Samuel Parris. Set in 1692, during the Salem witch trials, the film follows a group of teenage girls who, after getting caught performing a ritual in the woods, band together and falsely accuse several of the townspeople of witchcraft.

Principal photography began in Massachusetts and Nova Scotia on September 11, 1995, and concluded on November 18. The Crucible was theatrically released in the United States by 20th Century Fox on November 27, 1996, and was a commercial failure, grossing only $7.3 million against its $25 million budget. Despite this, it received positive reviews from critics, with Day-Lewis, Ryder, Scofield, and Allen earning widespread acclaim for their performances.

The Crucible was screened at the 47th Berlin International Film Festival, where it competed for the Golden Bear. At the 54th Golden Globe Awards, Scofield and Allen were nominated for Best Supporting Actor and Best Supporting Actress respectively, while Allen received a Best Supporting Actress nomination at the 69th Academy Awards, and Scofield won Best Actor in a Supporting Role at the 50th British Academy Film Awards. Arthur Miller received nominations for the Academy Award for Best Adapted Screenplay and the BAFTA Award for Best Adapted Screenplay.

== Plot ==
In Salem, Massachusetts, in 1692, a group of village girls meet in the woods with slave Tituba, attempting to conjure love spells. Abigail Williams kills a chicken and drinks its blood, wishing for John Proctor's wife Elizabeth to die. When Abigail's uncle, Reverend Samuel Parris, discovers them, the girls run away, but his daughter Betty collapses unconscious.

Betty will not awaken, nor will Thomas and Ann Putnam's daughter Ruth, who was also conjuring. Giles Corey, who suspects that the children are just acting out, and John Proctor, with whom Abigail had an affair, visit the Parris household. Believing Betty and Ruth to be demonically possessed, Parris and the Putnams call Reverend John Hale from nearby Beverly to examine Betty. To save herself and the other girls from punishment, Abigail accuses Tituba of witchcraft. After being whipped, Tituba confesses to seeing the Devil and is saved from being hanged. Struck by their new power, the girls begin naming numerous other women, including Elizabeth, whom they "saw" with the Devil.

John wants to forget about his affair with Abigail and get back with Elizabeth. He decides to stop Abigail's accusations, telling his servant, Mary Warren, who is one of the "afflicted" girls, to testify at the trial that the witchcraft was faked. In court, Francis Nurse gives a list of people vouching for the accused; the judges order that all on the list be arrested and brought in for questioning. Giles insists that when Ruth accused Rebecca Nurse, Mr. Putnam was heard to tell Ruth that she had won him a "fine gift of land". Giles refuses to identify who heard this remark, and the judges order his arrest. Mary Warren insists she only thought she saw spirits but the other girls later cow her into recanting. Elizabeth says she is pregnant and will be spared from death until the baby is born, but John insists that the girls be charged with false witness.

The girls are called in and asked if they were lying about the witchcraft, but they start screaming that Mary Warren is bewitching them. To demonstrate Abigail's complicity, John confesses to his affair with her, claiming that she accused Elizabeth in order to get rid of her so that she could marry him. Abigail denies this, so Elizabeth is called in to verify it. Unaware that John confessed and wanting to save his reputation, she lies. As Reverend Hale tries to persuade the court of John's honesty, the girls turn the court further against the Proctors by screaming that Mary Warren is attacking them as a "yellow bird". John repeats his accusation that the girls are merely pretending, but they run outside from the "bird" into a nearby lake. To save herself from being hanged, Mary Warren accuses John of witchcraft. When asked if he will return to God, John despairingly yells, "I say God is dead!" and is arrested as a witch.

Multiple people are falsely accused and hanged; Giles allows himself to be crushed to death rather than plead guilty or not guilty. On the day before John's execution, Reverend Hale icily confronts Abigail at the now-abandoned homes of the victims whom she testified against. Because Hale was the lone official in the court to doubt her claims, Abigail attempts to convince the court that Hale's wife is also a witch; however, this backfires as the judges doubt her, considering a minister's wife to be pure. The girls become outcasts and Abigail steals Parris's money to flee to Barbados, but not before asking John to come with her, saying that she never wished any of this on him. He refuses, stating bluntly, "It's not on a ship we'll meet again, Abigail, but in Hell."

Parris fears that John's hanging will cause riots directed at him, so he allows Elizabeth to meet with John to convince him to "confess" and save his life. John agrees and writes the confession. The judges insist that he sign the confession and publicly display it to prove his guilt and to convince others to confess, but John, determined to keep his name pure for his sons, angrily shouts, "Leave me my name!" and tears it up. On the gallows, John, Rebecca Nurse, and Martha Corey's recitation of the Lord's Prayer is cut short when they are hanged.

Later, nineteen people are executed after refusing to save themselves by giving false confessions. The Salem Witch Trials are brought to an end after this.

== Cast ==
- Daniel Day-Lewis as John Proctor
- Winona Ryder as Abigail Williams
- Paul Scofield as Judge Thomas Danforth
- Joan Allen as Elizabeth Proctor
- Bruce Davison as Reverend Samuel Parris
- Rob Campbell as Reverend John Hale
- Jeffrey Jones as Thomas Putnam
- Peter Vaughan as Giles Corey
- Karron Graves as Mary Warren
- Charlayne Woodard as Tituba
- Kali Rocha as Mercy Lewis
- Rachael Bella as Betty Parris
- Frances Conroy as Ann Putnam
- Ashley Peldon as Ruth Putnam
- Elizabeth Lawrence as Rebecca Nurse
- Tom McDermott as Francis Nurse
- George Gaynes as Judge Samuel Sewall
- Mary Pat Gleason as Martha Corey
- Robert Breuler as Judge John Hathorne
- Michael Gaston as Marshal George Herrick
- Ruth Maleczech as Goody Osbourne
- William Preston as George Jacobs, Sr.
- John Griesemer as Ezekiel Cheever

== Background ==
In 1952, Miller's friend Elia Kazan appeared before the House Un-American Activities Committee (HUAC); fearful of being blacklisted from Hollywood, Kazan named eight members of the Group Theatre, including Clifford Odets, Paula Strasberg, Lillian Hellman, and John Garfield, who in recent years had been fellow members of the Communist Party. After speaking with Kazan about his testimony, Miller traveled to Salem, Massachusetts to research the witch trials of 1692. The Crucible, in which Miller likened the situation with the House Un-American Activities Committee to the witch hunt in Salem in 1692, opened at the Beck Theatre on Broadway on January 22, 1953.

Miller and Kazan were close friends throughout the late 1940s and early 1950s (the latter had directed the original production of Miller's Death of a Salesman), but after Kazan's testimony to the HUAC, the pair's friendship ended, and they did not speak to each other for the next ten years. The HUAC took an interest in Miller himself not long after The Crucible opened, denying him a passport to attend the play's London opening in 1954. Miller was later further investigated: when testimony came out that he misled the HUAC, he was sentenced to a $500 fine and a 30-day stay in jail; it was overturned on appeal. Kazan defended his own actions through his film On the Waterfront, in which a dockworker heroically testifies against a corrupt union boss.

Though the play was widely considered only somewhat successful at the time of its first production, The Crucible is now one of Miller's most well known and frequently produced works throughout the world. It was adapted as an opera by Robert Ward, which won the Pulitzer Prize for Music in 1962.

=== Historical accuracy ===
The film kept many of the play's documented inaccuracies; various characters' ages were changed, including making Abigail Williams older and John Proctor younger when, in reality, they were approximately 12 and 60 years old, respectively. As in the play, the film fabricates a relationship between the two. Characters and events were also conflated, such as featuring Thomas Danforth presiding over the trials (when he was not documented as having done so in reality) and combining the trials and sentences of John Proctor, Martha Corey, and Rebecca Nurse.

== Reception ==
The movie was not a box office success, making only $7,343,114 in the United States.

=== Critical reception ===
The film has an overall score of 71% on the review aggregation website Rotten Tomatoes, based on 65 critic reviews, with an average rating of 7.3/10. The critics consensus states: "This staid adaptation of The Crucible dutifully renders Arthur Miller's landmark play on the screen with handsome production design and sturdy performances, if not with the political anger and thematic depth that earned the drama its reputation." Victor Navasky of The New York Times wrote that the film was "thought impossible to make during the McCarthy years" due to its allegorical connections to McCarthyism, yet was "probably destined for Hollywood all along".

Owen Gleiberman of Entertainment Weekly gave the film a grade of "A", calling the adaptation "joltingly powerful" and noting the "spectacularly"-acted performances of Day-Lewis, Scofield, and Allen. Roger Ebert gave the film 2 out of 4 stars, writing that the "story has all the right moves and all the correct attitudes, but there is something lacking at its core; I think it needs less frenzy and more human nature". Philip Thomas of Empire gave the film 5 out of 5 stars, calling it an "almost perfect screen adaptation".

=== Awards and nominations ===
Award	Category	Nominee(s)	Results	Ref.
Academy Awards	Best Supporting Actress	Joan Allen	Nominated	
Academy Awards	Best Adapted Screenplay	Arthur Miller	Nominated	
Art Directors Guild Awards	Excellence in Production Design – Feature Film	Lilly Kilvert and John Warnkle	Nominated	
Berlin International Film Festival	Golden Bear	Nicholas Hytner	Nominated	
Boston Society of Film Critics Awards	Best Supporting Actress	Joan Allen	Nominated	
British Academy Film Awards	Best Actor in a Supporting Role	Paul Scofield	Won	
British Academy Film Awards	Best Adapted Screenplay	Arthur Miller	Nominated	
Chicago Film Critics Association Awards	Best Supporting Actress	Joan Allen	Nominated	
Critics' Choice Awards	Best Picture		Nominated	
Critics' Choice Awards	Best Supporting Actress	Joan Allen	Won	
Empire Awards	Best Actress	Joan Allen	Won	
Florida Film Critics Circle Awards	Best Supporting Actress	Joan Allen	Runner-up	
Golden Globe Awards	Best Supporting Actor – Motion Picture	Paul Scofield	Nominated	
Golden Globe Awards	Best Supporting Actress – Motion Picture	Joan Allen	Nominated	
New York Film Critics Circle Awards	Best Actor	Daniel Day-Lewis	Runner-up	
Online Film & Television Association Awards	Best Drama Actress	Winona Ryder	Nominated	
Online Film & Television Association Awards	Best Supporting Actress	Joan Allen	Nominated	
Online Film & Television Association Awards	Best Adapted Screenplay	Arthur Miller	Nominated	
Online Film & Television Association Awards	Best Cinematography	Andrew Dunn	Nominated	
Political Film Society Awards	Human Rights		Nominated	
Satellite Awards	Best Actor in a Supporting Role – Drama	Paul Scofield	Nominated	
Satellite Awards	Best Actress in a Supporting Role – Drama	Joan Allen	Nominated	
Satellite Awards	Best Adapted Screenplay	Arthur Miller	Nominated	
Southeastern Film Critics Association Awards	Best Picture		4th Place	
Southeastern Film Critics Association Awards	Best Supporting Actor	Paul Scofield	Runner-up	
Southeastern Film Critics Association Awards	Best Supporting Actress	Joan Allen	Won (Note: Tied with Piper Laurie for The Grass Harp.)	

The film is recognized by American Film Institute in these lists:

- 2008: AFI's 10 Top 10:
  - Nominated: Courtroom Drama Film

== See also ==
- List of films about witchcraft
