= Mary Warren (Salem witch trials) =

Accuser and confessed witch (c. 1674–1710)

- Born: c. 1674; Salem, Massachusetts, England
- Died: c. 1710 possibly Waltham, Massachusetts
- Occupation: Maidservant
- Known for: Accuser and accused in the Salem witch trials

Mary Ann Warren (c. 1674 — c. 1710) was an accuser and later confessed witch during the 1692 Salem witch trials. She was a servant for John and Elizabeth Proctor. Renouncing her claims after threats of beating from her master, she was later accused and arrested for allegedly practicing witchcraft herself, after which she again became afflicted and accused others of witchcraft. Her life after the trials is unknown.

== Salem Witch Trials ==
In early March 1692, Warren began having fits, claiming that she saw the ghost of Giles Corey. John Proctor told her she was just seeing his shadow, and put her to work at the spinning wheel, threatening to beat her if she pretended to have any more fits. For some time, she did not report any more sightings, but she started to have fits again.

Warren was kept hard at work at the Proctor home and was told that if she ran into fire or water during one of her fits, she would not be rescued. When her seizures did stop, she posted a note at the Meeting House one Sabbath eve to request prayers of thanks. That night, Warren stated that John Proctor woke her to torment her about posting the note. On April 3, 1692, Samuel Parris read Mary's note to the church members, who began to question Warren after the Sunday services. Some took her answers to their questions to mean that the girls had lied. Warren told them she felt better now and could tell the difference between reality and visions. The other girls became angry with Mary and began accusing her of being a witch because she had told the high court that all the girls were lying that they saw the devil. She was formally accused of witchcraft on April 18, 1692. Under questioning she continued to have fits, confessing under duress to witchcraft and began to accuse various people, including the Proctors, of witchcraft.

Having confessed to witchcraft herself, she was eventually released from prison in June 1692. It is not known what happened to Warren after the trials ended, though John Hale's book "A Modest Inquiry Into the Nature of Witchcraft" (written in 1697 and published in 1702) mentions an afflicted girl who suffered from "diabolical manifestation" until her death and died a single woman. Since all but three of the accusers had married or were alive by the book's publication, it is possible he was talking about Warren.

== The Crucible ==
Mary Warren is a character in the play The Crucible by Arthur Miller. True to the historical record, she is a maid for John Proctor, and becomes involved in the Salem witch hunt as one of the accusers, led by Abigail Williams. Mary Warren has a very weak character, giving in to pressure a number of times. Proctor manages to convince her to reveal that she and the other accusers have been fabricating their stories and "supernatural experiences" that have resulted in the arrest of many innocents. However, Warren's confession comes to nothing. Williams accuses Warren of witchcraft, which leads Warren to renounce her confession and accuse Proctor of forcing her to make it. Proctor is later hanged as he renounces his confession to save his heart and soul. In the 1957 and 1996 film adaptations of Miller's play, she was depicted by Pascale Petit and Karron Graves, respectively.
