= John Hale (minister) =

American Puritan minister

The Reverend John Hale
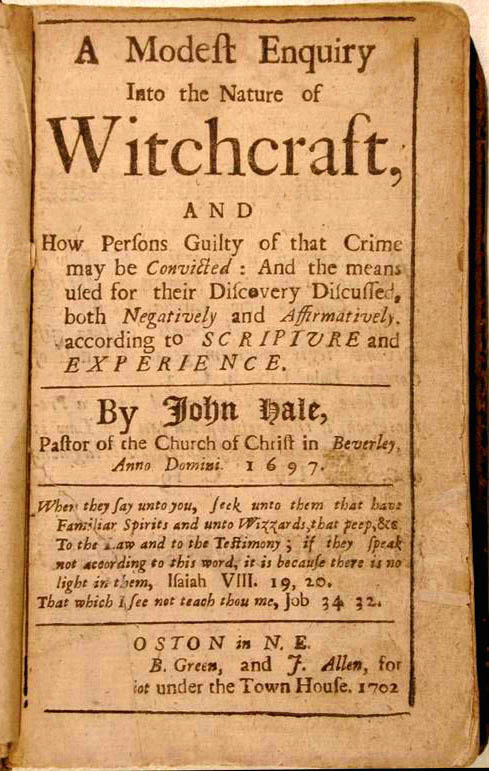
- Title page of A Modest Enquiry Into the Nature of Witchcraft by John Hale (Boston, 1702)
- Born: John Hale; June 3, 1636; Charlestown, Massachusetts Bay Colony
- Died: May 15, 1700 (aged 63); Salem, Province of Massachusetts Bay
- Education: Harvard College
- Occupation: Pastor
- Known for: Minister associated with the Salem witch trials
- Spouses: Rebecca Byles (m. 1664; died 1683) Sarah Noyes (m. 1656–1697)

John Hale (June 3, 1636 – May 15, 1700) was the Puritan pastor of Beverly, Massachusetts, and took part in the Salem witch trials in 1692. He was one of the most prominent and influential ministers associated with the witch trials, being noted as having initially supported the trials and then changing his mind and publishing a critique of them.

His book, A Modest Enquiry Into the Nature of Witchcraft was published posthumously, two years after his death. The book provides an alternative Christian theory for what actually happened in Salem in 1692, with Hale theorizing that demons impersonated the accused and appeared in their forms to the afflicted. It's a common misconception that he changed his views on the subject of witchcraft after his wife was accused. However, he was already showing signs of his different views in testimony he gave and other records from the trials.

== Biography ==
John Hale was born on June 3, 1636, in Charlestown, Massachusetts Bay Colony. The oldest child of Robert Hale, a blacksmith, he was educated at Harvard College in Cambridge, graduating in 1657. He began preaching in Bass-river-side, later called Beverly, about 1664, and was ordained as the first minister of the parish church there on September 20, 1667, when the congregation formally separated from Salem. He married his first wife, Rebecca Byly, on December 15, 1664, and she died April 13, 1683, at the age of 45.

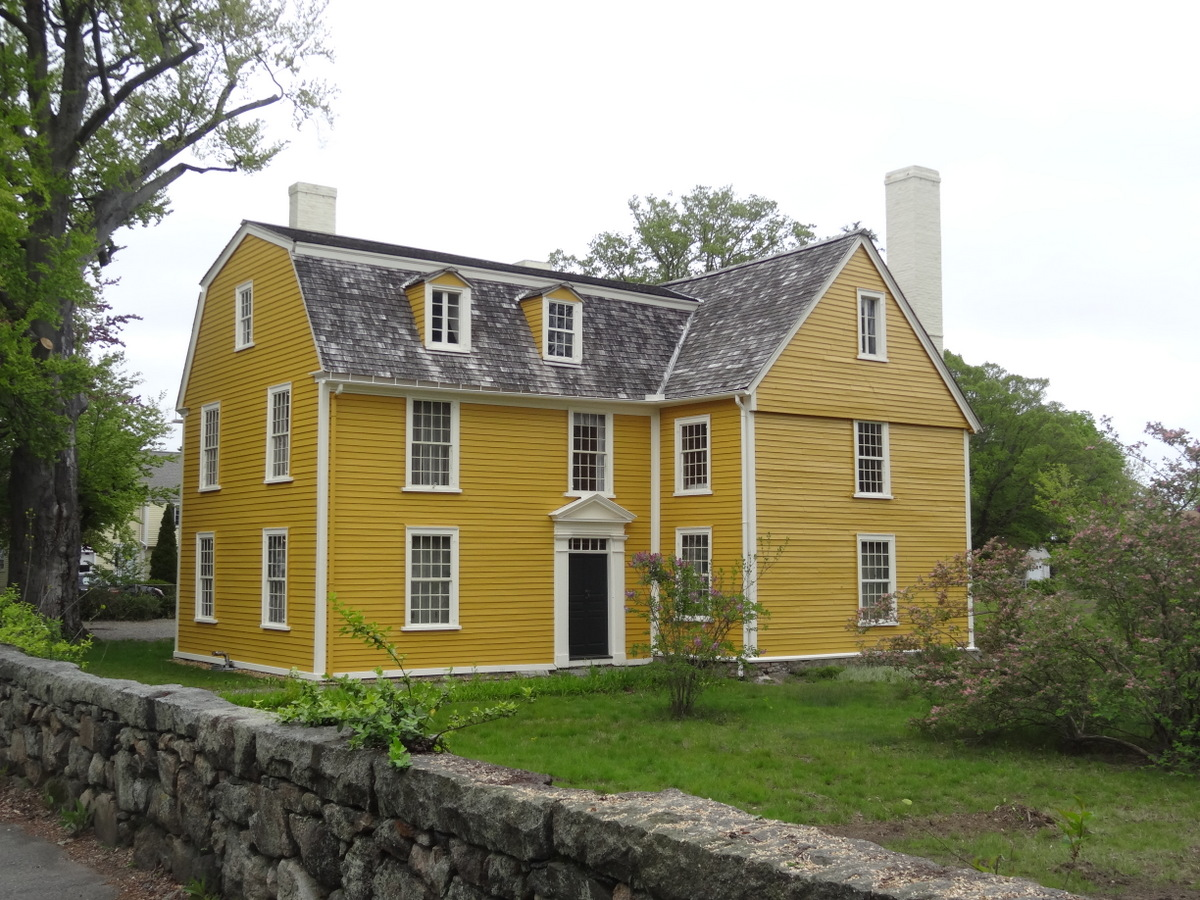
Rev. John Hale Farm

As a child, Hale had witnessed the execution of Margaret Jones, one of the first of 15 people to be executed for witchcraft in New England and the first to be executed in Massachusetts, between 1647 and 1663. He was present at the examinations and trials of various people who were accused of witchcraft in the Salem witch trials of 1692, and supported the work of the court. However, on November 14, 1692, 17-year-old Mary Herrick accused his second wife, Sarah Noyes Hale, and the ghost of executed Mary Eastey of afflicting her, but his wife was never formally charged or arrested. A later commentator on the trials, Charles Upham, suggests that this accusation was one that helped turn public opinion to end the prosecutions, and spurred Hale's willingness to reconsider his support of the trials.

After the trials, Sarah died and Hale began writing his book "A Modest Inquiry into the Nature of Witchcraft", in which he suggested the fear of witchcraft was so great that it impaired the judgment of everyone involved in the trials, possibly resulting in the death of innocent people. Hale died at the age of 63 in 1700, and the book was published two years later.

Hale's great-grandson, Nathan Hale, was a soldier in the American Revolution whose execution and final words would become celebrated through American history.

== Adaptation in 'The Crucible' ==
In Arthur Miller's 1953 play The Crucible, a fictional portrayal of Hale appears in Act I in a request from Samuel Parris that he examine his daughter, Betty Parris. Hale's quick visit to examine Betty causes him to become one of the main characters in the play.

Hale is depicted as a young minister who has devoted most of his life to the study of witchcraft and other demonic arts in the hope of being able to destroy them in the name of God. He has found a 'witch' in his home town of Beverly, Massachusetts, where he preaches. Hale is the minister in charge of discovering who has the "marks of the Devil" for the witch trials. As a devout Christian, Hale sees it as his duty to seek out the witches, and to 'save their souls'. After seeing the horrors of the witch trials and watching the loss of both civil and human rights, Hale has a conversion of heart and speaks out against them, telling Judge Danforth that they are morally wrong. Hale leaves the court when Mary Warren accuses John Proctor of witchcraft, famously declaring, "I denounce these proceedings. I quit this court!" to which Danforth replies, running after him, "Mr. Hale, Mr. Hale!"

=== Screen Adaptations of 'The Crucible' ===
In the 1957 screen adaptation of Miller's piece, Hale was depicted by Yves Brainville. In the 1996 film version of the play, he was portrayed by Rob Campbell, as a much younger man than would have been historically accurate, the real Hale being fifty-six at the time of the trials. However, Arthur Miller's play is itself not entirely historically accurate, particularly in pertaining to ages of the characters; Abigail Williams would have been closer to 12 than 17, for instance, John Proctor would have been near 60.

In the movie, Hale's wife is accused by Abigail Williams once she begins to suspect him of doubting her claims. This is quickly dismissed by Danforth, leading to Abigail escaping from the village. He later witnesses the hanging of Rebecca Nurse, Martha Corey and John Proctor.

John Hale is played by Xander Berkeley (as Magistrate Hale) in the 2014 TV series Salem.
