= Dorothy Good =

Child accused of witchcraft in the Salem witch trials

- Born: c. 1687 or 1688
- Died: after 1738
- Other name: Dorcas Good or Dorothy Good
- Known for: Youngest accused of witchcraft in the Salem witch trials
- Parents: William Good (father); Sarah Good (mother)
- Relatives: Mercy Good (1692–1692; sister)

Dorothy Good (historically referred to as Dorcas Good; born c. 1687/1688) was the daughter of William Good and Sarah Good (née Solart).

== Witchcraft Accusation ==
Dorothy and her mother Sarah were accused of practicing witchcraft in Salem at the beginning of the Salem witch trials in 1692. Only four years old at the time, she was interrogated by the local magistrates, confessed to being a witch and purportedly claimed she had seen her mother consorting with the devil. Mary Walcott and Ann Putnam Jr. claimed the child was deranged and repeatedly bit them as if she were an animal.

Dorothy, written as "Dorcas" on the warrant for her arrest, received a brief hearing in which the accusers repeatedly complained of bites on their arms. She was sent to jail, becoming at age five the youngest person to be jailed during the Salem witch trials. Two days later, she was visited by Salem officials. She claimed she owned a snake given to her by her mother that talked to her and sucked blood from her finger. The officials took this to mean it was her "familiar", which is defined as a witch's spiritual servant in animal form.

== Release ==
Dorothy was in custody from March 24, 1692, when she was arrested until she was released on bond for £50 on December 10, 1692. She was never indicted or tried. Her examinations by the magistrates were conducted on March 24, 25, and 26th, according to Rev. Deodat Lawson:

The Magistrates and Ministers also did inform me, that they apprehended a child of Sarah G. and Examined it, being between 4 and 5 years of Age And as to matter of Fact, they did Unanimously affirm, that when this Child, did but cast its eye upon the afflicted persons, they were tormented, and they held her Head, and yet so many as her eye could fix upon were afflicted. Which they did several times make careful observation of the afflicted complained, they had often been Bitten by this child and produced the marks of a small set of teeth, accordingly, this was also committed to Salem Prison; the child looked hail, and well as other Children. I saw it at Lievt. Ingersols After the commitment of Goode. N. Tho: Putmans wife was much better, and had no violent fits at all from that 24th of March to the 5th of April. Some others also said they had not seen her so frequently appear to them, to hurt them. ... On the 26th of March, Mr. Hathorne, Mr. Corwin, and Mr. Higison were at the Prison-Keepers house to examine the Child. The child told them there, it had a little Snake that used to Suck on the lowest Joint of her Fore-Finger. When they inquired where, pointing to other places, The child told them, not there, but there, pointing on the Lowest point of the Fore-Finger; where they observed a deep Red Spot, about the Bigness of a Flea-bite.

== Aftermath ==
While in jail, she watched her mother give birth, her newborn sister dying and then seeing her mother being led away to her death. By the time she was finally released at five years of age, Dorothy was severely psychologically disturbed.

Benjamin Putnam took Dorothy into his home from 1708 to 1715. In late 1720, she was transient and gave birth to a child out of wedlock named Dorothy Good. At this time she was in the care of Nathaniel and Hannah Putnam. In 1722, Dorothy Good junior was indentured to Nathaniel Putnam as a household servant and Dorothy senior was to be moved to Robert Hutchinson's home. Robert was Nathaniel's brother in law, via his sister Elizabeth. However, Dorothy ended up in the house of corrections (workhouse) in Salem in 1722 for 18 weeks. In 1725, she again went to the house of corrections. Robert paid for her release, and she was pregnant with another child, either conceived before or during her imprisonment. She gave birth to William Good in June 1725 in Concord, Massachusetts. Nathaniel Billing of Concord took her in. She returned to Salem and moved from house to house, including Nathaniel Putnam and Jonathan Batchelder. Jonathan Batchelder had given testimony against Dorothy's mother Sarah Good in 1692 when he was 14. William was indentured to Jonathan Batchelder. Dorothy lived here until 1738, when she disappeared from the records. On August 14, 1761, a woman named Dorothy Good was found dead in a bog meadow outside of New London, Connecticut. It is unknown if this is either Dorothy Good of Salem, but Dorothy senior would have been 73 and she was a wandering transient, so it may be.

== Mercy Good ==
Dorothy had a younger sister, Mercy, who was born after Sarah Good's arrest and died shortly after birth, likely from malnourishment and the harsh conditions of imprisonment.

== "Dorothy" v. "Dorcas" ==
Good's first name was incorrectly written as "Dorcas" by Magistrate John Hathorne on the warrant for her arrest dated March 23, 1692, but was correctly called "Dorothy" everywhere else in the legal records. Deodat Lawson's accounts of her examinations never mention her first name, but later writers, such as Charles W. Upham in his influential book Salem Witchcraft (1867), repeated the initial error from the arrest warrant and she has subsequently come to be referred to by the wrong name.

== Fictional portrayals ==
- Earhart, Rose. Dorcas Good: The Diary of a Salem Witch. Pendleton Books, New York, 2000; ISBN 1-893221-02-4
- Kent, Kathleen. "The Heretic's Daughter". Little, Brown and Company, New York, 2008; ISBN 978-0-316-02448-8
- Rinaldi, Ann. A Break with Charity. Simon and Schuster Books, New York, 1992; ISBN 0-15-204682-8
- P. C. Cast, Kristin Cast.Spells Trouble: Sisters of Salem (Volume 1 of Sisters of Salem).St. Martin's Publishing Group, 2021; ISBN 1250765641, ISBN 978-1-250-76564-2
