= The Crucible =

1953 play by Arthur Miller

- Original language: English
- Written by: Arthur Miller
- Characters: Abigail Williams; Reverend John Hale; Reverend Samuel Parris; John Proctor; Elizabeth Proctor; Thomas Danforth; Mary Warren; John Hathorne; Giles Corey; Rebecca Nurse
- Subject: Salem witch trials, McCarthyism
- Genre: Tragedy
- Setting: Salem, Massachusetts

Premiere
- Date: January 22, 1953; 73 years ago
- Place: Martin Beck Theatre, New York City

The Crucible is a 1953 play by the American playwright Arthur Miller. It is a dramatized and partially fictionalized story of the Salem witch trials that took place in the Province of Massachusetts Bay from 1692 to 1693. Miller wrote the play as an allegory for McCarthyism, when the United States government persecuted people accused of being communists. Miller was later questioned by the House of Representatives' Committee on Un-American Activities in 1956 and convicted of contempt of Congress for refusing to identify others present at meetings he had attended.

The play was first performed at the Martin Beck Theatre on Broadway on January 22, 1953, starring E. G. Marshall, Beatrice Straight and Madeleine Sherwood. Miller felt that this production was too stylized and cold, and the reviews for it were largely hostile (although The New York Times noted "a powerful play [in a] driving performance"). The production won the 1953 Tony Award for Best Play. A year later, a new production succeeded and the play became a classic. It is regarded as a central work in the canon of American drama.

== Plot ==
=== Act One ===
In Salem, Province of Massachusetts Bay, Puritan colonists lead an isolated theocracy in constant conflict with Native Americans. The story begins with Betty Parris lying motionless in an attic. The previous evening, her father Samuel Parris witnessed her, some other girls, and his slave Tituba dancing in the forest while naked. The village becomes rife with rumors of witchcraft. Parris is concerned that the event will cause him to be removed from his position as the town's preacher. He questions his niece and adopted daughter Abigail Williams (Note: Abigail's parents are depicted as having died in King Philip's War.). Abigail denies that her and the girls were engaged in witchcraft. Afterwards, Thomas Putnam and his wife Ann arrive. At the Putnams' urging, Parris reluctantly reveals that he has invited John Hale to investigate. Betty attempts to jump out of the window, and Abigail coerces the others to "stick to their story" of merely dancing in the woods. They comply out of fear of being labelled witches, despite trying to conjure a curse against Elizabeth Proctor that night. Betty then passes out.

John Proctor, Elizabeth's husband, arrives and sends the other girls out and confronts Abigail, who denies allegations of witchcraft. It is revealed that Abigail once worked as a servant for the Proctors, and that she and John had an affair, for which she was fired. Abigail still harbors feelings for John and believes they are reciprocated, but John denies this. Abigail angrily mocks John for denying his true feelings for her. Meanwhile, Betty bolts upright and begins screaming. Parris runs back into the bedroom and various villagers arrive. Abigail, standing quietly in a corner, witnesses them bickering over witchcraft, Betty's health, and Parris' pay as minister.

John Hale arrives and questions Parris, Abigail and Tituba over the girls' activities in the woods. Abigail claims Tituba forced her to drink blood; Tituba instead states that Abigail begged her to conjure a deadly curse. Parris threatens to whip Tituba to death if she does not confess to witchcraft. Tituba breaks down and falsely claims that the Devil is bewitching her and others in town and accuses Sarah Osborne and Sarah Good of witchcraft. Mrs. Putnam identifies Osborne as her former midwife and asserts that she must have killed her children. Abigail decides to play along with Tituba in order to prevent others from discovering her affair with Proctor. She leaps up, begins contorting wildly, and names Osborne, Good, and Bridget Bishop as having been "dancing with the devil". Betty suddenly rises and begins mimicking Abigail's movements and words, and accuses George Jacobs. The three continue with their accusations as Hale orders the arrest of the named people and sends for judges to try them.

=== Act Two ===
John and Elizabeth are incredulous that nearly forty people have been arrested for witchcraft. John knows that these allegations are untrue, as Abigail told him such, but is unsure of how to confess without revealing their affair. Elizabeth is disconcerted to learn her husband was alone with Abigail, who she believes still lusts after him. Mary Warren, the Proctors' servant, arrives at the Proctors' home and gives Elizabeth a poppet that she made while serving as a court witness. She reveals that 39 of the accused have been arrested so far, and might be hanged. She also reveals that Goody Osborne will be hanged, but Sarah Good's life is safe, as she confessed that she made a compact with Lucifer to torment Christians. Angered that Mary is neglecting her duties, John threatens to beat her. Mary retorts that she is now an official in the court, and that she must appear there on a daily basis. It is revealed that Elizabeth was to be arrested until Mary spoke in her defense. Mary refuses to identify Elizabeth's accuser, but Elizabeth surmises accurately that it was Abigail. She implores John to tell the court that the witchcraft allegations are false. John is reluctant, fearing that doing so will require him to reveal his affair.

Hale arrives at the Proctors' home, stating that he is interviewing all of the accused. He mentions that Rebecca Nurse was also named, but admits that he doubts this due to her extreme piousness, though he emphasizes that anything is possible. Hale is skeptical about the Proctors' religiousness, noting that they do not attend church regularly and that one of their three sons has not been baptized; John replies that this is due to his disdain for Parris. Challenged to recite the Ten Commandments, John forgets "thou shalt not commit adultery". When Hale questions her, Elizabeth is angered that he did not question Abigail first. At Elizabeth's urging, John tells Hale he knows that the accusations are fake. When Hale responds that many of the accused have confessed, John points out that they were to be hanged if they did not; Hale reluctantly acknowledges this. Giles Corey and Francis Nurse enter the house and inform John and Hale that both of their wives have been arrested for witchcraft, on account of reading "suspicious" books and sacrificing children, respectively.

A posse led by clerk Ezekiel Cheever and town marshal George Herrick arrive soon afterwards and present a warrant for Elizabeth's arrest, much to Hale's surprise. He informs John that Abigail had a pain-induced fit earlier that evening and a needle was found stuck in her stomach; Abigail claimed that Elizabeth stabbed her with the poppet's needle through witchcraft. Mary asserts that she made the doll and stuck the needle into it, and that Abigail saw her do so. Cheever is unconvinced and prepares to arrest Elizabeth. John angrily tears the warrant to shreds and threatens Herrick and Cheever until Elizabeth calms him down and surrenders herself. He calls Hale a coward and asks him why the accusers remain unchallenged. Hale suggests that misfortune has befallen Salem because of an unmasked crime. John then orders Mary to go to court with him and expose the other girls' lies, but she protests. Aware of John's affair, she warns him that Abigail is willing to expose it if necessary. John is shocked but determines that the truth must prevail.

=== Act Three ===
37 days later, Martha Corey is on trial in court. Francis and Giles desperately interrupt the proceedings, demanding to be heard. The men are thrown out of the main room. John Proctor arrives with Mary Warren and they inform Deputy Governor Danforth and Judge Hathorne about the girls' lies. Danforth then informs an unaware John that Elizabeth is pregnant, and promises to spare her from execution until the child is born, hoping to persuade John to withdraw his case. John refuses to back down and submits a deposition signed by 91 locals attesting to the good character of Elizabeth, Rebecca Nurse and Martha Corey; Herrick also attests to John's truthfulness as well. The deposition is dismissed by Parris and Hathorne as illegal. Hale criticizes the decision and demands to know why the accused canot defend themselves. Danforth replies that the word of the accused cannot be trusted given the "invisible nature" of witchcraft.

Danforth then orders that all 91 locals named in the deposition be arrested for questioning. Giles Corey submits his own deposition, accusing Thomas Putnam of forcing his daughter to accuse George Jacobs in order to buy up his land (Note: In the story, convicted witches have to forfeit all of their property.). When asked by Hathorne to reveal the source of his information, Giles refuses, fearing that they will also be arrested. When Danforth threatens him with arrest for contempt, Giles argues that he cannot be arrested for "contempt of a hearing." Danforth then declares the court in session and Giles is arrested. John submits Mary's deposition, which declares that she was coerced to accuse people by Abigail. Abigail denies Mary's assertions that they are pretending, and stands by her story about the poppet. When told by Parris and Hathorne to "pretend to be possessed", Mary is too afraid to comply. John reveals that Abigail and the other girls were caught dancing naked in the woods by Parris on the night of Betty Parris' alleged "bewitchment". When Danforth begins to question Abigail, she claims that Mary has begun to bewitch her with a cold wind and John loses his temper. He confesses their affair, Abigail's resulting firing, and Abigail's attempts to murder Elizabeth.

Danforth brings Elizabeth in to confirm this story. Unaware of John's public confession, Elizabeth lies and states that there was no affair, and that she fired Abigail out of wild suspicion. Hale begs Danforth to reconsider his judgement, but Danforth throws out this testimony based solely upon John's earlier assertion that Elizabeth would never tell a lie. Abigail and the girls run about screaming, claiming that Mary's spirit is attacking them. When Danforth announces Mary's death sentence, she recants her allegations against them, claiming that John Proctor forced her to turn against the others and that he harbors the devil. John, having given up all hope, declares that "God is dead", and is arrested. Furious, Hale denounces the proceedings and leaves the court.

=== Act Four ===
Three months later in the town jail, Tituba, sharing a cell with Sarah Good, starts hearing voices and claims that she can talk to Satan. Herrick, depressed at having arrested so many of his neighbors, has turned to alcoholism. Many villagers have been charged with witchcraft; while most have been imprisoned due to a confession, 12 have been executed. 7 more are to be hanged at sunrise for refusing to confess including John Proctor, Rebecca Nurse and Martha Corey. Giles Corey was pressed to death as the court attempted to extract a plea; though by holding out, Giles ensured that his sons would inherit his property. The village has become dysfunctional, and news of rebellion against the courts in nearby Andover arrives. Abigail, fearful of the consequences, steals Parris's life savings and boards a ship to England with Mercy Lewis. Danforth and Hathorne have returned to Salem to meet with Parris, and are surprised to learn that Hale is meeting with the condemned. Parris, who has lost everything to Abigail, reports that he has received death threats. He begs Danforth to postpone the executions in order to secure confessions. Hale, deeply remorseful and blaming himself, has returned to ask the accused to falsely confess and avoid execution. He presses Danforth to pardon the remaining seven and put the entire affair behind them. Danforth refuses, stating that pardons or postponement would cast doubt on the veracity of previous confessions and hangings.

Danforth and Hale summon Elizabeth and ask her to persuade John to confess. She is bitter towards Hale, both for doubting her earlier and for wanting John to ruin his good name, but agrees to speak with her husband. She and John have a lengthy discussion, during which she commends him for holding out and not confessing. John says he is refusing to confess not out of religious conviction but through contempt for his accusers and the court. The two finally reconcile, with Elizabeth forgiving John. A conflicted John agrees to falsely confess to engaging in witchcraft.

Danforth, Hathorne, and Parris ask John to testify to the guilt of the remainder of the accused, to which John refuses. Danforth is disappointed by this reluctance, but at the urging of Hale and Parris, allows John to sign a written confession. John is wary, thinking his verbal confession is sufficient. As they press him further, John eventually signs, but refuses to hand the paper over, stating he does not want his family to be stigmatized by the public confession. The men argue until Proctor renounces his confession entirely, ripping up the signed document. Danforth calls for the sheriff and John is led away, to be hanged. Facing an imminent rebellion, Putnam and Parris frantically run out to beg Proctor to confess. Hale, guilty over John's death, pleads with Elizabeth to convince John but she refuses, stating John has "found his goodness".

== Characters (in order of appearance) ==
Reverend Samuel Parris
The minister of Salem. A former merchant, Parris is obsessed with his reputation and frequently complains that the village does not pay him enough, earning him a great deal of scorn. When the trials begin, he is appointed as a prosecutor and helps convict the majority of those accused of witchcraft. Towards the end of the play, he is betrayed by his niece Abigail and begins receiving death threats from angry relatives of the condemned. (In real life, Parris left Salem in 1696, the year his wife, Elizabeth, died. He found his situation untenable. Records from Suffolk County, Massachusetts indicate it likely he returned to business in Boston in 1697. He preached two or three years at Stow, Massachusetts before moving to Concord, Massachusetts in 1704 or 1705. He also preached for six months in Dunstable, Massachusetts in 1711, dying on February 27, 1720, in Sudbury, Massachusetts, where he had spent his final years. In 1699 he had remarried to Dorothy Noyes in Sudbury.)
Tituba
The Parris family slave, Tituba was brought by Parris from Barbados when he moved to Salem and has served him since. Using her knowledge of herbs and magic, she has been secretly helping Abigail and her friends make love potions, and even conducts a seance on behalf of Ann Putnam. After being framed for witchcraft, she confesses and is subsequently imprisoned with Sarah Good. By the fourth act, she has been driven mad by the harsh conditions and her ending is unknown. (In reality, she was released without charge after a year of imprisonment; additionally, she is thought to have been of Native American ancestry (possibly from modern Venezuela), not of African ancestry.)
Abigail Williams
The main antagonist of the play. Abigail previously worked as a maid for Elizabeth Proctor. After Elizabeth suspected Abigail of having an illicit relationship with John Proctor, Williams was fired and disgraced. Using her status as Parris's niece to her advantage, she accuses countless citizens of witchcraft, becoming one of the most powerful people in Salem. Eventually, she flees Salem with her uncle's fortune rather than face the consequences of her actions.
Susanna Walcott
A servant girl and part of Abigail's inner circle.
Ann Putnam
A rich and well-connected member of Salem's elite. She has one daughter, Ruth (in real life, Ann Putnam Jr.), but has lost seven other children to illness. Believing witches to be responsible, she eagerly sides with Abigail. (In real life, Ann Putnam (née Carr) had twelve children, ten of whom survived their parents, who both died in 1699).
Thomas Putnam
One of the richest men in Salem. He is greedy and conniving, using the accusations as cover to purchase land seized from convicted witches.
Betty Parris
The ten-year-old daughter of Samuel Parris and one of the primary accusers.
Mercy Lewis
Another primary accuser. In the fourth act, she flees with Abigail to avoid arrest for deceiving the court.
Mary Warren
The Proctor family's servant. She initially helps John, but later turns on him to save herself.
John Proctor
The play's protagonist and husband of Elizabeth Proctor. A local farmer, John is known for his independence and temper, which often gets him into trouble with the authorities. Contemporary notes describe him as a "strong-willed beast of a man". Shamed by an affair with Abigail, John tries to stay out of the trials, but when Elizabeth is charged, he tries to reveal Abigail's deception in court. Betrayed by his maid Mary Warren, John is accused of witchcraft and sentenced to hang. He refuses to confess out of refusal to offer false confession, but ultimately relents in order to spare his life. After learning that it would be displayed publicly, he fully withdraws his confession. He is finally hanged along with several other convicted witches.
(The real John Proctor was also an innkeeper as well as a farmer, and was aged 60 when executed; Elizabeth was his third wife. He was strongly and vocally opposed to the witch trials from their beginning, being particularly scornful of spectral evidence used in the trials. As in the play, Elizabeth was accused of practicing witchcraft and arrested before John. Unlike the play, John maintained his innocence throughout the ordeal. He was hanged in August, 1692.)
Giles Corey
A close friend of Proctor's. He becomes convinced that the trials are being used to steal land from the guilty and presents evidence to prove his claim. When the court demands to know where he obtained it, he refuses to cooperate and is sentenced to be pressed to death. (The character is based on a real person of the same name, who was also pressed when he would not plead guilty to charges of witchcraft.)
Rebecca Nurse
Although an elderly, respected member of the community, she is sentenced to death on charges of witchcraft (and, in the play, infanticide). (In real life, the jury initially acquitted Nurse but were ordered by William Stoughton to deliberate further. One of her two sisters, Mary Easty (or Eastey), was also hanged for witchcraft in real life, and the other, Sarah Cloyce, narrowly escaped.)
Reverend John Hale
A young minister from Beverly, Massachusetts, known for his knowledge of witchcraft. He starts out as a fervent and devoted servant of the court, using his position to investigate and charge suspected witches. Disillusioned with the corruption and abuses of the trials, he later tries to save as many suspects as possible by getting them to confess. (In reality, Hale was in his mid-fifties when the witch trials commenced.)
Elizabeth Proctor
John's wife. She is also accused of witchcraft, but is spared the death penalty due to being pregnant. She distrusts her husband for his adultery, but eventually chooses to forgive him when he refuses to confess to false charges.
Ezekiel Cheever
The clerk of Salem's General Court. He is responsible for crafting the warrants used to arrest suspected witches.
George Herrick/John Willard
Herrick is the town marshal of Salem, and leads the effort to find and arrest those accused of witchcraft until he falls into despair and turns to alcoholism. Willard is one of his deputies until he refuses to carry out any more arrests, at which point he is charged with witchcraft and hanged.
John Hathorne
One of the two judges presiding over the court. Hathorne is a deeply pious man whose blind faith in Abigail's trustworthiness is largely responsible for the destruction wrought by the trials.
Thomas Danforth
The chief judge of the court. He views the proceedings as an opportunity to cement his power and influence, eagerly convicting anyone brought before him. His refusal to suspend the trials even as they tear Salem apart makes him, according to Miller, the true villain of the play.

== Notable casts ==
Character	Broadway debut (1953)	Broadway revival (2002)	2nd Broadway revival (2016)
John Proctor	Arthur Kennedy	Liam Neeson	Ben Whishaw
Abigail Williams	Madeline Sherwood	Angela Bettis	Saoirse Ronan
Governor Thomas Danforth	Walter Hampden	Brian Murray	Ciarán Hinds
Elizabeth Proctor	Beatrice Straight	Laura Linney	Sophie Okonedo
Reverend Samuel Parris	Fred Stewart	Christopher Evan Welch	Jason Butler Harner
Reverend John Hale	E. G. Marshall	John Benjamin Hickey	Bill Camp
Thomas Putnam	Raymond Bramley	Paul O'Brien	Thomas Jay Ryan
Giles Corey	Joseph Sweeney	Tom Aldredge	Jim Norton
Mary Warren	Jennie Egan	Jennifer Carpenter	Tavi Gevinson
Tituba	Jacqueline Andre	Patrice Johnson	Jenny Jules
Susanna Walcott	Barbara Stanton	Kristen Bell	Ashlei Sharpe Chestnut
Mercy Lewis	Dorothy Joliffe	Sevrin Anne Mason	Erin Wilhelmi
Betty Parris	Boo Alexander	Betsy Hogg	Elizabeth Teeter
Ann Putnam	Jane Hoffman	Jeanna Paulsen	Tina Benko
Rebecca Nurse	Jean Adair	Helen Stenborg	Brenda Wehle
Francis Nurse	Graham Velsey	Frank Raiter	Ray Anthony Thomas
Judge Hathorne	Philip Coolidge	J.R. Horne	Teagle F. Bougere
Ezekiel Cheever	Don McHenry	Henry Stram	Michael Braun
Marshall Herrick	George Mitchell	Jack Willis	—N/a
Sarah Good	Adele Fortin	Dale Soules	Tina Benko
Hopkins	Donald Marye	Stephen Lee Anderson	—N/a

- Original 1953 Broadway cast: The production was directed by Jed Harris and produced by Kermit Bloomgarden.
  In June 1953, Miller recast the production, simplified the "pitiless sets of rude buildings" and added a scene.
- 2002 Broadway revival cast: This production was directed by Richard Eyre.
- 2016 Broadway revival cast: This production was directed by Ivo van Hove and featured an original score composed by Philip Glass.

== Originality ==
During the McCarthy era, German-Jewish novelist and playwright Lion Feuchtwanger became the target of suspicion as a left-wing intellectual during his exile in the US. In 1947, Feuchtwanger wrote a play about the Salem witch trials, Wahn oder der Teufel in Boston (Delusion, or The Devil in Boston), as an allegory for the persecution of communists, thus anticipating the theme of The Crucible by Arthur Miller; Wahn premiered in Germany in 1949. It was translated by June Barrows Mussey and performed in Los Angeles in 1953 under the title The Devil in Boston.^{p.374 (note 6)}

== Historical accuracy ==
In 1953, the year the play debuted, Miller wrote of visiting Salem in a New York Times article "Journey to The Crucible", and said: "The Crucible is taken from history. No character is in the play who did not take a similar role in Salem, 1692." Miller made a number of changes to historical events, which were likely intended to simplify the timeline, to reduce the number of characters and to better fit his narrative. Abigail Williams' age was increased from 11 or 12 to 17, probably to add credence to the backstory of Proctor's affair with Abigail. John Proctor himself was 60 years old in 1692, but portrayed as much younger in the play, for the same reason.

In A Note on the Historical Accuracy of this Play, Miller said that "while there were several judges of almost equal authority, I have symbolized them all in Hathorne and Danforth". He combined Danforth with the influential figure of William Stoughton, who is not a character and is only briefly mentioned in the play. Both men were subsequent Deputy Governors, but it was Stoughton (who, alone among the judges, was a bachelor who never married) who ordered further deliberations after the jury initially acquitted Rebecca Nurse. He refused to ever acknowledge that the trials had been anything other than a success, and was infuriated when Governor Phips (whose own wife, somehow, had been named as a possible witch) ended the trials for good and released the prisoners.

Danforth did not sit on the Court of Oyer and Terminer. He is recorded as being critical of the conduct of the trials, and played a role in bringing them to an end. In the play, Thomas and especially Ann Putnam are disconsolate over the fact that only one of their children has survived to adolescence. In real life, the Putnams (who both died in 1699) were survived by ten of their twelve children, including Ann Jr. Thomas Putnam's conduct during the witch trial hysteria has been documented to have been almost entirely due to financial motivations and score-settling, which the play only makes reference to after introducing the Putnams' fictional deceased offspring as part of the plot narrative.

Many of Miller's characters were based on people who had little in the public record other than their statements from the trials, but others survived to expand, recant, or comment on the role they played at Salem, including jurors, accusers, survivors, and judges. Rev. Parris issued his first in a series of apologies on November 26, 1694, and was removed from his position in 1697. In 1698, Hale finished composing a lengthy essay about Salem that was reprinted by George Burr in 1914.

=== Language of the period ===
The play's action takes place 70 years after the community arrived as settlers from Britain. The people on whom the characters are based would have retained strong regional dialects from their home country. Miller gave all his characters the same colloquialisms, such as "Goody" or "Goodwife", and drew on the rhythms and speech patterns of the King James Bible to achieve the effect of historical perspective he wanted.

=== Title ===
Miller originally called the play Those Familiar Spirits before renaming it as The Crucible. The word "crucible" is defined as a severe test or trial; alternately, a container in which metals or other substances are subjected to high temperatures. The characters whose moral standards prevail in the face of death, such as John Proctor and Rebecca Nurse, symbolically refuse to sacrifice their principles or to falsely confess.

== Adaptations ==
=== Film ===
- 1957 – The Crucible (also titled Hexenjagd or Les Sorcières de Salem), a joint Franco-East German film production by Belgian director Raymond Rouleau with a screenplay adapted by Jean-Paul Sartre.
- 1996 – The Crucible with a screenplay by Arthur Miller himself. The cast included Paul Scofield, Daniel Day-Lewis, and Winona Ryder. This adaptation earned Miller an Academy Award nomination for Best Screenplay Based on Material Previously Produced or Published, his only nomination.
- 2014 – The Old Vic's production of The Crucible which starred Richard Armitage and directed by Yaël Farber was filmed and distributed to cinemas across the UK, Ireland, and the United States.

=== Stage ===
The play was adapted by composer Robert Ward as an opera, The Crucible, which was first performed in 1961 and received the 1962 Pulitzer Prize for Music and the New York Music Critics' Circle Award.

William Tuckett presented a ballet at The Royal Ballet in London in 2000 to a collage of music by Charles Ives with designs by Ralph Steadman. A production by Helen Pickett for the Scottish Ballet was first performed in 2019 at the Edinburgh International Festival; its American premiere was in May 2020 at The Kennedy Center's Eisenhower Theater in Washington, D.C.

=== Television ===
The play has been presented several times on television. A 1968 production starred George C. Scott as John Proctor, Colleen Dewhurst (Scott's wife at the time) as Elizabeth Proctor, Melvyn Douglas as Thomas Danforth, and Tuesday Weld as Abigail Williams. A production by the Royal Shakespeare Company at the Gielgud Theatre in London's West End in 2006 was recorded for the Victoria and Albert Museum's National Video Archive of Performance.

== Awards and nominations ==
=== Original Broadway production ===
Year	Award	Category	Nominee	Result
1953	New York Drama Critics' Circle	Best American Play	Arthur Miller	Nominated
1953	Tony Awards	Best Play	Arthur Miller	Won
1953	Tony Awards	Best Producer of a Play	Kermit Bloomgarden	Won
1953	Tony Awards	Best Featured Actress in a Play	Beatrice Straight	Won

=== 2002 Broadway revival ===
Year	Award	Category	Nominee	Result
2002	Tony Award	Best Revival of a Play	The Crucible	Nominated
2002	Tony Award	Best Actor in a Play	Liam Neeson	Nominated
2002	Tony Award	Best Actress in a Play	Laura Linney	Nominated
2002	Tony Award	Best Featured Actor in a Play	Brian Murray	Nominated
2002	Tony Award	Best Direction of a Play	Richard Eyre	Nominated
2002	Tony Award	Best Lighting Design	Paul Gallo	Nominated
2002	Drama Desk Award	Outstanding Revival of a Play	The Crucible	Nominated
2002	Drama Desk Award	Outstanding Actor in a Play	Liam Neeson	Nominated
2002	Drama Desk Award	Outstanding Featured Actor in a Play	Brian Murray	Nominated
2002	Drama Desk Award	Outstanding Direction of a Play	Richard Eyre	Nominated
2002	Drama League Award	Distinguished Production of a Revival		Won
2002	Outer Critics Circle Award	Outstanding Revival of a Play	The Crucible	Nominated
2002	Outer Critics Circle Award	Outstanding Actor in a Play	Liam Neeson	Nominated
2002	Outer Critics Circle Award	Outstanding Actress in a Play	Laura Linney	Nominated

=== 2016 Broadway revival ===
Year	Award	Category	Nominee	Result
2016	Tony Award	Best Revival of a Play	The Crucible	Nominated
2016	Tony Award	Best Actress in a Play	Sophie Okonedo	Nominated
2016	Tony Award	Best Featured Actor in a Play	Bill Camp	Nominated
2016	Tony Award	Best Lighting Design of a Play	Jan Versweyveld	Nominated
2016	Drama Desk Award	Outstanding Featured Actor in a Play	Bill Camp	Nominated
2016	Drama Desk Award	Outstanding Music in a Play	Philip Glass	Won
2016	Drama League Award	Distinguished Revival of a Play		Nominated
2016	Outer Critics Circle Award	Outstanding Revival of a Play	The Crucible	Nominated
2016	Outer Critics Circle Award	Outstanding Actor in a Play	Ben Whishaw	Nominated
2016	Outer Critics Circle Award	Outstanding Featured Actor in a Play	Jim Norton	Nominated
2016	Theater World Award		Ben Whishaw	Won

== Editions ==
- Miller, Arthur The Crucible (Harmondsworth: Viking Press, 1971); ISBN 0-14-02-4772-6 (edited; with an introduction by Gerald Weales. Contains the full text based on the Collected Plays, and various critical essays)
- Miller, Arthur The Crucible Drama in Two Acts (Dramatists Play Service, Inc., © 1954, by Arthur Miller (Acting Edition))

== See also ==
- The Devils
- John Proctor Is the Villain
