= Sarah Osborne =

17th-century American colonist convicted of witchcraft during the Salem Witch Trials

- Born: Sarah Warren c. 1643; Watertown, Massachusetts Bay Colony
- Died: May 29, 1692; Boston, Massachusetts, Province of Massachusetts Bay
- Known for: Accused of witchcraft in the Salem witch trials
- Spouse(s): Robert Prince (died 1674); Alexander Osborne

Sarah Osborne (also variously spelled Osbourne, Osburne, or Osborn; née Warren, formerly Prince, (c. 1643 – May 29, 1692) was a colonist in the Massachusetts Bay Colony and one of the first women to be accused of witchcraft in the Salem witch trials of 1692. Sarah Osborne was suggested to be a witch by Sarah Good. Sarah Good said she had been tormenting the girls.

== Early life and marriages ==
Born Sarah Warren, Osborne was born in Watertown, Massachusetts in the mid-1600s. She later married a prominent man by the name of Robert Prince. Prince was the brother-in-law and neighbor of Captain John Putnam, a member of the notable Putnam family. She moved with her husband to Salem Village in 1662, where the couple had two sons and a daughter: Joseph, James, and Elizabeth. Robert Prince died in 1674. Shortly following Robert Prince's death, Osborne hired an Irish indentured immigrant. Eventually, Alexander Osborne paid off his indenture, and the two married. Despite late Prince's wishes to carry-over his 150-acre farm to his two sons, Osborne upset social norms when she overtook the property for herself and her new husband. Because Prince's will designated that the land would go to his sons once they came of age, Osborne's taking of this property entered her into legal issues with her children. Putnam, as the executor of Prince's will, was also inevitably involved in these legal proceedings.

== Accusation ==
Sarah became one of the first accused of witchcraft at the beginning of the year 1692, when Betty Parris became ill with an unidentified sickness. Together, she and Abigail Williams claimed that Sarah Osborne, along with Tituba and Sarah Good, had been afflicting them. Elizabeth (Betty) Hubbard also accused Osborne of afflicting her, describing it as her pinching and poking her with knitting needles.

All three women were considered social outcasts, albeit for different reasons. Tituba was an enslaved woman for Samuel Parris and his family; she and Sarah Good were both poor women, whereas Osborne was not. Osborne had not attended church in almost three years due to a long illness suspected to be depression, and was still dealing with legal issues with the Putnam family. The accusations against Osborne likely were the product of powerful suggestions from the Putnam family. The warrant for Sarah Osborne's arrest was written for March 1, 1692. She was to be placed in the Boston jails for the duration of her examinations and trials and was sent to Boston along with Tituba and Sarah Good on March 7, 1692. During her examinations, she claimed she was innocent and denied being involved with evil spirits or hurting the children. She did not confess, nor did she accuse anyone else. This contrasts Tituba's account, who confessed to witchcraft and claimed that Osborne and Sarah Good participated in witchcraft with her. Osborne died in jail on May 29, 1692, believed to have been 49 years of age.

== Reasons for accusation ==
Many of the accused in Salem were perceived to upset the established patterns of propriety and Osborne certainly broke social norms. Many in Salem knew about her fornication with Alexander, and by endeavoring to gain full ownership of her late husband's estate she ignored the tradition of family alliances in Salem as she was denying her two sons wealth and social position. The Putnam family's economic stability grew less secure by Osborne's attempt at economic independence. It was likely the Putnam family that accused Osborne.

== Media ==
- Osborne is mentioned in the original version of Arthur Miller's The Crucible but does not appear as a character. Miller added her (along with other characters) into a courtroom scene when he wrote the screenplay for the 1996 film adaptation. In the drama, her name is spelled "Osburn". She was portrayed as a very pathetic character by actress Ruth Maleczech, an impoverished and obviously deranged beggar but also aware that she is in grave danger. As no evidence indicates that Osborne was mentally ill, her movie depiction may be a composite character of Osborne and Sarah Good, the latter of whom was known to mutter and insist she was reciting the Ten Commandments, as does the Osborne character in the movie.
- "Goody Osburn" is mentioned in episode 5 of True Blood's season 3.
