= Sarah Good =

American colonist executed during the Salem Witch Trials (1653–1692)

- Born: Sarah Solart; July 21 [O.S. July 11], 1653 (Note: Contemporary records commonly used the Julian calendar and the Annunciation Style of enumerating months and years. By the Gregorian calendar and using modern style dating, all of the witch trial events in this article occurred in 1692. See also: Old Style and New Style dates; Dual dating); Wenham, Massachusetts Bay Colony
- Died: July 29 [O.S. July 19], 1692; Salem Town, Province of Massachusetts Bay
- Cause of death: Execution by hanging
- Occupation: Housewife
- Known for: Convicted of witchcraft in the Salem witch trials
- Spouses: Daniel Poole (died 1682); William Good
- Children: Dorothy Good (also known as Dorcas Good); Mercy Good
- Parents: John Solart (father); Elizabeth Solart (mother)

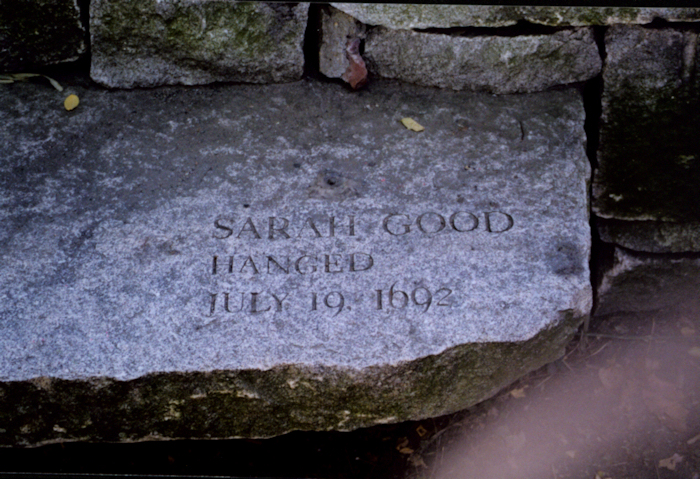
Memorial Stone for Sarah Good at Salem

Sarah Good (née Solart; July 21 [O.S. July 11], 1653 – July 29 [O.S. July 19], 1692) was one of the first three women to be accused of witchcraft in the Salem witch trials, which transpired in 1692 in colonial Massachusetts.

== Biography ==
Sarah Solart was born in 1653, the daughter of a well-to-do tavern owner in Wenham, Massachusetts named John Solart. In 1672, when she was 17 years old, her father committed suicide. His 70-acre was valued around 500 pounds and he left no will. At the time of his death, the Solarts were one of many families involved in land disputes around Salem. The estate was divided mostly between his widow and two sons, with only a small allotment to be shared among seven daughters; however, even this was denied to the girls by their mother's new husband. Sarah was left with no dowry and no prospects beyond marriage to an indentured servant named Daniel Poole who left her heavily in debt when he died soon after.

The small portion of land that Sarah had received from her father's estate was lost in a suit filed by Poole's creditors. She and her new husband, William Good, sold the remainder leaving them impoverished and homeless, and were forced to beg from the households of Salem. It was rumored that she walked off "muttering" after Samuel Parris gave her charity, and she developed a reputation for being unpleasant whether she received charity or not. When Samuel and Mary Abbey gave her lodgings for a time they said she was "so turbulent a spirit, spiteful and so maliciously bent" that they put her out. Her husband told the examiners that she was "an enemy to all good". When accused of never attending church she said it was because she hadn't any proper attire for the services.

== Accusation ==
Sarah was accused of witchcraft on March 6, 1692 [O.S. February 25, 1691], when Abigail Williams and Elizabeth Parris, related to the Reverend Samuel Parris, claimed to be bewitched under her hand. The young girls asserted they had been bitten, pinched, and otherwise abused. They would have fits in which their bodies would appear to involuntarily convulse, their eyes rolling into the back of their heads and their mouths hanging open. When the Rev. Samuel Parris asked "Who torments you?" the girls eventually shouted out the names of three townspeople: Tituba, Sarah Osborne, and Sarah Good.

=== Theories behind the accusations ===
Sarah was of a lower economic status, reduced to poverty due to the inheritance customs which cut out daughters and the debt of her first husband, Daniel Poole. Accusers at the trials, especially in the trial of Sarah Good, often cited jealousy and envy as explanations for witches' discontent and anger. Her dependency on neighbors and others perpetuated suspicions of Good, and that other dependent women like her were practicing witchcraft. Another theory behind the accusations was explained by her relationship with her husband and her neighbors. William Good claimed he feared that his wife was a witch due to "her bad carriage to him", indicating he disliked her demeanor or how well she met his expectations for a wife. She was accused by her neighbors because she challenged Puritan values, and she was accused of possessing two women; the afflictions were often sporadic and inexplicable.

== Trial ==
On March 25, 1692 [O.S. March 15, 1691], Good was tried for witchcraft. She was accused of rejecting the religious puritanical expectations of self-control and discipline when she chose to torment and "scorn [children] instead of leading them towards the path of salvation". When she was brought in, the accusers immediately began to rock back and forth and moan, seemingly in response to Good's presence. Later in the trial, one of the accusers fell into a fit. When it had stopped, she claimed Good had attacked her with a knife; she even produced a portion of it, stating the weapon had been broken during the alleged assault. However, upon hearing this statement, a young townsman stood and told the court the piece had broken off his own knife the day before, and that the girl had witnessed it. He then revealed the other half, proving his story. After hearing this, Judge William Stoughton simply scolded the girl for exaggerating what he believed to be the truth.

Although both Good and Sarah Osborne denied the allegations against them, Tituba admitted to being the "Devil's servant". She stated that a tall man dressed all in black came to them, demanding they sign their names in a great book. Although initially refusing, Tituba said, she eventually wrote her name, after Good and Osborne forced her to. There were six other names in the book as well but were not visible to her. She also said that Good had ordered her cat to attack Elizabeth Hubbard, causing the scratches and bite marks on the girl's body. She spoke of seeing Good with black and yellow birds surrounding her, and said that Good had also sent these animals to harm the girls. When the girls began to have another fit, Tituba claimed she could see a yellow bird in Good's right hand. The young accusers agreed.

When Good was allowed the chance to defend herself in front of the twelve jurors in the Salem Village meeting house, she argued her innocence, proclaiming Tituba and Osborne as the real witches. In the end, however, Good was convicted of witchcraft and sentenced to death. On July 19, 1692, Sarah Good was hanged along with four other women convicted of witchcraft. While the other four quietly awaited execution, Good firmly proclaimed her innocence. The Rev. Nicholas Noyes was persistent, but unsuccessful, in his attempts to force Good to confess. When she was found guilty by the judges, including Noyes, according to legend she yelled to him: "I'm no more a witch than you are a wizard, and if you take away my life God will give you blood to drink", although this sentence does not appear in any of contemporary reports of the execution. There is also a legend that, twenty-five years later, Noyes died from choking on his own blood.

Good was pregnant at the time of her arrest and gave birth to an infant in her cell in the jail in Ipswich. The infant died before her mother was hanged.

In 1710, William Good successfully sued the Great and General Court for health and mental damages done to Sarah and Dorcas, ultimately receiving thirty pounds sterling, one of the largest sums granted to the families of the witchcraft victims.

== In popular culture ==
- In John Neal's 1828 novel Rachel Dyer, Sarah Good pronounces a curse from the gallows that may have inspired Matthew Maule's curse in Nathaniel Hawthorne's The House of the Seven Gables.
- Sarah Good is featured in the song "Sarah Good" by the American metal band "Buried Voices".
- The quote "I'm no more a witch than you are a wizard, and if you take away my life God will give you blood to drink" is printed on the CD "Darker Circles" by the Canadian psychedelic/country band the Sadies.
- In Supernatural, season 14 episode 13, Sarah Good is mentioned as her skull being an occult object.
- in Rizzoli & Isles, season 2 episode 7 Bloodlines, there are three alleged witches, at least one of whom claims to be a descendant of Sarah Good.

== Sources ==
- Hansen, Chadwick. (1969). Witchcraft at Salem. New York, NY: George Braziller; ISBN 978-0807611371.
- Upham, Charles (1980). Salem Witchcraft. New York: Frederick Ungar Publishing Co. (2 volumes), v. 2 pp. 11–17, 268-69, 480
