= Abigail Williams =

Accuser in the Salem witch trials

- Born: c. 1681
- Died: Unknown
- Known for: First accuser in the Salem witch trials
- Relatives: Samuel Parris (uncle); Elizabeth "Betty" Parris (cousin)

Abigail Williams (born c. 1681, date of death unknown) was an Massachusetts colonist who, as an 11 or 12-year-old girl was, along with nine-year-old Betty Parris, among the first of the children to accuse their neighbors of witchcraft in 1692; these accusations eventually led to the Salem witch trials.

== Salem witch trials ==
In early 1692, Abigail Williams was living with her relative Samuel Parris, the pastor of Salem Village. Also in the household were Parris's daughter Betty and two enslaved people who worked for him: Tituba and John Indian.

Tituba was part of a group of three women — with Sarah Good and Sarah Osborne — who were the first to be arrested, on February 29, 1692, under the accusation that their specters (ghosts) were afflicting the young girls in Parris' household. The three women were questioned separately but were aware of each other and, in a classic prisoner's dilemma, they were turned against each other. Sarah Good was the first interrogated and held to her innocence. Judge John Hathorne directed all "the children ... to look upon her and see if this were the person that hurt them ... and they all did look upon her" and claimed her specter tormented them. "Sarah Good ... why do you thus torment these poor children?" Hathorne asked. "What do I know, you bring others here and now you charge me with it," Sarah Good responded. Next Hathorne interrogated Sarah Osbourne, who claimed not to know Sarah Good or her full name. But Hathorne told her, "Sarah Good said that it was you that hurt the children." According to the transcript, this distorts what Sarah Good had said, as she had only vaguely referred to the others without naming them, in a way that was only intended to deflect blame from herself. Tituba was interrogated last and was the only of the three women to offer a full and elaborate confession against herself and pointing the finger of blame at the other two women: "Sarah Good and Osbourne would have me hurt the children."

According to an investigation by Robert Calef that began soon after the trials, Tituba later recanted her confession as forced and claimed abuse from the slaveowner Parris:

"The account she [Tituba] since gives of it is that her master [Parris] did beat her and otherwise abuse her, to make her confess and accuse, such as he [Parris] called her 'sister-witches' and that whatever she said by way of confessing or accusing others, was the effect of such usage."

Further accusations against many others emerged from the Parris household (and others) and eventually led to the imprisonment of hundreds and the deaths of more than 20 in 1692. Sarah Osborne died in prison in May and Sarah Good was executed on July 19 along with four other women. Members of Parris' household all managed to survive the entire episode including Tituba, who was released from jail a year later, when the slaveowner Parris paid her prison fees and sold her.

== Later life ==
After the Salem witch trials, Williams disappeared from records circa 1696. Her fate is unknown.

== Legacy ==
=== The Crucible ===
In Arthur Miller's 1953 play, The Crucible, a fictionalized story of the Salem witch trials, Abigail Williams' age in the play is raised a full five or six years, to age 17, and she is motivated by a desire to be in a relationship with John Proctor, a married farmer with whom she had previously had an affair. In the historical record, there is no evidence of John Proctor and Abigail Williams ever meeting before the trials had started. She was portrayed by Madeleine Sherwood in the original Broadway production and by Winona Ryder in the 1996 film adaptation of the play. Other actresses who have played the role include Tuesday Weld and Saoirse Ronan.

The play was also adapted into an opera in 1961 by composer Robert Ward, an adaptation that won a Pulitzer Prize for Music; Abigail is one of the prominent soprano parts.

=== Other popular culture ===
In John Neal's 1828 novel Rachel Dyer, Abigail Williams appears as the character Bridget Pope. Neal links the origin of the witch hysteria to her sexual development, and her bewitched behavior stems from sexual frustration that is calmed too late when she is reunited with her love interest, Robert Eveleth, after the trials have already begun.

Abigail Williams is an American black metal band formed in 2004.

Abigail Williams appears in the 2010 film The Sorcerer's Apprentice as a minor antagonist.

The 2013 play, Wonders of the Invisible World (originally titled A Discourse on the Wonders of the Invisible World) by Liz Duffy Adams tells the fictional story of Abigail William's return to New England ten years after the witch trials.

Abigail is revealed as the antagonist of the 2014 video game Murdered: Soul Suspect. In the story, flashbacks reveal that she was hanged for her part in the witch trials. Over the centuries, she has existed as a ghost, using her supernatural powers to kill those she believes are witches. In the game's climax, she is seized by demons and dragged to Hell.

Fate/Grand Order, a 2015 online free-to-play role-playing mobile game, has a character under the "Foreigner" class based on both Abigail Williams and Yog-Sothoth. She plays a central role in the plot of the last Pseudo-Singularity chapter, Salem, which takes place during an alternate version of the Salem witch trials.

The 2020 video game Little Hope includes a spin-off of Abigail's history and the Salem witch trials as one of the three timelines.

Abigail is the central character in the play Abigail/1702: A Twice Told Tale, by Roberto Aguirre-Sacasa. Its mainstage world premiere was at the Cincinnati Playhouse in the Park on January 24, 2013.

=== Convulsive ergotism ===
In 1976, Linnda R. Caporael put forward the hypothesis that ergot-tainted rye may have been the source of accusations of bewitchment that spurred the Salem witch trials. Ergot poisoning was known then as "St. Anthony's Fire" or "Holy Fire". Caporael argued that many of its convulsive symptoms were all symptoms reported in the Salem witchcraft records. This theory has been refuted by both toxicologists and historians of the Salem witch trials, in part because of the difference in the ages of the core group of accusers, which would have been younger, per prior ergotism epidemics, and would have affected males and females roughly equally. The ergotism theory is critiqued for failing to explain the differences in affliction rates between males and females and that no records suggest the allegedly affected experienced all symptoms to ergotism or had long-term health effects. Additionally, most historical outbreaks of ergotism would affect entire families or communities who shared a similar diet. At the severity of supposed symptoms experienced by accusers, the levels of ergot would have been high enough to cause symptoms in adults in the community.

== See also ==
- List of people who disappeared mysteriously (pre-1910)
