= Betty Parris =

Accuser in the Salem witch trials (1682–1760)

- Born: November 28, 1682; Boston, Massachusetts Bay Colony
- Died: March 21, 1760 (aged 77); Concord, Province of Massachusetts Bay
- Known for: Accuser in the Salem witch trials
- Spouse: Benjamin Baron (m. 1710; died 1754)
- Children: 4
- Relatives: Samuel Parris (father); Abigail Williams (cousin)

Elizabeth Parris (November 28, 1682 – March 21, 1760) was one of the young girls who accused other people of being witches during the Salem witch trials. The accusations made by Parris and her cousin Abigail Williams caused the direct death of 20 Salem residents: 19 were hanged, while another, Giles Corey, was pressed to death.

== Early life ==
Parris was born in Boston, Massachusetts, on November 28, 1682. Her father, Samuel Parris, was a well-known minister in the Salem Church. Her mother, Elizabeth Parris, died a few years after the witch trials. Her older brother Thomas Parris was born in 1681, and her younger sister Susanna Parris was born in 1687. Others living in the Parris household included Betty's orphaned cousin, Abigail Williams, and Tituba, an enslaved woman from Barbados.

Her father was appointed the Minister of Salem Church in 1688 following a community effort to find a new minister. His family, including his wife Elizabeth, son Thomas, daughters Betty and Susannah, Abigail Williams, and Tituba all moved from Boston to join Parris in Salem. By contract, Parris and his family were granted to live in the ministry house and owned the land around it. The house accommodated the whole Parris family including Abigail, Tituba, and another slave by the name of John.

== Salem witch trials ==
=== Overview ===
In 1692, the Salem witch trials broke out after several girls claimed to be targeted by a 'devilish hand'. After several months, over 150 men, women, and children were charged with witchcraft and sorcery. The Trials were diminishing around September 1692 when the public began to resist the idea of witchcraft. Eventually, the Massachusetts General Court granted freedom to all those accused of sorcery and apologized to their families for the hardships created by the Salem witch trials.

=== Betty Parris' role ===
Shortly after Samuel Parris' affairs with the church in 1692, his daughter Elizabeth (Betty) Parris and niece Abigail Williams seemed to go missing for short periods of time. "... Along with other New England youth, Elizabeth and Abigail had been led away with little Sorceries" (105). Elizabeth, Abigail, and the girls attempted fortune-telling methods during their missing periods in hopes of discovering future husbands and social statuses. They used an object called a "Venus glass", which allowed them to observe the shape of an egg white as it floated in a glass of water. In the water, the egg white would resemble a shape or symbol depicting their futures. In one instance, a girl found a coffin shape inside her glass and became quite frightened after the incident according to John Hale's A Modest Enquiry Into the Nature of Witchcraft.

Betty's other friends were also beginning to show similar symptoms of bewitching. Town physician William Griggs found it difficult to key in on an exact cure and noticed the victims were only children. This enabled other villagers to believe that this event was indeed brought on by witchcraft. A neighbor, Mary Sibley, recommended a witch's cake to reveal the names of the witches. She instructed Tituba to bake a rye cake with the victim's urine and feed the cake to a dog. Dogs were believed to support witches and their supernatural powers by following the witches' requests. Without alleviation of the illness, Betty eventually named Tituba as one of the 'Evil Hands'. Linder suggests Elizabeth and Abigail wrote their story before making any accusations allowing their scenario to be more realistic. In the meantime, Tituba underwent questioning, and other victims, such as Ann Putnam Jr. and Elizabeth Hubbard, began to name their culprits as well. Other specified witches including Sarah Osborne and Sarah Good were questioned. All three would likely have had few of any advocates on their behalf due to their low social status in Salem. During their trials, Tituba confessed as well as turning in the other two women.

Later that year in March, Elizabeth dreamed about a "Black Man" who she presumed was the Devil. He wanted her to join his forces and be "ruled by him." However, Betty's family found this extremely terrifying and sent her off to live with another family, the Sewalls, hoping she could get away from witchcraft. In the Sewall household, Betty did experience some symptoms but ultimately regained full health.

== Later life ==
In 1693, the Salem witch trials ended. Betty Parris never retracted her accusations or made any acknowledgements.

In 1710, aged 27, she married Benjamin Baron, a yeoman, trader, cordwainer, and shoemaker. Her father still cared for her and her siblings. Parris provided her with "household stuff" to better furnish her home with Benjamin. He bought her silver, money, and plates as well as pictures and décor to hang on the walls. She and Baron had four children: Thomas, Elizabeth, Catherine, and Susanna. Betty survived her husband by six years, dying on March 21, 1760, in Concord, Massachusetts, aged 77.

== In fiction and popular culture ==
Betty Parris appears as Samuel Parris' daughter in John Neal's historical novel, Rachel Dyer (1828).

Arthur Miller's 1952 play The Crucible is loosely based on actual events that Betty/Elizabeth Parris and other contributing characters faced during the actual Salem Witch Trials in the 1600s. Some aspects of the play are accurate in comparison to the real event while others are not. According to all reliable sources, Elizabeth had two siblings, and in The Crucible she has none. She is a supporting character as a 10-year-old girl who falls under a strange illness, which leads to dissembling a bunch of young women's behavior and, soon, many accusations of witchcraft against other citizens of Salem.
