= Tituba =

17th-century enslaved woman involved in the Salem witch trials

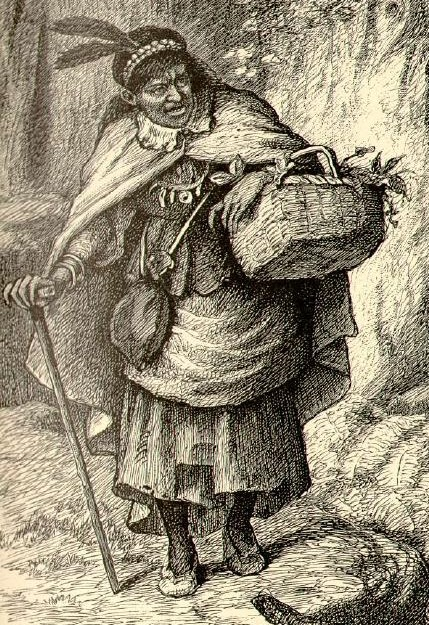
- Illustration of Tituba by John W. Ehninger, 1902
- Other name: Tattuba (possibly)
- Occupations: Slave, possibly a cook
- Known for: Accused of witchcraft during the Salem Witch Trials
- Criminal charge: Witchcraft
- Criminal penalty: None (held for trial for over a year but never convicted)
- Criminal status: Case dismissed
- Spouse: John Indian

Tituba (c. 1675–1693) was an enslaved Indigenous American (Note: Only after the 19th century was Tituba's origin changed from native to "Caribbean". In all literature up to the 19th century, Tituba is described as an enslaved native woman.) woman who was one of the first to be accused of witchcraft during the Salem witch trials of 1692–1693.

She was enslaved by Samuel Parris, the minister of Salem Village, in the Province of Massachusetts Bay. She was pivotal in the trials because she confessed to witchcraft when examined by the authorities, giving credence to the accusations. She accused two other women, Sarah Good and Sarah Osborne, of the same crime. She was imprisoned for over a year but never tried. What happened to her after a grand jury dismissed the case against her in May 1693 is unknown.

== Early life ==
The only records of Tituba pertain to her central position in the Salem witch trials, where she appears as an Indigenous woman enslaved by a local minister named Samuel Parris. It is not known how Parris acquired Tituba as a slave; she was not from Massachusetts.

The sole source for Tituba's birthplace is Thomas Hutchinson, who wrote in 1764 – decades after the witch trials – that she had been "brought into the Country from New Spain". Later historians have taken this to mean the Caribbean or more specifically Barbados (an English colony), but this is speculation. In the 1990s, Elaine G. Breslaw identified her with a "Tattuba", born circa 1662–1666, who was documented as enslaved to one Samuel Thompson in Barbados in 1674. Breslaw proposed that the name 'Tituba' was derived from the Tetebetana clan of Lokono peoples, who lived in the Orinoco delta (modern Venezuela); and that she was captured as a child. Other historians including Peter Charles Hoffer and Samuel Drake have suggested that Tituba was from Africa. In 1998, Bernard Rosenthal objected to both lines of argument as compounded speculation. He observed that Barbadian slaves were indeed generally African, but Tituba was universally described as an 'Indian' in Puritan sources.

In support of the theory connecting Tituba to Barbados, Elaine Breslaw and Charles Upham pointed to Samuel Fowler's writing, "Account of the Life of Samuel Parrish", which described Tituba's eventual master Samuel Parris as transporting slaves from there. While there is no direct evidence to prove this theory, Breslaw presumes that she was Samuel Thompson's family cook, as most enslaved Native Americans were. Tituba would have interacted with a diverse group of people in Barbados, likely picking up knowledge about witchcraft and Obeah from mistresses and other enslaved people.

Samuel Thompson inherited his farm in 1676, then fell deathly ill in 1679 and deeded his estate to others. No evidence links Thompson to Parris, but the Thompson estate was in flux at this time, and "Tattuba" could have been purchased or inherited by Parris, who returned to Massachusetts in 1680. There is no surviving record, however, of a woman named Tattuba or Tituba being transferred.

Tituba's husband was called "John Indian", and his origin is unknown. His name is an apparent exonym, and he may have been a Wampanoag or another Native American from New Spain. John became one of the accusers in the Salem witch trials. They appear documented together in Samuel Parris's church record book.

== Salem witch trials ==
Tituba was the first person to be accused of practicing witchcraft by Elizabeth Parris and Abigail Williams. It has been theorized that Tituba told the girls tales of Haitian Vodou and witchcraft before the accusations. Tituba was allowed to speak against her accusers despite her race because it was not illegal for slaves to give testimony in court. She was also the first person to confess to practicing witchcraft in Salem Village in January 1692. Initially denying her involvement in witchcraft, Tituba later confessed to making a "witch cake", but she confessed to making it only after Samuel Parris beat her. Tituba also confessed to speaking with the devil, and in her confession, she stated that he ordered her to worship him and hurt the children of the village.

When she was questioned later, she added that she learned about occult techniques from her mistress in "her own Country" (presumably Barbados), who taught her how to ward herself from evil powers and reveal the cause of witchcraft. Since such knowledge was not supposed to be harmful, Tituba again asserted to Parris that she was not a witch. Still, she admitted that she had participated in an occult ritual when she made the witch cake in an attempt to help Elizabeth Parris. Due to how young the accusers were, the accusation did not get taken to court, but Samuel Parris still beat Tituba in an attempt to get her to confess. A month later, Tituba, Sarah Good, and Sarah Osborne were accused of witchcraft again, this time by two adult women who were able to get the accusation taken to court. Tituba, Sarah Good, and Sarah Osborne were sent to jail in Boston to await trial and punishment on March 7, 1692. Despite these confessions, there is no proof that she did the things to which she confessed.

Other women and men from surrounding villages were accused of practicing witchcraft and arrested during the Salem witchcraft trials. Tituba not only used these outlandish accusations to stir confusion among Massachusetts residents, but she also used them to displace the punishment and death sentence that could have been imposed upon her. By deflecting people's attention, she convinced others that she was a credible witness, and her recognition saved her life and reputation. Tituba must have been aware that she could not hide from the accusations which were being made against her due to certain prejudices which people held against her based on her ethnicity. She claimed not to be a witch and denied that accusation against her despite her use of occult practices, admitting that the devil visited her and Parris' determination to find her guilty. Her confession and accusations not only served as a scapegoat, they also served as a new form of entertainment to the residents of Salem as they experienced possessions because of her words.

Not only did Tituba accuse others in her confession, but she talked about black dogs, hogs, a yellow bird, red and black rats, cats, a fox, and a wolf. Tituba talked about riding sticks to different places. She confessed that Sarah Osborne possessed a creature with the head of a woman, two legs, and wings. Since it mixed various perspectives on witchcraft, Tituba's confession confused listeners, and its similarities to certain stock tropes of demonology caused some Salem Village residents to believe that Satan was among them.

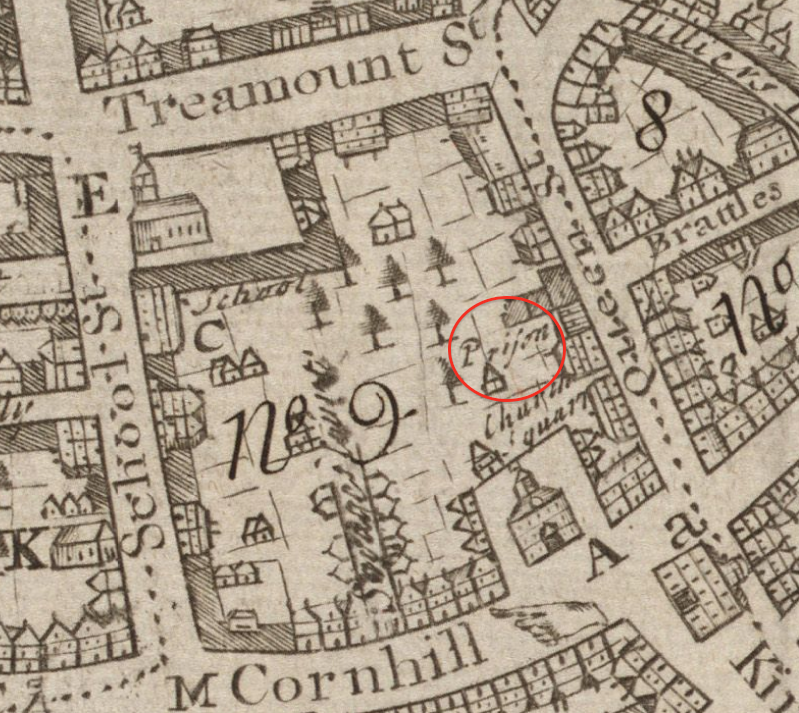
Tituba was held at Boston Gaol (circled on map).

After the trials, Tituba remained in Boston Gaol, which had deplorable living conditions, for thirteen months because Samuel Parris refused to pay her jail fees. During that time, she would testify in other trials of accused witches. In April 1693, Tituba was sold to an unknown person for the price of her jail fees.

In an interview with Robert Calef for his collection of papers on the trials, titled More Wonders of the Invisible World: Being an Account of the Trials of Several Witches, Lately Executed in New-England, Tituba confirmed that Parris had beaten a confession out of her and then coached her on what to say and how to say it when she was first questioned.

There is no record of Tituba or John Indian after 1693. In 1694, Parris apologized to the people of Salem for his role in the witch trials. In 1711, Massachusetts offered compensation to victims of the trials, but Tituba's name was not listed among those compensated; she may have been deceased by this time. She may have had a daughter, as an "Indian woman" named Violet is named in Parris's will in 1720, but nothing is known of Violet's life either.

== In popular culture ==
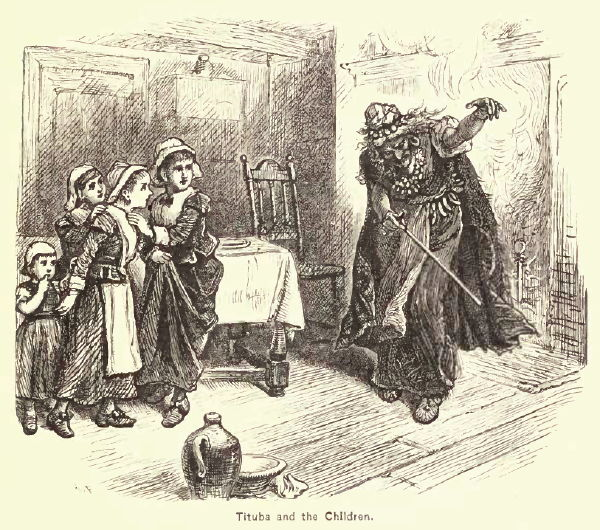
Tituba, as portrayed in the 19th century by artist Alfred Fredericks in W.C. Bryant's A Popular History of the United States

The majority of fictional pieces that artistically or historically depict Tituba's life erroneously portray her as a black woman, or a member of an out-group by Puritan society due to her racial and socioeconomic status, and as an indentured servant or slave. Although it is not explicitly discussed in all of the movies, plays and books, that account for Tituba's conviction, it is quite possible that the "fear of strangers", in combination with the Western European traditional belief and understanding of witchcraft, made Tituba a prime target for witchcraft conviction.

With reference to the historical understanding of Tituba and why she was convicted, it has been argued that the pre-existing ideas about out-groups and stereotypical ideas of foreign cultures combined with fictional portrayals of witchcraft and sorcery works, has created a case where history and fiction shape each other. Essentially, the fictional works have assisted in the idea of what the Salem Witch Trials were like and what events lead to the convictions, trials and confessions, but without factoring in racial, political, religious and economic influences of the time, the portrayals of Tituba in media remain, for the most part, fictional.

In John Neal's 1828 novel Rachel Dyer, a socially isolated Matthew Paris (based on Samuel Parris) feels threatened by Tituba's relationship with John Indian and is motivated to accuse her of witchcraft as a result. Neal described her as a "female Indian" who "did the drudgery of the house".

Henry Wadsworth Longfellow, in his 1868 play entitled Giles Corey of the Salem Farms, describes Tituba as "the daughter of a man all black and fierce ... He was an Obi man, and taught [her] magic". Obeah (also spelled Obi) is a specifically African and Afro-American system of magic.

Tituba is featured prominently in the 1953 play The Crucible by Arthur Miller. The image of Tituba as the instigator of witchcraft at Salem was reinforced by the opening scene of The Crucible, which owes much to Marion L. Starkey's historical work The Devil in Massachusetts (1949).

In Miller's play, Tituba is said to have come from Barbados, where she was taught how to conjure up spirits and had allegedly dabbled in sorcery, witchcraft, and Satanism. The play suggests that Abigail Williams and the other girls tried to use Tituba's knowledge when dancing in the woods before the trials began; it was their being caught that led to those events. With the original intention of covering up their own sinful deeds, Tituba was the one to be accused by Abigail, who had drunk from a magic cup Tituba made to kill John Proctor's wife, Elizabeth, and to bewitch him into loving her. She and the other girls claimed to have seen Tituba "with the Devil". Ironically, the belief that Tituba led these girls astray has persisted in popular lore, fiction, and nonfiction. The charge, which is seen by some as having barely disguised racist undertones, is based on the imagination of authors like Starkey, who mirrors Salem's accusers when she asserts that "I have invented the scenes with Tituba ... but they are what I really believe happened."

Tituba appears in the novel Calligraphy of the Witch (2007) by Alicia Gaspar de Alba as an Arawak woman from Guyana fluent in several languages and the only person in the Boston area who understands Spanish. She is a friend and English tutor to the indentured servant Concepción Benavidez, who is accused of witchcraft in the Boston area because of her Mexican and Catholic culture.

In American Horror Story: Coven (2013–2014), young witch Queenie states that she is a descendant of Tituba. Later in the series, Voodoo Queen Marie Laveau and Supreme witch Fiona Goode have an in-depth discussion of Tituba's history and legacy. They suggest her magic came from her Arawak ancestry.

In Salem (2014–2017), Tituba (Ashley Madekwe) is portrayed as an enslaved biracial woman of Arawak descent who made a deal with the Devil and taught witchcraft to leading character Mary Sibley, née Walcott (Janet Montgomery), plotting against Puritan settlers.

Tituba is portrayed in the Jayce Landberg song Happy 4 U, featured on the album The Forbidden World (2020).

Tituba is the protagonist of Maryse Condé's 1986 novel, I, Tituba: Black Witch of Salem. The English translation includes a foreword by activist and academic Angela Y. Davis.

== See also ==
- List of slaves
- List of people of the Salem witch trials

== Bibliography ==
- Breslaw, E.G. (1996). Tituba, Reluctant Witch of Salem: Devilish Indians and Puritan Fantasies. New York: New York University Press. ISBN 0814713076.
