= Samuel Parris =

American minister in Salem (1653–1720)

The Reverend Samuel Parris
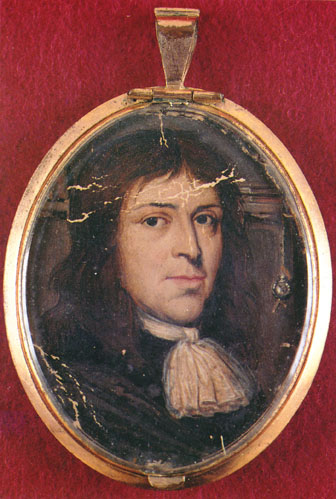
- Portrait of Samuel Parris
- Born: 1653; London, England
- Died: February 27, 1720 (aged 66–67); Sudbury, Massachusetts, Province of Massachusetts Bay
- Education: Harvard College
- Known for: Father and uncle of Salem witch trials accusers; accuser along with his daughter and niece
- Spouses: Elizabeth Eldridge (m. 1680; died 1696) Dorothy Noyes (m. 1699)
- Children: Thomas Parris; Elizabeth Parris; Susannah Parris
- Relatives: Abigail Williams (niece)

Samuel Parris (1653 – February 27, 1720) was a Puritan minister in the Province of Massachusetts Bay. Also a businessman and one-time plantation owner, he gained notoriety for being the minister of the church in Salem Village, Massachusetts during the Salem witch trials of 1692. Accusations by Parris and his daughter against Tituba, an enslaved woman, precipitated an expanding series of witchcraft accusations.

== Life and career ==
Samuel Parris, son of Thomas Parris, was born in London, England to a family of modest financial success and religious nonconformity. Samuel immigrated to Boston in the early 1660s, where he attended Harvard College at his father's behest. When his father died in 1673, Samuel left Harvard to take up his inheritance in Barbados, where he maintained a sugar plantation.

In 1680, after a hurricane hit Barbados, damaging much of his property, Parris sold a little of his land and returned to Boston, where he brought the woman he enslaved, Tituba, and married Elizabeth Eldridge. Eldridge was noted by many as being incredibly beautiful, and was said to be one of the most beautiful women in Salem Village. Together they had three children, Thomas Parris, Elizabeth Parris, and Susannah Parris. Although the plantation supported his merchant ventures, Parris was dissatisfied with his lack of financial security and began to look to the ministry. In 1685 he briefly served as minister in Stow Massachusetts. In July 1689, he became minister of Salem Village (now Danvers), Massachusetts. This position gave Samuel Parris the power to jail the people of Salem and even used it on rare occasions.

Salem Village was a contentious place to live and was known to be quarrelsome by neighboring towns and villages. Its dispersed settlement pattern may have resulted in a lack of a sense of common purpose that may have united more orderly and arranged communities. Parris was the fourth minister appointed in a series of unsuccessful attempts to keep a permanent minister. James Bayley (1673–1679) and George Burroughs (1680–1683) each stayed only a few years, departing after the congregation failed to pay their full rates. Deodat Lawson (1684–1688) left with less contention. Further tension was caused by Parris' delay in accepting the position and his inability to resolve his parishioners' disputes. There were also disputes over Parris' compensation. In October 1691, the town decided to stop paying his wages. These issues, and others that were more personal between the villagers, continued to grow unabated.

The events which led to the Salem witch trials began when Parris' daughter, Betty, and her cousin, Abigail Williams, accused Tituba, the woman Parris enslaved, of witchcraft. Parris beat Tituba until she confessed herself as a witch, and John Indian, her husband, began accusing others. The delusion spread, and many were apprehended, most of whom were imprisoned. During the 16-month duration of the Salem witch trials phenomenon, 19 persons were hanged, and one, Giles Corey, was pressed to death.

During a 1692 sermon, Parris declared that "as in our text John 6:10 there was one devil among the 12 disciples... so in our churches, God knows how many Devils there are", encouraging antagonistic villagers to locate and destroy "witches" who, as it happened, were frequently individuals with whom Parris and his key allies, the Putnam family, had taken umbrage.

As Parris had been an active prosecutor in the witchcraft cases, in 1693, his parish brought charges against Parris for his part in the trials. Parris apologized in his essay Meditations for Peace, which he presented in November 1694. Increase Mather led a church council which then vindicated him.

Parris was then involved in a dispute with his congregation over parsonage land he had seized to compensate himself for the salary he was owed. The dispute found its way to an Ipswich court, which, in 1697, ordered his salary to be paid and the land to be returned. By 1696, however, he had found his situation untenable. He resigned that year and left Salem. Records in the Suffolk Deeds indicate it likely he returned to business in Boston in 1697.

His wife Elizabeth died in 1696. In 1699, he remarried, to Dorothy Noyes, in Sudbury. He returned to preach for two or three years at Stow. He then moved to Concord (1704/05). He also preached for six months in Dunstable in 1711. He died on February 27, 1720, in Sudbury.

== Fiction ==
Parris features in Arthur Miller's 1953 play The Crucible, set against the backdrop of the witch trials. In the play, his daughter Elizabeth Parris is the first to become ill because of supposed witchcraft, of which she is accused. In the 1957 and 1996 film adaptations of Miller's play, he was portrayed by Jean Debucourt and Bruce Davison, respectively.

Author John Neal made Parris a character in Rachel Dyer (1828), which is the first bound novel about the witch trials. In this version of the story his name is Matthew Paris, a socially isolated man who is threatened by Tituba's relationship with John Indian and accuses her out of sexual frustration.

Parris is also a character in the 1964 novel Tituba of Salem Village by Ann Petry and the 1986 novel I, Tituba: Black Witch of Salem by Maryse Condé, both books depicting the witch trials.

In the novel Supernatural: One Year Gone, Parris is portrayed as having been manipulated by the real witches into starting the trials and also manipulated the girls to accuse his enemies and rivals to get rid of them. At the end of the novel, after the truth is revealed, he swears to put an end to the innocent women.

Road to Endor was written in 1940 by Esther Barstow Hammand. It uses facts from Parris' life and weaves them into fictional life. Hammand tells readers in an author's note, "This book is fiction. Although I have delved into many old records and used all reasonable care to dig up whatever historical facts are available, the research has been hampered by unusual difficulties." The tale begins with Samuel's birth and continues until the dreaded year of the trials.

== Music ==
Samuel Parris is portrayed in the Jayce Landberg song "Happy 4 U", featured on Landberg's 2020 album The Forbidden World.

== Bibliography ==
- Fiske, Sarah Symms (1704). A Confession of Faith: or, A Summary of Divinity. Drawn Up By a Young Gentle-Woman, in the Twenty-Fifth Year of Her Age. Boston: Benjamin Elliot.
- Gragg, Larry (1990). A Quest for Security: The Life of Samuel Parris, 1653–1720. New York: Greenwood. ISBN 978-0-313-27282-0.
- Rines, George Edwin, ed. (1920). "Parris, Samuel" . Encyclopedia Americana.
- Starkey, Marion L. (1949). The Devil in Massachusetts: A Modern Inquiry into the Salem Witch Trials. New York: Alfred A. Knopf. pp. 26–28.
- Stearns, Raymond P. (1934). "Parris, Samuel". Dictionary of American Biography. New York: Charles Scribner's Sons.

Attribution
