= Deodat Lawson =

British-American minister

Deodat Lawson was a British-American minister in Salem Village from 1684 to 1688 and is famous for a 10-page pamphlet describing the witchcraft accusations during the Salem Witch Trials in the early spring of 1692. The pamphlet was billed as "collected by Deodat Lawson" and printed within the year in Boston, Massachusetts.

== Early life and education ==
Deodat Lawson was born in Norfolk, England. His mother died within a few weeks of his birth. He likely received an education near his birthplace. One historian compliments Lawson's fine handwriting. The work attributed to Lawson displays great erudition but there is no record of his having attended Cambridge, Oxford, or Trinity College. It is possible Lawson attended one of the semi-clandestine dissenting academies.

By 1671, Lawson had travelled to Martha's Vineyard in the New England Colonies. The diarist Samuel Sewall first records him coming to Boston in 1681. He was a minister in Salem Village beginning in 1684 when several church members (including Peter Cloyce, husband of Sarah Cloyce a woman who would be among the first accused of witchcraft in 1692) were sent by the church to get a boat and help him move his belongings up to Salem. Lawson seems to have never reached mutually agreeable terms in order to be ordained and hold a covenant with the church of Salem Village. While at the Village, Lawson's wife and daughter died. (This subject would be revisited in 1692, see below.)

By the spring of 1688, Lawson returned to Boston and he seems to have been an itinerant preacher over the next four years. In 1690, Lawson remarried to a woman named Deborah Allen.

=== Preaching for Andros ===
On 19 July 1688, Lawson preached a proclamation day sermon for the Dominion of New England governor Andros, as was reported in a letter to Increase Mather by Samuel Sewall. It is not clear if this may have been perceived as something of a betrayal to the Mathers, as Increase Mather had only recently fled to England to avoid prosecution under Andros government. In most cases, religious services for Andros were in keeping with the Church of England not that of the Puritans. A strange reference to Lawson's preaching sermons for Andros arose later during the witchcraft trials in the deposition of a twelve-year-old accuser in August 1692. This deposition was presented in the trial of Lawson's predecessor George Burroughs, with Increase Mather in attendance.

=== Sinful failings ===
There seems to be no surviving record of anything untoward in Lawson's behavior while at Salem Village, but in a sermon ("Satan's Malignities") attributed to him, and printed under his name in 1693, he begins a dedication to the inhabitants of the Village by acknowledging that his previous ministry "attended with manifold sinful failings and infirmities, for which I do implore, the pardoning mercy of God in Jesus Christ, and entreat from you the covering of love." The next section of the sermon ("To the Reader") seems to gather and grasp for sources to support Lawson's qualifications, including quoting of a letter from Lawson's own father, which was solicited by "Ministers of Boston." But soon this section also dips toward a debasing confessional: "And wherein I have at any time, given just offense, to the meanest of those that fear the Lord, I do heartily beg their pity and prayers..." This section was removed when the sermon was reprinted a decade later in London.

== Salem Witch-phobia ==
=== The pamphlet: A Brief Narrative of Some Remarkable Passages at Salem Village ===
==== Promoted by the Mathers ====
Unlike the zealous Cotton Mather and his powerful father Increase Mather, Deodat Lawson does not appear to have published works on witchcraft (if anything else) prior to this pamphlet published under his name ("collected by") in 1692. One historian of the "Bibliography of Witchcraft" considered the introduction to have most likely been written by Cotton Mather, and it is noticeable that the printer, Benjamin Harris, also produced the two lengthy books on witchcraft by the Mathers that summer and fall—a very large commission for a colonial printer.

==== The Ghostly Lawson ====
Lawson's brief narrative covers 19 March–5 April 1692. Oddly, none of the numerous court records and depositions covering the same period list the presence of Lawson in Salem Village. A deposition by Ann Putnam Sr lists a number of the same dates including the sabbath day, 20 March, without mentioning Lawson or whoever it was that preached the sermon that day. On 23 March, Lawson (or Lawson's narrator) says he paid a visit Ann Putnam Sr. to witness her afflictions, but Ann Putnam Sr. doesn't mention the presence of this out-of-town guest in describing her afflictions on that day, and the very next day, during an examination, the court asked not for Lawson but instead for the Rev. Samuel Parris to read his notes of a visit to Ann Putnam Sr. Thus, it seems that some portions of what was "collected by" Lawson would best be understood as the accounts of others, including Parris.

==== The Omission of Testimony from the Contra Side ====
Rev. Samuel Parris was tasked by the court with recording by hand the examination of Rebecca Nurse on 24 March, and he omitted any testimony from those speaking in her defence. On the reverse side of this record Parris did sheepishly admit "great noises" by the afflicted and "many speakers" prevented him from capturing everything. Perhaps for the same reason Deodat Lawson's published account of this exam also contains no mention of any testimony in defense of Nurse, and Lawson's narrator likewise proffers an excuse: "I had not leisure to attend the whole time of examination." The only record of the existence of a "contra side" speaking in defense of Nurse comes from a brief note on the back of the official order to arrest Nurse.

Deodat Lawson's account of the exam of Martha Cory quotes a line from Rev. Nicholas Noyes declaring her a witch while omitting his next clause as recorded in the court record, "...there is no need of images." Thus Lawson's account withholds information that suggests the sheriff had searched her home for physical evidence relative to the practice of witchcraft and found nothing.

==== An Incorrect Date ====
Deodat Lawson's "Brief Narrative" matches the official court records in a variety of ways while also containing curious differences and mistakes such as the incorrect listing of "Sacrament Day" on 3 April (it was 27 March). This may have been a simple error but "Sacrament Day"—when the Lord's Supper was administered—was highly significant to Puritans, and never more so than during this time period with certain accusations regarding the capital crime of witchcraft tied directly to it. "None ought, nor is it possible that any should, maintain communion with Christ, & yet keep up fellowship with Devils," Parris wrote in the 27 March entry of his sermon book. Young Abigail Williams had even helpfully announced it advance on 21 March, "The next sabbath is Sacrament day, but she [Martha Cory] shall not come there." Deodat Lawson's account also includes a version of the examination of Martha Cory on this date which suggests the account was constructed hastily and at some distance from Salem Village where such discrepancies would have been easily checked and corrected.

=== The sermon: Christ's Fidelity Against Satan's Malignity... Delivered at Salem-village, the 24th of March 1692 ===
In his pamphlet describing the happenings at Salem, Lawson briefly mentions that 24 March is "Lecture Day at the Village" but nothing more is said about the sermon delivered on that Thursday, or how it was received by the same audience that had been described as unruly and disruptive during the sermons on 20 March. What makes this surprising is that the sermon said to have been delivered on that day, and published within a year under Lawson's name, was a persuasive, lengthy, and elaborate tour de force. GL Burr describes the sermon as "no extempore production, but a studied disquisition on the power and malice of the Devil, who 'Contracts and Indents with Witches and Wizzards, that they shall be the Instruments by whom he may more secretly Affect and Afflict the Bodies and Minds of others.'" CW Upham calls it "a thoroughly elaborated and carefully constructed performance, requiring long and patient application to compose it, and exhausting all the resources of theological research and reference, and of artistic skill and finish."

Cotton Mather records that he took multiple "journeys" to Salem in his memoirs, and in a 2 September 1692 letter to Chief Justice Stoughton he writes that "one half of my endeavors to serve you have not been told or seen." In fact there is no record of Mather having delivered a sermon in Salem Village in 1692. Yet there is a noticeable affinity between the 24 March 1692 sermon and Cotton Mather's sermons on the subject published in Wonders of the Invisible World. If the "Satan's Malignity" sermon can be fully attributed to Deodat Lawson, and him alone, Lawson may need to be re-considered as a strong influence on the younger Cotton Mather. However, subterfuge from Cotton Mather should not be ruled out: in the 2 September 1692 letter from Mather to Stoughton he speaks of employing "designed contrivances."

The "Satan's Malignity" sermon has a publishing date of 1693 and is dedicated to several of the judges who had been on the deadly Court of Oyer and Terminer in the summer of 1692 but who were excluded from the new Superior Court that took its place (with orders to disregard "spectral evidence") when it was dissolved later that year.

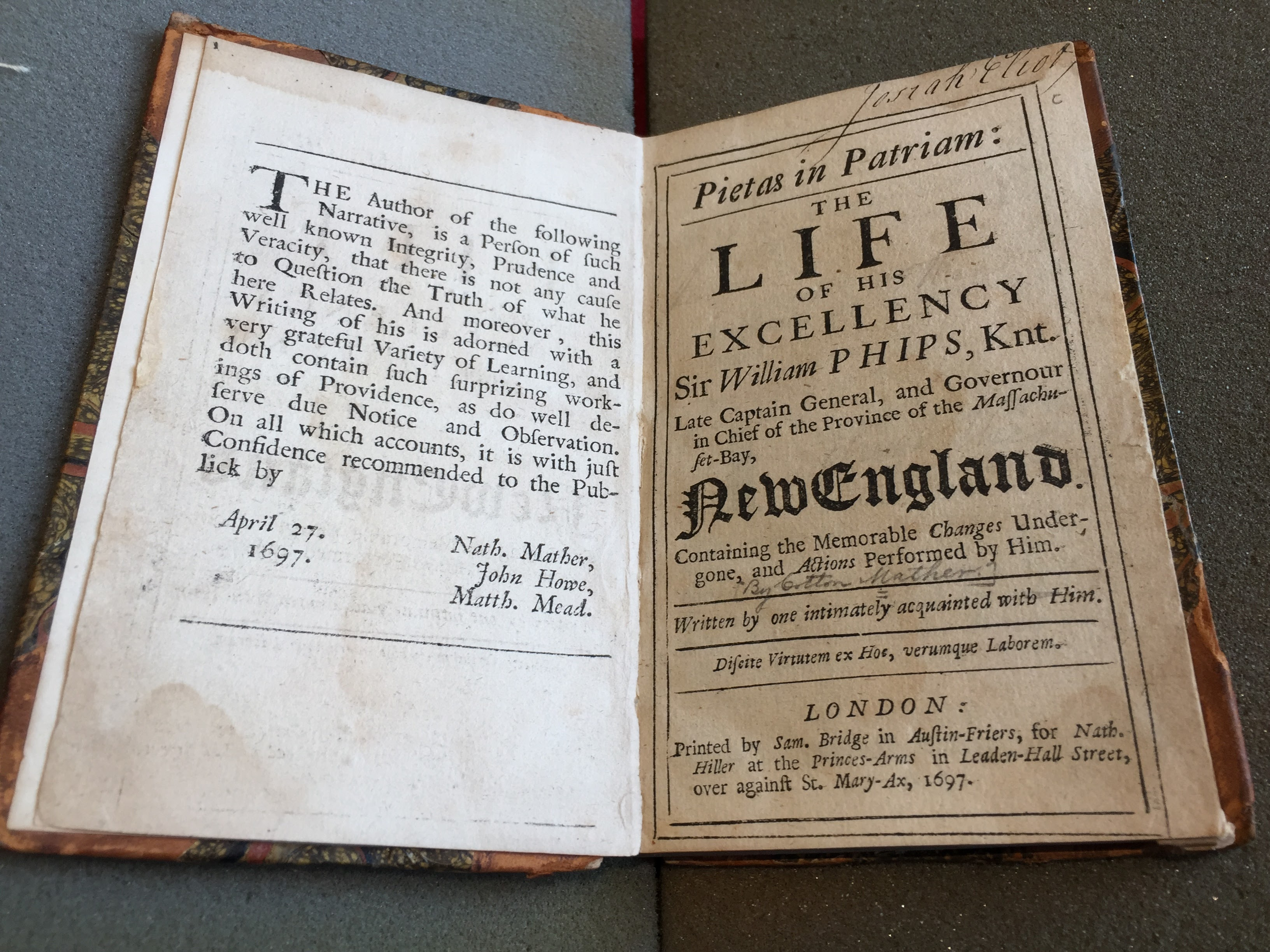
Cotton Mather's anonymous Life of Phips

The printed sermon also claims an endorsement by a circle of ministers who were all part of the Cambridge Association. It is unknown how widely the sermon was distributed in the decade or so after its first printing. At least one copy made it from Boston to Salem Village ("William Griggs his Book 1692") but there doesn't seem to be any contemporary mention of it during this period. John Hale's timeline makes no direct mention of the sermon. Robert Calef also seems to take no notice of it despite Calef having published a manuscript that Cotton Mather was passing around to his friends in 1693, the title of which --"Another Brand Pluckt Out of the Burning"—shares a refrain with the 24 March 1692 sermon. The "another" in the title denotes it having been a sequel to the first "Brand Pluckt" Mather wrote in the winter of 1692-3 (16 March is the last internal date) in which Mather referred to himself anonymously in the third person. It is not fully understood why Mather wrote anonymously at this time or why he was unable or unwilling to get his two "Brand Pluckt" manuscripts into print. A handful of years later, Mather attempted to remain anonymous by printing in London a posthumous biography of William Phips (see photo) until he was identified as the author by Robert Calef.

==== Move to Scituate and More Publications ====
Samuel Sewall's diary mentions Lawson in the Boston area for the last time on 27 December 1692, in Watertown, alongside William Stoughton and others. In 1693, Lawson became a pastor at the Second Church in Scituate, which had been tied to Plymouth and governed by the Plymouth General Court until the previous year. Lawson continued to have success publishing, with some help from the Mathers, including a sermon printed in Boston in the summer of 1693 under the "imprimatur" of Increase Mather dated 27 July 1693. In 1694, Lawson published a poem called "Threnodia," a memorial of a Scituate captain who was lost at sea.

==== Forsaking Scituate ====
"When the Rev. Mr. Lawson forsook this church he left no catalog of them that were baptized by him."

In 1696, Lawson seems to have departed for England and left things in disarray, with little or no notice to the church in Scituate. This lack of record-keeping was unusual for a pastor and according to the doctrine expressed in the 24 March 1692 sermon, Lawson thereby left these church members vulnerable to "satan's malignity."

== A Return to England and A Descent into Abject Poverty ==
=== Reprinting the Witch-phobic Sermon ===
Back in England in 1696, Lawson seems to have been known for his contemporaneous account of Salem perhaps because the "Brief Narrative" been included in London editions of Cotton Mather's Wonders of the Invisible World (WIW) in 1693. Lawson claims that he was solicited to reprint the witch-phobic sermon from 24 March 1692, "...but for some particular reasons I did then decline it." By 1704, a second edition of the 24 March 1692 sermon was printed and sold with an appendix that included some of the information from the "Brief Narrative" in a different form, incorporating information provided by Cotton Mather (in WIW) and presented as two lists, one regarding the afflicted and a separate one on the accused. In this version, all dates and identifying information (including initials) were removed with the exception of a reference to "the ghosts of my wife and daughter."

=== The Uneven, Unwary, and Unhappy Deodat Lawson ===
By 1714, Lawson had fallen into a poverty so extreme that he worried about feeding his "three young children." He begged help from New England merchants to front money to print another sermon, one that he'd recently delivered on the occasion of the Royal Coronation of King George.

Lawson's poverty likely stemmed from his having been excluded from the ministry and defrocked. In 1713 and again in 1715, Lawson made attempts to restore "the exercise of his ministry" by confessing to "uneven and unwary conversation."

Lawson's attempts to restore himself to a better position do not appear to have succeeded. In 1727, he was described as "the unhappy Mr. Deodat Lawson" and this seems to be the last heard of him.

=== An end to witch-phobic accusations in the English realm ===
Around the time of Lawson's increasing unhappiness, Francis Hutchinson published a broad attack on witch-phobia that included a lengthy treatment of Salem. Hutchinson cites the work of Robert Calef and blames the influence of the Mathers in the decade leading up to events at Salem, as well as the English clergyman Richard Baxter. Deodat Lawson was not considered important or influential enough to earn a mention in Hutchinson's work. Whereas Calef had focussed on Christian doctrine and called out witch-phobia as an unorthodox "notion" and addressed numerous letter to the influential ministers of New England, Hutchinson dedicates his work to powerful judges and focusses on the spurious, unreliable, and ridiculous nature of the accusations especially when brought before a court of judicature. The arguments of Hutchinson and Calef helped pave the way to the repeal of the Witchcraft Act in 1736.
