= Spectral evidence =

Reported supernatural visions used as legal testimony

Spectral evidence was a form of legal evidence based upon the testimony of those who claim to have experienced visions.

Such testimony was frequently given during the witch trials of the 16th and 17th centuries. The alleged victims of witchcraft would claim to have been tormented by the spectral images of certain named members of the community; this was taken as evidence that those named were witches, and had given the Devil permission to assume their appearance. If accepted by a court, this testimony was virtually impossible to refute. However, spectral evidence was rarely used to secure a conviction, as theologians were unable to agree that the Devil could not take on the shape of an innocent person. The debate about the validity of spectral evidence rose to a climax with the Bury St Edmunds witch trials of 1662, and the Salem witch trials of 1692–93.

== Bury St Edmunds witch trial ==
At the Bury St Edmunds witch trial of 1662, charges of witchcraft were brought against Amy Denny and Rose Cullender, two elderly residents of Lowestoft, Suffolk, England. The trial acquired lasting significance (chiefly due to the involvement of Matthew Hale, "one of the greatest legal figures" of the 17th century), and became an important precedent for the admissibility of spectral evidence. A published report of the trial, titled A Tryal of Witches at the Assizes Held at Bury St. Edmunds, was consulted by magistrates presiding over the Salem witch trials, thirty years later.

The suspected witches, Amy Denny and Rose Cullender, were accused of bewitching several of their neighbours' children. The alleged victims were reported to be suffering from fits, lameness, and temporary speech loss, and were often said to have been seen coughing up pins. The evidence which tied these afflictions to Denny and Cullender was the testimony of the children that they had often been threatened by apparitions of these women. For instance, Samuel Pacy made the following statement concerning his two daughters:

In their fits they would cry out, There stands Amy Duny, or Rose Cullender; and sometimes in one place and sometimes in another, running with great violence to the place where they fancied them to stand, striking at them as if they were present; they would appear to them sometimes spinning, and sometimes reeling, or in other postures, deriding or threatning them.

Not everybody present at the trial accepted this evidence unquestioningly. Three Serjeants-at-Law, among them John Kelynge, raised an objection (although the trial report appears to have been altered, to attribute this objection to Kelynge alone). According to the report:

Mr. Serjeant Keeling seemed much unsatisfied with it [the evidence], and thought it not sufficient to Convict the Prisoners: for admitting that the Children were in Truth Bewitched, yet said he, it can never be applyed to the Prisoners, upon the Imagination only of the Parties Afflicted; For if that might be allowed, no person whatsoever can be in safety, for perhaps they might fancy another person, who might altogether be innocent in such matters.

The judge, Hale, may have taken this point into consideration when he remarked to the jury that they had two questions to consider: "First, Whether or no these Children were Bewitched? Secondly, Whether the Prisoners at the Bar were Guilty of it?" Nevertheless, the jury found Denny and Cullender guilty of thirteen of the fourteen charges brought against them, and they were sentenced to death by hanging.

== Salem witch trials ==
=== Initial accusations ===
The Salem witch trials began in February 1692, when four children of Salem, Massachusetts, began suffering from fits, and complained of being "bitten and pinched by invisible agents". According to the examination of the children by William Griggs, the local physician in Salem, he assessed that the children were "under an evil hand". For over a month, Samuel Parris, the father of one of the children affected, limited his response to prayer and fasting. He later changed this strategy and pressed his child and the other children to name their assailants. The children accused Sarah Good, Sarah Osborne, and the slave Tituba, crying out "that they or specters in their shapes did grievously torment them".

Brought before the magistrates, Good and Osbourne denied the charges, but Tituba confessed. She claimed to have been coerced by the devil into hurting the children; she had also been threatened by a tall man in black clothes, who made her sign her name in a book. She said that Good and Osbourne were also witches, and described their familiars, which no-one else could see; Good's was a yellow bird, and Osbourne's were two grotesque creatures. While this testimony was being given, the children broke out into fits, and Tituba claimed to see the spectre of Sarah Good attacking them. All three women were indicted, and were returned to jail to await trial.

This was the beginning of a mass hysteria which saw numerous residents of Salem and surrounding towns arrested on charges of witchcraft. The children's accusations and later, Tituba's confession had a far-reaching influence, and set the tone for later claims made against the accused. It was often said that apparitions of the suspected witches had tried to compel their victims to write their names in a book, and both the man in black and the yellow bird were seen in the company of several of the accused, including Martha Corey, Rebecca Nurse, and Sarah Cloyce. Another prominent form of spectral evidence was the appearance of the spirits of the dead, as minister Deodat Lawson wrote:

They affirm'd, That they saw the Ghosts of several departed Persons, who at their appearing, did instigate them, to discover such as (they said) were Instruments to hasten their Deaths; threatening sorely to afflict them, if they did not make it known to the Magistrates.

In May 1692, a Court of Oyer and Terminer was established to try these cases. However, the court faced the problem of how much weight to give to spectral evidence. During the pre-trial hearings, various other types of evidence had been brought against the accused – including evidence of "ordinary witchcrafts" (i.e. the casting of spells resulting in injury or property damage), the discovery of poppets, witches' marks, and signs of unusual physical strength – but only the spectral evidence had been gathered for every case. Furthermore, of the 156 people taken into custody before the court suspended its activities in September, 79 were charged on the basis of spectral evidence alone.

The strength of spectral evidence was based on the assumption that the Devil could not assume another person's shape without their consent. Deodat Lawson stressed this point in a sermon preached on 24 March. He also explained that the Devil, wherever possible, binds into his service "those that make a Visible Profession" of holiness, in order to "more readily pervert others to Consenting unto his subjection". This was an attempt to allay doubts about the fact that some of the accused, such as Nurse and Corey, were well-respected community members with a reputation for piety.

However, Puritan minister Cotton Mather took a different view. In a letter to magistrate John Richards, Mather advised the court not to place too much stress upon spectral evidence, because "it is very certain that the devils have sometimes represented the shapes of persons not only innocent, but also very virtuous". He suggested that spectral evidence should be taken as a presumption of guilt, but would not in itself be sufficient for a conviction.

=== Internal division ===
The first to be tried by the court was Bridget Bishop, who was found guilty and executed. At this point, however, a debate arose among the judges. Contrary to Mather's advice, spectral evidence had played a large part in securing Bishop's conviction, and this raised questions about the methods of the court. Formal advice was requested from the ministry, and twelve ministers of the Boston area (including Increase Mather) drew up a document entitled "The Return of the Several Ministers Consulted". Once again, caution was advised:

Presumptions whereupon persons may be committed, and, much more, convictions whereupon persons may be condemned as guilty of witchcrafts, ought certainly to be more considerable than barely the accused person's being represented by a specter unto the afflicted; inasmuch as it is an undoubted and notorious thing, that a demon may, by God's permission, appear, even to ill purposes, in the shape of an innocent, yea, and a virtuous man.

It was even suggested that a more critical approach to spectral testimonies might give "some remarkable affronts" to the devils responsible for them, and "put a period" to the troubles at Salem. On the other hand, the document closed by recommending "the speedy and vigorous prosecution" of those who had "rendered themselves obnoxious" to the laws of God and man. As a result, the overall message was equivocal. Robert Calef, a contemporary critic of the trials, called the document "perfectly ambidexter, giving as great or greater encouragement to proceed in those dark methods, than cautions against them". The presiding judge, William Stoughton, read into it only an endorsement of the previous proceedings of the court, and the other judges followed his lead – the only dissenter being Nathaniel Saltonstall, who resigned.

=== Wider controversy ===
The Court of Oyer and Terminer adjourned on 22 September, with the expectation of reconvening before long. By this time, however, with nineteen people hanged (and one, Giles Corey, crushed to death), criticism of the trials was becoming increasingly vocal and in turn, Spectral Evidence became a controversial issue.

According to historian Richard Godbeer, with the exception of confessions, the only direct evidence of any sort of diabolical witchcraft was the testimony of the afflicted children. Even then the testimonies were spectral in nature. When the children claimed to be tormented by a spectre that appeared in the image of the accused, it was taken as direct and irrefutable evidence that the accused was a witch.

On 8 October, an influential Boston merchant, Thomas Brattle, wrote an open letter arguing against the unjust proceedings of the court. Brattle rejected the validity of spectral evidence, which he claimed was the "only pertinent evidence" brought against any of the accused: "I think it is clear that the prisoner at the bar is brought in guilty, and condemned, merely from the evidences of the afflicted persons." He argued that the judges were therefore receiving testimony from the Devil, and thought it strange that they "should so far give ear to the Devill, as merely upon his authority to issue out their warrants, and apprehend people". One proof Brattle gave against spectral evidence was the following:

These afflicted persons do say, and often have declared it, that they can see Spectres when their eyes are shutt, as well as when they are open ... I am sure they lye, at least speak falsely, if they say so; for the thing, in nature, is an utter impossibility. It is true, they may strongly fancye, or have things represented to their imagination, when their eyes are shutt; and I think this is all which ought to be allowed to these blind, nonsensical girls.

It was around this time, on 29 September 1692, that the governor of the province, William Phips, who had been absent during the trials, returned to Massachusetts from Maine. In a letter of 12 October, he remarked that he had been surprised to find "many persons in a strange ferment of dissatisfaction", and on enquiring into the matter, he learned that "the Devill had taken upon him the name and shape of severall persons who were doubtless inocent and to my certain knowledge of good reputation". He suspended the trials, and forbade the incarceration of any more suspected witches. On 29 October, the court was officially dismissed. Phips next reviewed the petitions for the release of those who remained in jail, and where he found the evidence to be primarily spectral, he released the prisoners on bond to their families.

Cotton Mather defended the court's methods in his book, The Wonders of the Invisible World (which began circulating in manuscript form in October, but was not published until the following year). While admitting the possibility that "among the Persons represented by the Spectres which now afflict our Neighbours, there will be found some that never explicitly contracted with any of the Evil Angels", he suggested that these people may have been guilty of lesser offences, for which reason God had permitted the Devil "to bring in these Lesser ones with the rest for their perpetual Humiliation". Mather also cited the precedent of previous trials, including the Bury St Edmunds case.

Cotton's father, Increase Mather, took the opposite approach in his own work, Cases of Conscience Concerning Evil Spirits Personating Men. He argued that the Devil could indeed appear in the shape of an innocent person, and cited numerous authorities to that effect, including the Biblical story of the Witch of Endor. Against the argument that God would not allow the Devil to impose upon innocent people in this way, Increase brought forward the example of Job, and insisted that God's ways are inscrutable. He concluded that "to take away the Life of any one, meerly because a Spectre or Devil, in a bewitched or possessed person does accuse them, will bring a Guilt of innocent Blood on the Land, where such a thing shall be done".

However, in a postscript, Increase asserted that his work was not intended as "any Reflection on those worthy Persons who have been concerned in the late Proceedings at Salam". He recommended Cotton's account of the trials, and hoped that "the thinking part of Mankind will be satisfied, that there was more than that which is called Spectre Evidence for the Conviction of the Persons condemned".

According to Godbeer, Samuel Willard, a puritan minister, was also against the notion of Spectral Evidence as a whole and believed that the Devil could appear in the shape of an innocent person. He also noted that the Devil did not need consent and might represent a person even if the person being represented did not consent to being represented.

Godbeer further explains that the arguments of critics of spectral evidence, managed to discredit spectral evidence. Those who had confessed to being witches had taken back their confession. The discrediting of the evidence against the confessors made the collapse of the Salem Witch Trials inevitable. The disagreements on how to interpret the spectral evidence led to deep tension between the community in Salem. The tension and the disagreements made it difficult for the courts to operate consistently during the trials.

A new court convened in January 1693, to consider the remaining cases; this time, the use of spectral evidence was firmly limited. Almost all of those brought before the court were acquitted; and in May, Phips issued a general pardon, bringing the trials to an end.

== Other cases ==
Concurrent with the trials in Salem, spectral evidence was also used in a trial in colonial Rhode Island where Thomas Cornell Jr., son of Thomas Cornell, was convicted of matricide in the death of his mother, Rebecca.

== See also ==
- Apparitional experience
- Booty v Barnaby
- Greenbrier Ghost
- Eyes of Laura Mars
