= Booty =

Booty most commonly refers to:

- Booty (loot), goods or treasure seized by force
- "Booty", a slang term for the buttocks

Booty may also refer to:

== Music ==
- Booty People, 1970s American funk band
- Booty music, a subgenre of hip hop also known as Miami bass or booty bass
- "Booty" (Jennifer Lopez song), 2014
- Booty (Blac Youngsta song), 2017
- Booty (C. Tangana and Becky G song), 2018
- "Booty", a 1993 song by George Clinton from Paint the White House Black
- "Booty", a 2000 song by Erykah Badu from Mama's Gun
- "Booty", a 2007 song by Tito El Bambino from It's My Time (Tito El Bambino album)
- Booty, a 2008 album by Die Türen
- "Da Booty", a 1998 song by A Tribe Called Quest from The Love Movement
- "Booty", a 2022 single by Latto and Saucy Santana that blew up online

== People ==
- Frederick Booty (1841–1924), philatelist
- John Booty (b. 1965), American football player
- John David Booty (b. 1985), American football player
- Josh Booty (b. 1975), baseball and American football player
- Justin Booty (b. 1976), soccer player
- Kasma Booty (1932–2007), Malaysian actor
- Martyn Booty (born 1971), footballer
- Ray Booty (1932–2012), British cyclist
- Booty Wood (1919–1987), stage name of American jazz trombonist Mitchell W. Wood

== Other uses ==
- Booty (video game), released in 1984
- Booty v Barnaby, court case
- Booty Edwards & Partners, Malaysian architecture company
- Bootie, or bootee, a short soft sock or bootlike foot garment
- Pirate's Booty, puffed rice snack

== See also ==
- Bootie (disambiguation)
- Booty Bounce (disambiguation)
- Booty Call (disambiguation)
- Booty Luv
