= Türen =

Türen or Turen may refer to:

== People ==
- Kevin Turen (1979–2023), American film and television producer
- Metin Türen (born 1994), Turkish basketball player

== Other uses ==
- Tureň, village in Slovakia
- Die Türen, German band
- Turen går til, travel guide series
- Offene Türen, album
