= Bury St Edmunds witch trials =

Series of trials between 1599 and 1694

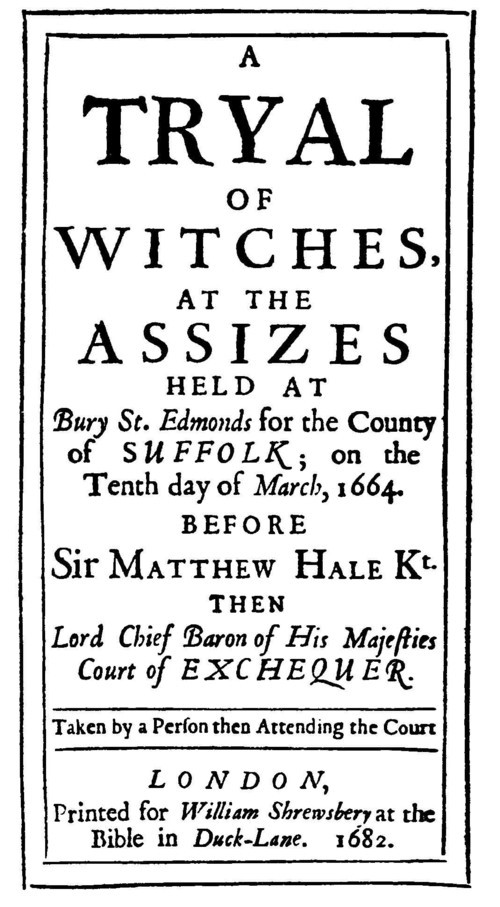
Title page of report of the 1662 Trial, incorrectly dated as 1664.

The Bury St Edmunds witch trials were a series of trials conducted intermittently between the years 1599 and 1694 in the town of Bury St Edmunds in Suffolk, England.

Two specific trials in 1645 and 1662 became historically well known. The 1645 trial "facilitated" by the Witchfinder General saw 18 people executed in one day. The judgment by the future Lord Chief Justice of England and Wales, Sir Matthew Hale in the 1662 trial acted as a powerful influence on the continuing persecution of witches in England and similar persecutions in the American Colonies.

== Jurisdiction ==
As well as being the seat of county assizes, Bury St Edmunds had been a site for both piepowder courts and court assizes, the latter since the Abbey was given a Liberty, namely the Liberty of St Edmund. For the purposes of civil government the town and the remainder (or "body") of the county were quite distinct, each providing a separate grand jury to the assizes.

== Early trials ==
The first recorded account of a witch trial at Bury St Edmunds Suffolk was of one held in 1599 when Jone Jordan of Shadbrook (Stradbroke) and Joane Nayler were tried, but there is no record of the charges or verdicts. In the same year, Oliffe Bartham of Shadbrook was executed, for "sending three toads to destroy the rest (sleep) of Joan Jordan".

== The 1645 trial ==
The trial was instigated by Matthew Hopkins, the self-proclaimed Witchfinder General, and conducted at a special court under John Godbolt. There was much to keep the minds of Parliamentarians busy at this time, with the Royalist Army heading towards Cambridgeshire, but concern about the events unfolding were being voiced. A report was carried to the Parliament that the witch-hunters were extracting confessions through torture; therefore, a special commission of oyer and terminer was formed, to ensure a fair trial. On 27 August 1645, no fewer than 18 people were executed by hanging at Bury St Edmunds. 16 of the 18 people executed that day were women. The executed were:

- Anne Alderman, Rebecca Morris and Mary Bacon of Chattisham
- Mary Clowes of Yoxford
- Sarah Spindler, Jane Linstead, Thomas Everard (cooper) and his wife Mary Everard of Halesworth
- Mary Fuller of Combs, near Stowmarket
- John Lowes, Vicar of Brandeston
- Susan Manners, Jane Rivet and Mary Skipper of Copdock, near Ipswich
- Mary Smith of Great Glemham
- Margery Sparham of Mendham
- Katherine Tooly of Westleton.
- Anne Leech and Anne Wright, origin unknown.

It has been estimated that all of the English witch trials between the early 15th and early 18th centuries resulted in fewer than 500 executions; in which case this one trial, with its 18 executions, accounted for more than 3.6% of the total.

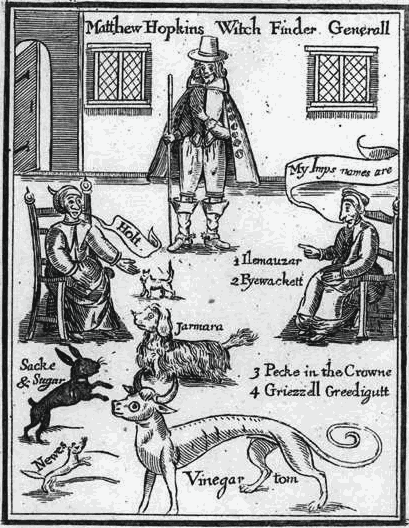
Witch Finder General, from a broadside published by Matthew Hopkins before 1650.

According to John Stearn(e), known at various times as the witch–hunter, and "witch pricker", associate to Matthew Hopkins, in his book A Confirmation and Discovery of Witchcraft, there were one hundred and twenty others in gaol (jail) awaiting trial; of these 17 were men. Thomas Ady in 1656 wrote of "about a hundred", though others record "almost 200". Following a three-week adjournment made necessary by the advancing King's Army, the second sitting of the court resulted in 68 other "condemnations"; though reports say "mass executions of sixty or seventy witches". Both Hopkins and Stearne treated the search for witches and their trials as military campaigns, as shown in their choice of language in both seeking support for and reporting their endeavours. After the trial and execution the Moderate Intelligencer, a parliamentary paper published during the English Civil War, in an editorial of 4–11 September 1645, expressed unease with the affairs in Bury:

But whence is it that Devils should choose to be conversant with silly Women that know not their right hands from their left, is the great wonder ... The(y) will meddle with none but poore old women: as appears by what we receive this day from Bury ... Divers are condemned and some executed and more like to be. Life is precious and there is need of great inquisition before it is taken away.

== 1655 Trial ==
Another recorded witch trial in Bury St Edmunds was in 1655 when a mother and daughter by the name of Boram were tried and were said to have been hanged.

== The 1662 trial ==
...especially in these times, wherein things of this nature are so much controverted, and that by persons of much learning on both sides.

Decrying the controversial ("so much controverted") nature of views on witchcraft and witch-phobia, even during the 17th century, the original pamphlet about the proceedings in 1662 A Tryal of Witches was only printed anonymously, and not until twenty years later. The original writer is described as having sat in on the proceedings and taken an account "for his own satisfaction" before passing it to another anonymous "private Gentleman's hands in the country" who later passed it to the anonymous publisher of the work who printed it 1682. Thus the three different people in this chain all chose to remain anonymous.

The trial began on 10 March 1662, when two elderly widows, Rose Cullender and Amy Duny (or Deny or Denny), living in Lowestoft, were accused of witchcraft by their neighbours and faced 13 charges of the bewitching of several young children between the ages of a few months to 18 years old, resulting in one death. They may have been aware of each other, inhabiting a small town, but Cullender was from a property-owning family, whilst Denny was the widow of a labourer. The charge of witchcraft was first brought against them by a Lowestoft merchant, Samuel Pacy, who claimed that both women had separately called at his house to purchase herring, but had been upset to be turned away. Pacy accused the women of causing the afflictions of his two daughters, Elizabeth and Deborah, age eleven and nine respectively. Pacy's sister Margaret also testified against the women. They were tried at the Assize held in Bury St Edmunds under the auspices of the Witchcraft Act 1603, by a well-respected judge Sir Matthew Hale, Lord Chief Baron of the Exchequer.

Thomas Browne attended the trial and was called upon to give his opinion. His opinion was that the accused persons were bewitched and he related similar events that had recently occurred in Denmark. These views may have influenced the jury to bring a guilty verdict . He had expressed his belief in the existence of witches twenty years earlier, and that only: "they that doubt of these, do not only deny them, but spirits; and are obliquely, and upon consequence a sort not of infidels, but atheists" in his work Religio Medici, published in 1643:

... how so many learned heads should so far forget their metaphysics, and destroy the ladder and scale of creatures, as to question the existence of spirits: for my part, I have ever believed, and do now know, that there are witches;

According to the pamphlet, the judge instructed the jury they only "had two things to enquire after. First, whether or no these children were bewitched? Secondly, whether the prisoners at the bar were guilty of it?" They were convicted on Thursday 13 March 1662 (Julian calendar) and executed four days later at Bury St Edmunds on 17 March 1662.

The 1682 pamphlet A Tryal of Witches erroneously dates the trial as March 1664, both on the front page and introduction. Original documents in the Public Record Office and other contemporary records clearly states it took place in the 14th year of the reign of Charles II (30 January 1662 to 29 January 1663).

=== A model for Salem ===
This case became a model for, and was referenced in, the Salem Witch Trials in Massachusetts. Clergyman Cotton Mather in a book promoting the on-going trials in 1692 The Wonders of the Invisible World, specifically draws attention to the Suffolk trial:

We may see the witchcrafts here most exactly resemble the witchcrafts there;... And it is here the rather mentioned, because it was a trial much considered by the judges of New England .

Cotton Mather's father, Clergyman Increase Mather was President of Harvard College during the trials at Salem (he was awarded Harvard's first doctorate during this time) and he also mentions the trials at Bury as a precedent in a work dated 3 October 1692.

Clergyman John Hale, writing five years after the Salem trials, notes that the Salem area clergy and judges consulted and referenced seven different works including an earlier (1689) work by Cotton Mather Memorable Providences and Sir Matthew Hale's description of the Suffolk trials A Tryal of Witches.

=== Hutchinson's Defense of the Accused ===
In a book published in 1718, Francis Hutchinson, a minister at the parish in Bury St Edmunds, re-visits these trials in taking up the cause of the accused. Hutchinson also includes discussion of the trials at Salem in 1692, stating that he relies on a work that shares a similar sentiment by Robert Calef. (Calef had been born and raised in Stanstead, England, only 11 miles south of Bury, before emigrating to Boston, Massachusetts. Hutchinson does not mention this about Calef, and it is unclear if he was aware of it.)

An example of Hutchinson's clear-eyed defence can be found in his treatment of the case against Amy Duny. Hutchinson notes that she had every right to scold the man who had, after all, run into the corner of her house with a cart:

And I ask, is it not likely there was either a jadish horse or a silly driver that belonged to that cart? For before the poor woman had spoken to them that cart could not keep the road but ran against her house. And without any witchcraft might not the same jadish horse or bad driver make it go wrong afterward as well as before? But this witness adds that the cart was set fast in a Gate-head, though it did not touch the posts, as far as they could perceive. But if it did not touch the posts what made them cut the post down? Will cutting down a post that is not touched dissolve a charm? But they make themselves ridiculous, that they might lay blame upon this poor woman.

== Last trial ==
The last was in 1694 when Lord Chief Justice Sir John Holt, "who did more than any other man in English history to end the prosecution of witches", forced the acquittal of Mother Munnings' of Hartis (Hartest) on charges of prognostications causing death. The chief charge was 17 years old, the second brought by a man on his way home from an alehouse. Sir John "so well directed the jury that she was acquitted".

== See also ==
- Witch trials in the early modern period
- Francis Hutchinson
- Robert Calef
- Letter from Cotton Mather to William Stoughton September 2, 1692
- Cambridge Association of Ministers
