= Bootie =

Bootie may refer to:

- Bootie (bicycle), a folding bicycle manufactured in England
- Bootie (club night), dedicated to mashups and bootlegs
- Bootie Island, an island off the northern coast of Queensland, Australia
- Bootee, a type of footwear
- The Bitty Booties, the red characters in Wee Sing in Sillyville

== See also ==
- Booty (disambiguation)
- Booty call (disambiguation)
