= Robert Calef =

Commentator on the Salem Witch trials (1648–1719)

- Baptised: 2 November 1648
- Died: 13 April 1719; Roxbury, Boston, Province of Massachusetts Bay
- Known for: Criticism of the Salem witch trials and Cotton Mather

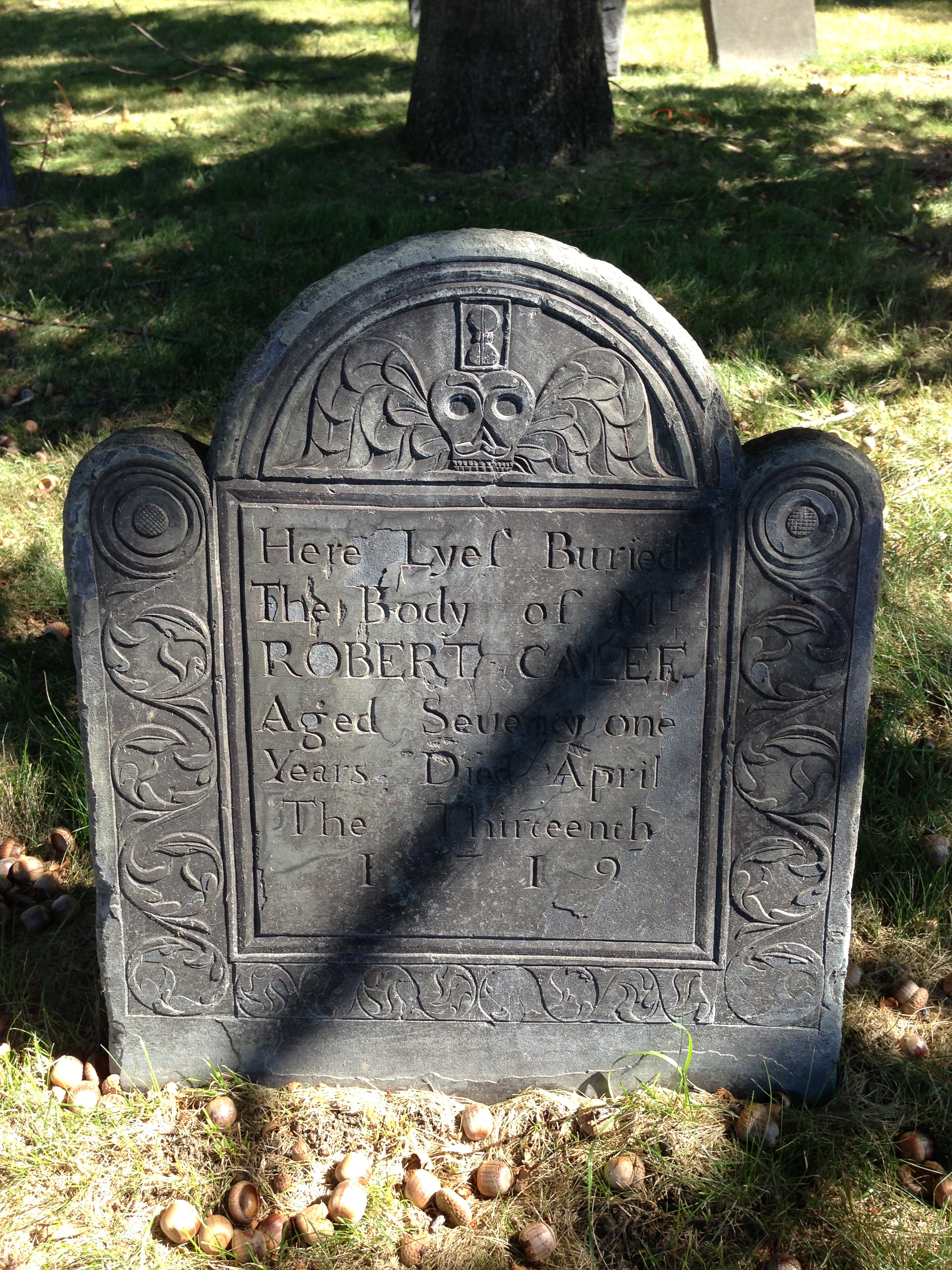
Grave of Robert Calef in Roxbury

More Wonders of the Invisible World

Robert Calef (baptized 2 November 1648 – 13 April 1719) was a cloth merchant in colonial Boston. He was the author of More Wonders of the Invisible World, a book composed throughout the mid-1690s denouncing the recent Salem witch trials of 1692–1693 and particularly examining the influential role played by Cotton Mather.

== Life and education ==
Robert Calef, son of Joseph Calef, was baptized in Stanstead, Suffolk, England on 2 November 1648. The Calef family of Stanstead was "one of substantial yeoman and clothiers." The majority of what is known about the character of Robert Calef is what can be gleaned from his single book, and it contains almost no details about his own life. His writing displays broad education and it is possible that following grammar school he attended one of England's clandestine dissenting academies as evidenced by Cotton Mather's use of the title "Mr." ("Mr. R.C") and Calef's pride in having no proficiency in Latin. (In contrast to Oxford and Cambridge, the English language was generally preferred for instruction in dissenting academies, as Latin was viewed as having ties to Rome.) According to the tradition of Calef's descendants, he matriculated from "one of the English colleges" and showed sympathy for Quakers and sought asylum in New England.

Calef emigrated to New England sometime before 1688. His children born in Boston were baptized in Boston's South Church, pastored by Samuel Willard. Calef's name does not come up in the records of the witchcraft trials of 1692-3 and, according to his book, his interactions with the Mathers began in Boston in September 1693, with most of the writing of the book and compilation of trial records complete by 1697. From 1702-04, Calef was an overseer of the poor. In 1707 he was chosen an assessor, and in 1710 a tithingman, which he declined. He retired to Roxbury, where he was a selectman. He died there on 13 April 1719.

== More Wonders of the Invisible World ==
In an effort to promote the ongoing Salem witchcraft trials, Cotton Mather (CM) wrote, Wonders of the Invisible World: Being an Account of the Tryals of Several Witches, Lately Executed in New-England, in the summer and early fall of 1692, and his father Increase Mather published his own Cases of Conscience Concerning Evil Spirits around the same time.

Robert Calef, after exchanging letters with Cotton Mather and many other area ministers, published his book More Wonders of the Invisible World, with his title being a riff on Cotton Mather's own introduction to his account of M.Rule "yet more Wonders ..." Calef objected to proceedings that lead to "a Biggotted Zeal, stirring up a Blind and most Bloody rage, not against Enemies, or Irreligious Proffligate Persons, But (in Judgment of Charity, and to view) against as Vertuous and Religious as any they have left behind them in this Country, which have suffered as Evil doers with the utmost extent of rigour." Aside from the preface and postscript, Calef begins and ends with Mather's accounts in his own words. He finished his compilation in 1697, but added a postscript before final publication.

=== Contents ===
- Preface: Calef's argument that Christians should rely on scripture, not superstition or mythology.
- Part I: Cotton Mather's own account of his visit to Margaret Rule in the autumn of 1693, which CM circulated in manuscript.
- Part II: This is the most confusing and controversial portion of Calef's book. It begins with an alternate and skeptical view of CM's ministry to Margaret Rule, referred to as a "Narrative of a Visit". Confusingly, it is presented in the first person though Calef says he copied it from eyewitness/es (both CM and Calef seem to agree that Calef was not present) on September 13, 1693, as well as an "Appendix to the Narrative" from September 19, 1693.
  - Calef's description of a lawsuit by CM and his father, against Calef, for libel, and a copy of a letter from Calef to CM November 24, 1693, (prior to their court date) requesting CM clarify his "doctrinal" beliefs on witchcraft. According to Calef, the case was dropped when neither Mather showed up in court.
    - Calef states that the Mathers no-show led him to believe "all should have been forgotten" (p. 60) but Calef is soon given a copy of CM's account of M. Rule (i.e. Part I, above) which CM began circulating soon after their court date and containing lines Calef finds offensive. Calef now sends CM what he claims as "the first copy ever taken" of the above "Narrative" and "Appendix" from September 13 and 19. This exchange seems to take place about a month or more after their court date had passed.
      - CM responds a few days later, on January 15, rejecting the portrayal of the September 13 "Narrative", and quibbling with particular details: who spoke first (he or his father), the duration of a prayer delivered by his father (30 minutes or merely 15), the location of the supposed "Imp" (on M. Rule's belly or on her pillow), and whether M. Rule's upper-body was covered by "bed-clothes" i.e. sheet and blankets, or merely by her own "cloaths." CM writes "For you cannot but know how much this representation hath contributed, to make people believe a smutty thing of me ..."
        - Calef in responding, considers any discrepancies minor, and shows great impatience with CM for not addressing the more important theological "doctrinals" underpinning his belief in witchcraft. CM sends a messenger to Calef to read a letter aloud and on another occasion CM sends Calef a letter but says it must be returned in a fortnight and "which he forbad to be Copyed." NOTE, this letter was later found, including marginalia in Calef's hand, and a typescript can be viewed beginning page 240 here
- Part III: A compilation of letters between Samuel Parris and his congregation, especially the relatives and survivors of those who were tried and executed.
- Part IV: Correspondence with an anonymous gentleman "endevouring to prove the received opinions about Witchcraft"
- Part V: A compilation of numerous testimonies and legal documents from the trials, including:
  - 1696 apology from one of the judges saying "he was apprehensive that he might have fallen into some Errors in the Matters at Salem" and
  - A letter signed by 12 members of the jury at Salem, "We do heartily ask forgiveness of you all ... and do declare according to our present minds, we would none of us do such things again on such grounds for the whole World ..."
  - CM's own preface to Wonders of the Invisible World and some portions of it.
- Postscript: Calef adds to his book a sharp response to a posthumous biography of Sir William Phips anonymously written by Cotton Mather which arrived in Boston in December 1697. Clive Holmes writes, "[Cotton Mather's] studied attempt to displace responsibility onto civil authorities was brilliantly diagnosed and savaged by Calef in his comments on the 1697 Life of Phips."
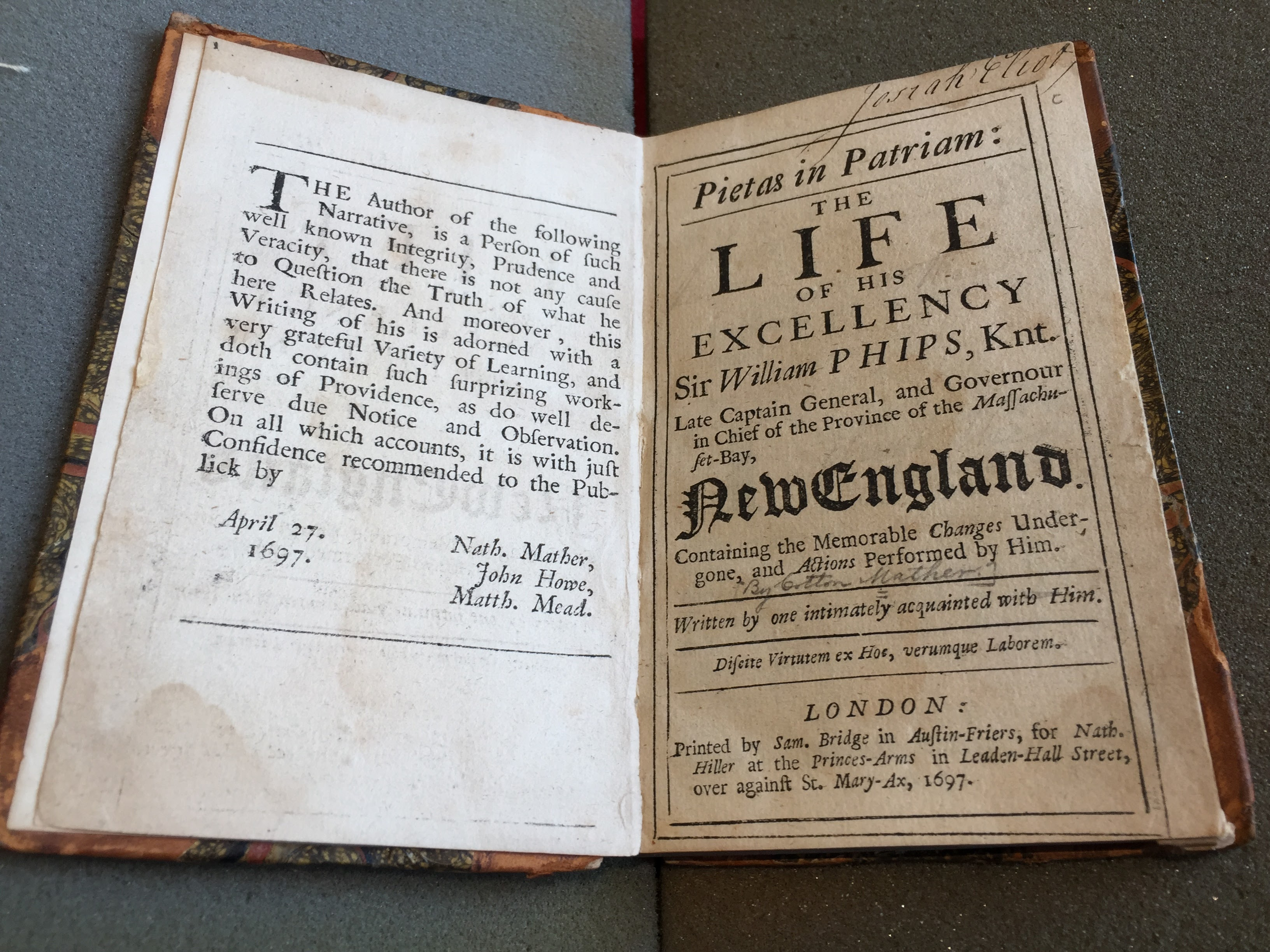
  Cotton Mather's anonymous Life of Phips

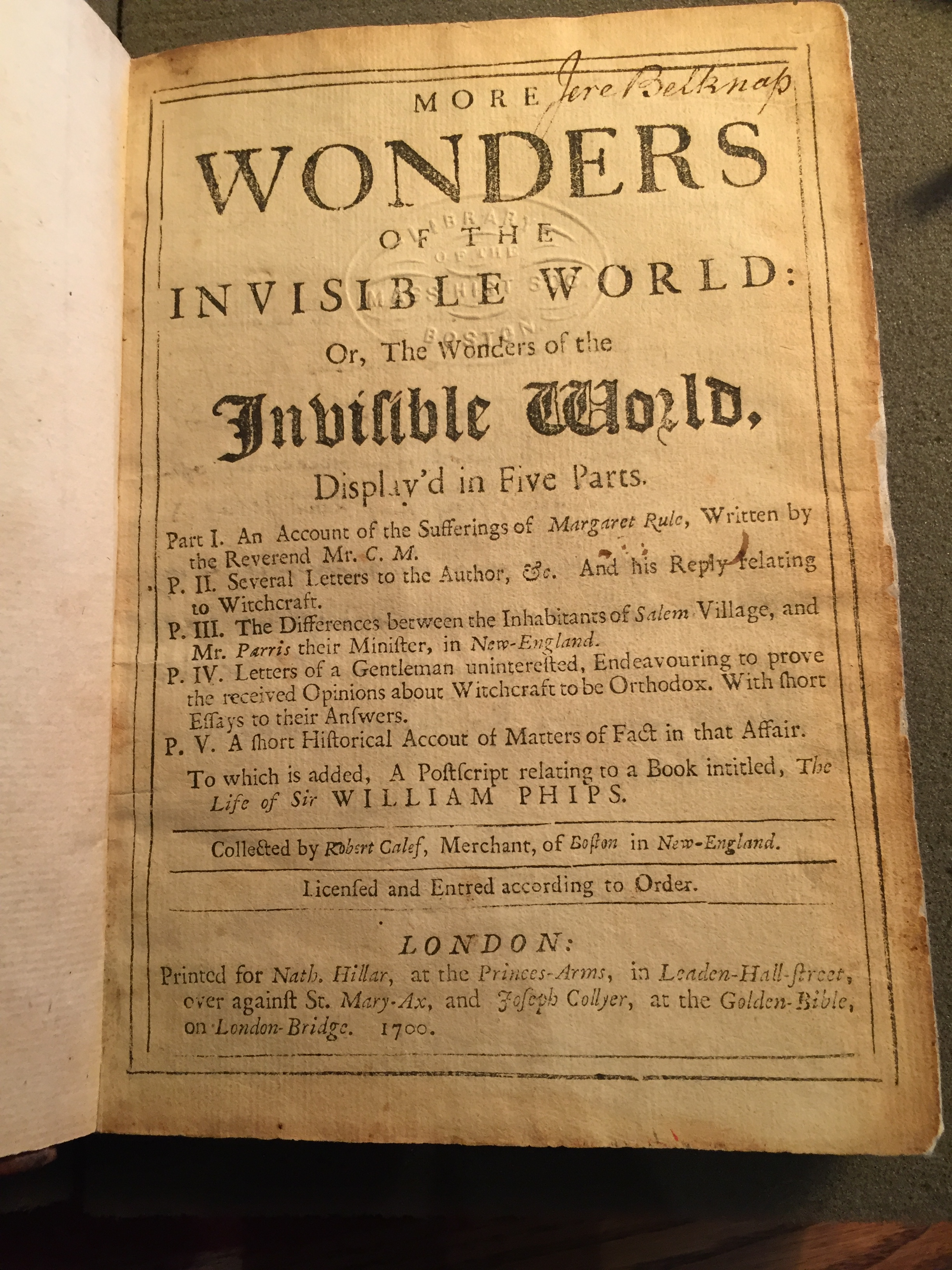
Calef's book, like Mather's before, printed at the Princes-Arms, in London

=== Printing in London and reception in New England ===
For his own book, Calef used the same printer employed by Cotton Mather for his anonymous 1697 Life of Phips, perhaps in an effort to reach the same audience. Cotton Mather records a date when Calef's manuscript shipped to London, June 10, 1698, as well as when bound copies returned in print, November 15, 1700. With William Stoughton, the former chief justice of the Court of Oyer and Terminer, and one of the staunchest supporters of the witch trials and executions, maintaining the most powerful office in the province, including control over the printing press, it is unlikely Calef attempted to have his book printed in Boston.

In early 1701, the Mathers responded with Some Few Remarks upon a Scandalous Book, written in the plural with co-signers, but occasionally lapsing into first person. The opening lines suggest that Calef's book had been well received by the masses in New England: "...that Scandalous Book ... has made our worthy Pastors Obnoxious ... among an unguided multitude". "It was highly rejoicing to us when we heard that our Booksellers were so well acquainted with the Integrity of our Pastors, as that not one of them could admit of any of those Libels to be vended in their shops."

Mather, unsurprisingly, refuses to directly address many particulars of Calef's book but, rather, accused Calef of being a follower of Satan, and uses select quotes from the Bible intended to put the merchant Calef in his place, including Exodus 22:28: "Thou Shalt Not Speak Evil of the Ruler of Thy People".

Within a year of the arrival of Calef's book, and not long after the death of William Stoughton, Increase Mather lost the Presidency of Harvard, to be replaced by Samuel Willard, and neither he nor his son Cotton Mather were able to regain the position despite numerous tries. According to Eliot, writing in 1809, Increase Mather, publicly burned the book in Harvard Yard.

=== Writing style ===
It is remarkable that Robert Calef, a tradesman, possessed a well-developed writing style and intellect that enabled him to frequently get the better of the highly educated Cotton Mather. An example of Calef's rationalism and biting wit are provided by his response to Another Brand Pluckt Out of the Burning, Cotton Mather's account of the possession of Margaret Rule. The first section of Mather's account is a long narrative about a proselytized Indian who was tempted into witchcraft by the devil and ultimately undone by his steadfast refusal to submit to the devil's temptations. Calef's terse response occurs in a postscript to one of his letters to Mather:

Postscript. —Sir, I here send you the copy of a paper that lately came to my hands; which, though it contains no wonders, yet is remarkable, and runs thus:
An account of what an Indian told Capt. Hill at Saco Fort.
The Indian told him, that the French ministers were better than the English; for before the French came among them there were a great many witches among the Indians; but now there were none; and there were witches among the English ministers, as Burroughs, who was hang'd for it.
Were I disposed to make reflections upon it, I suppose you will judge the field large enough; but I forbear.
As above, R. C.

== Legacy ==
=== 18th- and 19th-century views ===
In 1718, Francis Hutchinson, a minister in Bury St Edmunds (a town infamous for other trials and eleven miles from Calef's birthplace) wrote, An Historical Essay Concerning Witchcraft:

'' ... observe the time of the publications ... I know Mr. Cotton Mather, in his late Folio, imputes [the Salem witchcraft] to the Indian powwows, sending their Spirits amongst them; but I attribute it to Mr. Baxter's book, and his, and his father's, and the false principles, and frightful stories that filled the people's minds with great fears and dangerous notions."... "My author, for the greatest part, is Mr. Calef, a merchant in that plantation."

In 1768, historian Thomas Hutchinson (no relation to Francis Hutchinson but a close relative of the Mathers and born in Boston's north end) wrote extensively about the trials, and often relies on Calef's analysis and calls him a "fair relator." Thomas Jefferson owned a copy of Robert Calef's book in his library at Monticello. In 1796, less than ten years after the Constitutional Convention, Calef's book was re-printed. Writing in 1809, Massachusetts Historical Society (MHS) secretary John Eliot includes Calef as an entry in his Biographical Dictionary: "[Calef ] made himself famous by his book ... even the present generation read his book with mingled sentiments of pleasure and admiration." Another edition of Calef's book was brought out in 1823. In his History of Harvard University (1840), Harvard President Josiah Quincy writes of his predecessor, "That both the Mathers had an efficient agency in producing and prolonging that excitement, there can be, at this day, no possible question."

1867: CW Upham, a Salem minister, published an extensive two-volume history of the trials centered on Salem paying little mind to either Mather until near the end of his second volume (p 366) when his tone shifts into a sigh: "Of Cotton Mather, more is required to be said ... There is some ground for suspicion that he was instrumental in originating the fanaticism in Salem." Though Upham does not swerve to hit the Mathers, and his statement seems mild in comparison to those that had gone before, it garnered an agitated 67 page response from William Frederick Poole, a librarian at the Boston Athenaeum. WF Poole complains that "every school boy knows the story by heart" of Cotton Mather mounted on horseback at the execution of John Proctor and George Burroughs, as described by Calef. Poole cites various school textbooks: ("Calef, a citizen of Boston, exposed Mather's credulity, and greatly irritated the minister." — Lossing's Pictorial History of the United States, 1868, p. 106.) Poole also references poetry (Longfellow) and writes, "Calef's book, in our opinion, has a reputation much beyond its merits." "Salem Witchcraft and Cotton Mather" was Upham's book-length response to Poole (referring to him as "The Reviewer"). It was a devastating rebuttal and the consensus, at least at the time, seems to have been that Upham won the debate. (See below and notes in Burr. It may have hurt Poole's cause when he expressed a belief in the levitation of Margaret Rule. But note, the influence of WF Poole would return later, see 20th c. revision below.) This work by Upham is based on Robert Calef's book and draws from it, expanding some parts (see for instance, Upham textual treatment of "The Return of the Ministers"). Upham also closely inspects private correspondence and journals that didn't become available until after Calef's time, but corroborated Calef, including the diary of Samuel Sewall, the letters of Phips, and a letter from Cotton Mather to Stephen Sewall on September 20, 1692.

Materials that were unavailable or unknown to Upham, but would seem to support his view, and the work of Calef, include:

- I. the record-book of the Cambridge Association, which begins in 1690 with a discussion of issues Parris is facing in Salem village and includes important entries on June 27 and Aug. 1, 1692;
- II. Cotton Mather's private letters to a distant uncle John Cotton (banished from Boston to Plymouth) on August 5 ("Our Good God is working of miracles. Five witches were lately executed, impudently demanding of God, a miraculous vindication of their innocency.") and on October 20, 1692.
- III. Cotton Mather letter to Chief Justice William Stoughton on September 2, 1692 in which he congratulates him for "the extinguishing of as a wonderful a piece of devilism as has been seen in the world" and says that "one half of my efforts to serve you have not been told or seen." (The holograph of this letter did not arrive in the archives until about 1985, see link.)

1885: Harvard librarian JL Sibley took on the task of compiling biographies for Harvard graduates and in his entry on Cotton Mather (HU 1678), he presents a lengthy multi-page and even-handed summary of CM's debate with Calef. "The Mathers strove hard to put down Calef's book, and to crowd it into oblivion. ... But Calef's book is one of merit. Without it, our view of the proceedings of the Mathers and others in connection with the witchcraft delusion would have been very incomplete." This same year, GH Moore, superintendent of the Lenox Library, writes "no better authority can be found than Robert Calef's 'Matters of Fact' ... That Mr. Calef was one of the most useful men of his day and generation in Massachusetts is amply demonstrated by his book, which ... continues to this day the most valuable contemporary work on the Witchcraft Delusion. Its tone and temper contrast very creditably with those of his chief antagonist, Cotton Mather, whose fingers were grievously burned in attempting to handle Calef, whom he denounced, with unusual professional emphasis, as a 'Coale fetch'd from Hell.'" In a paper delivered to the American Antiquarian Society (AAS) in 1888, GH Moore writes, "Calef's letter to Willard (September 20, 1695) is one of the rough diamonds of his marvellous book ..."

1891: Harvard English Professor Barrett Wendell writes, "Calef's temper was that of the rational eighteenth century. The Mathers belonged rather to the sixteenth — the age of passionate religious enthusiasm ... Wherefore such of posterity as have not loved his memory have inclined now and again to call [Cotton Mather] by a name he would probably have been the first to use in their place — a very great liar." But, Wendell concludes, "... he meant to be honest."

=== 20th-century revision ===
==== from Apologism to Neo-credulism ====
In 1924, TJ Holmes, wrote that the critical view of Cotton Mather was based on the "insignificant" case of Margaret Rule and his contact over it with Calef. "Mather opponents tuned their fiddle to Calef's key." TJ Holmes was a librarian at the William G. Mather library and his writing followed after work by Harvard English professor GL Kittredge, beginning in 1907, which seems to wish to exonerate the Mathers and the New England region. (GL Burr draws this conclusion in a 1911 essay highly critical of Kittredge's 1907 essay.)

Kittredge writes: "The record of New England in the matter of witchcraft is highly creditable, when considered as a whole and from the comparative point of view." In this essay, Kittredge is dismissive of Calef's lengthy book, saying "Calef came too late to be really significant to our discussion." This statement is difficult to reconcile considering Calef's interactions began in September 1693, as noted by TJ Holmes, as well as Kittredge's praise for Francis Hutchinson, who relied on Calef (see year 1718, above). TJ Holmes went on to publish bibliographies on both Mathers often citing the work of Kittredge or Kittredge's younger mentee in the Harvard English department, Kenneth B. Murdock, whose father worked closely with Kittredge in running the Harvard press. TJ Holmes views seem to have eventually become more nuanced. In an essay from 1985, Harold Jantz writes "TJ Holmes at times deeply regretted having descended into this 'vast Mather bog' ... and he earnestly warned a very young man to stay clear of it."

The reflections by Jantz about TJ Holmes followed the discovery that a typescript copy of a September 2, 1692 letter from Cotton Mather to Chief Justice William Stoughton was authentic, and the heretofore missing "holograph" had been located and placed in the archives The September 2, 1692 letter strongly supports Robert Calef's view of Cotton Mather. Jantz had previously (in the same essay) dismissed this letter as a "nasty, psychopathological" forgery and in this view he seems to have perhaps been joined by other neo-credulous scholars of the mid 20th century, including K. Silverman, Chadwick Hansen (see below) and D. Levin. Jantz's essay, with his mistake frozen in time, could offer a clear window into the zeitgeist. Kenneth Silverman's biography of Cotton Mather, published in 1984, the year before this discovery, won Pulitzer and Bancroft awards.

Writing in 1953, Perry Miller quotes SE Morison as saying "Robert Calef tied a tin can to Cotton Mather which has rattled and banged through the pages of superficial and popular historians ... My account is not popular and I strive to make it not superficial", and if qualified to the terms of his thesis, "the right can was tied to the proper tail, and through the pages of this volume it shall rattle and bang", Miller posits.

==== Mather Hysteria-graphy ====
"I use the female pronoun here because in Western Civilization the overwhelming majority of witchcraft victims have been women, who are more subject to hysteria than men." Chadwick Hansen, 1972

Calef is mentioned and discussed in a book called Cayce and Reincarnation, first published in the 1960s. It is based on the famed 20th century psychic Edgar Cayce and his sessions with people on past life regression therapy. The book discusses Calef and his being a good person at a bad time in Salem. In 1969, Chadwick Hansen claimed Calef was guilty of libel and in 1972 expanded this to "the outrageous lie, 'the Big Lie' in Goebbels' phrase.'" Calef had been cleared of the charge of libel in 1693 when neither Mather showed up in court. Hansen writes, "I realize that in calling Calef a liar I differ from virtually every other person who has written about him since his own time." Hansen seems to base his accusations on the slim but charged portion of Calef's book making up the accounts of September 13 and 19, 1693. These events launched the interaction between Calef and Mather, but Calef relied on eyewitnesses and was not present on either occasion, as both Mather and Calef agree.

A key part of Chadwick Hansen's analysis appears to be based on his misunderstanding of the archaic or less commonly used word "bed-clothes" which Oxford English Dictionary defines as "sheets and blankets" with examples from period literature. Thus Hansen misunderstands the distinction Calef makes between "bed-clothes" and "clothes".

Other 20th-century historians were also keen to focus on this and followed Hansen in his mistake, including David Levin, who in 1978, referred to "the girls [sic] bare breast" and, in 1985, writes, "Even if we reject Robert Calef's libelous claim that he saw both Mathers fumbling under the young woman's bedclothes in search of demons (and the pleasure of fondling her breast and belly) and even if we reject the tradition that President Increase Mather had Calef's book burned in Harvard College Yard, we should hesitate to portray Increase Mather as the voice of unqualified reason and charity." Kenneth Silverman also echos Hansen's mistake, writing "Calef's account clearly implies that Rule was partly naked." Portions of Hansen's book rely on the trial records compiled by Calef in Part 5 of his book.

== Publications ==
- More Wonders of the Invisible World, Parts I–IV SG Drake 1866 reprint of Calef carefully following the original edition. Unlike GL Burr's popular reprint from 1914, this one is unabridged, but for second half of Calef's book, see next link.
- More Wonders of the Invisible World, Part V and Postscript SG Drake 1866 second half of Calef's book, including most of the trial records.
- More Wonders of the Invisible World SP Fowler reprint 1865. It has some altered formatting and is not as true to the original as Drake, but in one volume.
- More Wonders of the Invisible World The 1823 reprint, also having some altered formatting.
- More Wonders of the Invisible World An original 1700 edition, from the archives.
