= Booty Bounce (disambiguation) =

"Booty Bounce" is a 2016 song by Tujamo and Taio Cruz.

Booty Bounce may also refer to:

- "Booty Bounce", a 2010 song by Dev, sampled by Far East Movement in "Like a G6"
- Booty bounce, a slang for twerking
