= Booty Call =

Booty call is a slang term for a request for casual sex.

Booty Call may also refer to:

- Booty Call (film), a 1997 American comedy film
  - Booty Call (soundtrack), the film's 1997 soundtrack
- Booty Call (EP), by the Midnight Beast, 2010
- "Booty Call", a track by the Kid Laroi from F*ck Love, 2020
- "Booty Call", a song by Brokencycle from I'm Not a Fan, but the Kids Like It!

== Other uses ==
- "Booti Call", a 1994 song by Blackstreet
- "Bootie Call", a 1998 song by All Saints
- Jake's Booty Call, a series of Flash animation games and the 2003 movie based on the series

== See also ==
- Pocket dialing or "butt dialing", a type of accidental phone call
- Bootie (disambiguation)
- Booty (disambiguation)
- Mating call (disambiguation)
