= Mating call (disambiguation) =

A mating call is an auditory signal used by animals.

Mating call may also refer to:

- Mating Call, 1958 album by Tadd Dameron and John Coltrane, or the title track
- Mating Call (Roberto Magris album), 2010 jazz album by Roberto Magris
- The Mating Call, 1928 silent film about a soldier returning from WWI

== See also ==
- Tainted Love: Mating Calls and Fight Songs (album) 2007 album by Shivaree
- Mating (disambiguation)
- Call (disambiguation)
- Booty Call (disambiguation)
- Sexual reproduction
- Sexual intercourse
- Courtship
