= Letter from Cotton Mather to William Stoughton, September 2, 1692 =

Regarding Salem witch executions

Coordinates: 42.518°N 70.909°W

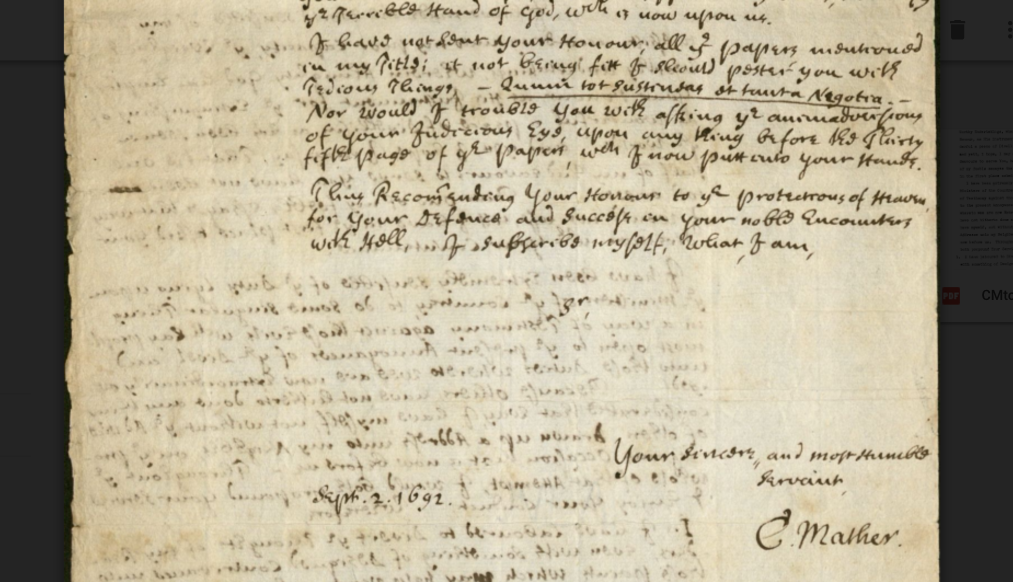
Cotton Mather's date and signature on September 2, 1692 letter now held by Boston College

Cotton Mather wrote a letter to judge William Stoughton dated September 2, 1692. Among the notable things about this letter is the provenance: it seems to be the last important correspondence from Mather to surface in the modern era, with the holograph manuscript not arriving in the archives for scholars to view, and authenticate, until sometime between 1978 and 1985.

== Context and content ==
On August 19, 1692, five accused individuals had been executed in Salem, Massachusetts, bringing the total to eleven (reaching twenty by the end of September). Mather had attended this execution and one account shows him giving a speech on horseback that seemed to quiet a crowd that had been calling for mercy for the accused.

Cotton Mather begins the September 2 letter by writing that he has "made the world sensible of my zeal to assist... your honour...[in the] extinguishing of as wonderful a piece of devilism as has been seen in the world; and yet... one half of my endeavors to serve you have not been told or seen." Further alluding to the care and subterfuge he employs in his presentation, he writes, "I have laboured to divert the thoughts of my readers, even with something of a designed contrivance..." He asks for Stoughton's permission and approbation in writing on the specifics of the current trials. This suggests Mather's later claim that his book was "commanded" by colonial Governor William Phips may have been an inversion of the truth, as Phips letter on October 10, 1692, says he "put a stop to the printing of any discourses one way or other".

Accompanying his letter on September 2, Mather sends a lengthy portion of the book he has already written, telling Stoughton to feel free to skip the first 34 pages. Yet he says he has "not included all the papers mentioned in my title". Against this backdrop, and the "swelling public outcry" of August, Stacy Schiff concludes that Mather's book must be viewed as "a propaganda piece" departing from a common late twentieth-century view of the book as a "defense" of the trials.

Stoughton responded enthusiastically to the September 2 letter, and his personal endorsement of the forthcoming Wonders is reprinted in the preface (p. vi-vii). Stoughton's response specifically recommends that the book be committed "unto the PRESS". Stoughton may have aided Mather in circumventing Phips and in the book's preface Mather credits Stoughton for giving him a "shield" to ship the book "abroad" to England where it arrived by the end of December and was hastily printed and published.

...the Lieutenant-Governor of New England having perused it, has done me the honor of giving me a Shield, under the umbrage whereof I now dare to walk Abroad. (Wonders preface p. vi.)

But a major goal of Mather, as expressed in the September 2 letter, was quickly obtaining copies of the official trial records, and in this he seems to have been further stalled, as can be seen in his letter to the trial clerk Stephen Sewall on September 20, 1692. Mather probably did not receive these records until September 22, 1692 when Stephen Sewall traveled to Boston for a meeting at his brother's house with Mather and Stoughton.

== 1985: A notable year in the Mather historiography ==
There are some indications that the arrival of the holograph of this letter in the archives may have come as an unwelcome surprise to some twentieth-century scholars of the colonial period. David Levin points out that the letter demonstrates the timeline used by both "Thomas J. Holmes and Perry Miller" is off by "three weeks." Writing in the same year as Levin, 1985, Harold Jantz had submitted an essay describing various frauds and fakes and he included the AAS typescript copy of what he calls the "Stoughton letter" (September 2, 1692) calling it a "nasty, pathological" forgery "intended to make Cotton Mather put his worst foot forward in connection with the witchcraft trials." But in an addendum to the essay, Jantz writes that just before publication "barely in time for this added note, new information reached me about the letter... at present the manuscript is firmly labeled as 'original' and 'holograph'" Yet as Jantz continues the essay, he still seems to harbor suspicions, referring to the letter's "author" instead of Mather. "What if it should turn out that the Stoughton letter cannot be proved to be a forgery?" Jantz writes. "This would make it doubly fascinating, doubly perplexing." And "would require that we rewrite Cotton Mather's biography as two Cotton Mather's biographies."

The same year as the Jantz essay, 1985, Kenneth Silverman had been awarded a Pulitzer and a Bancroft Prize for a biography of Mather published the year before, 1984. Unlike Jantz, Silverman's introduction to the September 2, 1692 letter in his book of Mather correspondence (1971) does not directly dispute the authenticity of the letter beyond saying the holograph could not be located, but his basic assessment of Mather ("he did not want to defend [the trials]") suggests that Silverman, like TJ Holmes, Perry Miller, Jantz (and also perhaps Levin, who published a biography of Mather in 1978), did not previously believe the typescript copy of the letter was authentic and this would have affected work conducted prior to the knowledge of the holograph in 1985.

Also published in 1985, and written presumably before the holograph of the letter reached the archives, David D. Hall strikes a triumphant note for the revision led by GL Kittredge at Harvard. "With him one great phase of interpretation came to a dead end." Hall writes that whether the old interpretation favored by "antiquarians" had begun with the "malice of Robert Calef or deep hostility to Puritanism," either way "such notions are no longer... the concern of the historian." But David Hall notes "one minor exception. Debate continues on the attitude and role of Cotton Mather... though none of his recent biographers is at all interested in making him responsible for Salem..." Hall mentions both Levin and Silverman. In 1991, Hall published "Witch-hunting in Seventeenth-Century New England: A Documentary History." Hall does not publish or mention the recently controversial Sept. 2 letter and in a footnote Hall writes, "The circumstances under which Mather composed Wonders... are admirably sketched by Thomas J. Holmes..."

== Provenance of the Mather letter and typescript copy ==
Associated with the holograph in the Burns Library is a faint one-page typescript leaflet, dated April 7, 1943. The leaflet is a description of three Mather A.L.S. (Autograph Letter Signed) being offered for sale. The leaflet begins:

These three Cotton Mather A.L.S. are addressed to William Stoughton who presided at the Trials of the Witches in Salem and these letters pertain entirely to Witchcraft. Being written to William Stoughton, they are of the greatest importance. According to Mr. Brigham of the American Antiquarian Society, there is a similar letter, same as the longest one here, written to John Richards which is an exact copy of this letter. The reason Mr. Brigham is sure that the Richards letter is a copy is because it is on 2 1/2 pages whereas the enclosed is 4 pages.

The leaflet concludes:

Mr. Brigham offered me $500 for this which means that it is worth from $1000 to $1500 for he is a good buyer and very conservative in price. He considers this one of the best finds in A.L.S. in years.

Of the three A. L. S. being offered, the letter to John Richards dated May 31, 1692, is the primary one discussed in the leaflet. This letter was previously known via a copy ascribed to Mather but not written in Mather's hand. A second A.L.S., the "Return of Several Ministers" is mentioned only in passing. The third A.L.S., the letter of September 2, 1692, and subject of this article, is not mentioned explicitly at all. Although this letter is of extremely high research value, the seller apparently did not think its value to collectors would be as great as the other two well-known documents. The leaflet also mentions showing the three A.L.S. to Mr. Brigham of the American Antiquarian Society, offering a clue as to the origin and date of the Society's typescript copy of the Sept 2, 1692 letter.

== Establishing the authenticity of the holograph ==
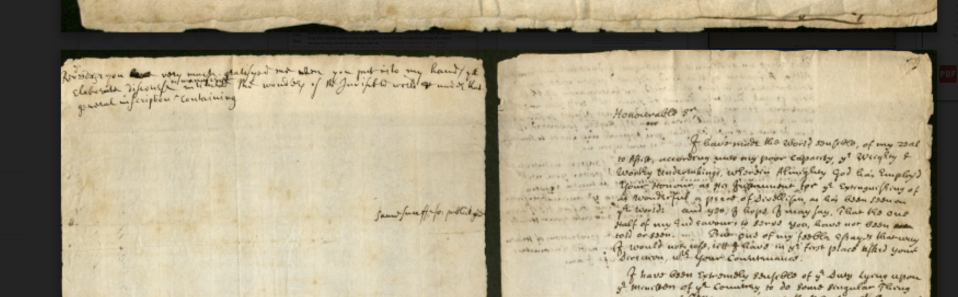
Stoughton's handwriting upper left, Mather's salutation on the right

According to Jantz, the original manuscript of the letter was sold by the widow of the collector who once owned it to the Boston College and David Levin had reaffirmed the authenticity and "double checked with some of the experts who had verified Mather's handwriting at the time of acquisition..." and found the paper "of the right age." Neither Jantz nor Levin seem to have noted that the letter could be further verified by a line of handwriting by Stoughton (the AAS typescript also contains this line at the end, copied with a pen) a paraphrased version of this opening line was reprinted by Mather in his book some weeks later. Stacy Schiff, writing thirty years after Jantz and Levin, seems to be the first person on record to take notice of this fact, "Stoughton began his fulsome reply on the verso."

Schiff also might be the first scholar, following Jantz and Levin, to note the location of the holograph at the John J. Burns Library of Rare Books and Special Collections at Boston College.

== Recent notice of the letter ==
Between 1985 and 2015, there appears to have been little notice of what Jantz called the "doubly fascinating, doubly perplexing" letter, or its location and availability for scholarship in the archives, including the interest that coincided with the tercentenary of the trials in 1992.

Writing in 2002, Mary Beth Norton seems to accept the Sept. 2 letter's authenticity and quotes some milder passages, citing the reprint in Silverman (1971). It is unclear whether Norton was aware of the controversy around the letter expressed in 1985. In the citation, Norton does not address the Kittredge-Holmes-Miller lineage, which David D. Hall had praised in early 1985, but Norton distances her work from chapter 13 of Perry Miller's 1953 book (Miller cites TJ Holmes for this chapter). Miller's book, she writes, contains "an interpretation of Mather's work on Wonders that differs considerably from mine."

Clive Holmes in a 2016 essay underscores the importance of the content of the September 2 letter and makes note of the typescript at AAS (but not the holograph at Boston College) and suggests Silverman's abridgment of the letter in 1971 was overly severe. If Silverman was working within a lineage that distrusted the authenticity of the AAS typescript, as the 1985 essays by Jantz and Levin suggest, it would be understandable why his reprint of the letter in 1971 was truncated.

Digital copies of the letter are now available via email from both the AAS (original typescript) and Boston College (holograph).
