= Francis Hutchinson =

British minister

Francis Hutchinson (2 January 1660 – 1739) was a British minister in Bury St Edmunds when he wrote a famous book debunking witchcraft prosecutions and subsequently was made Bishop of Down and Connor in Ireland.

== Education ==
Hutchinson was born in Carsington, Wirksworth, Derbyshire, the second son of Mary and Edward Hutchinson or Hitchinson (a family of the lesser landed gentry). He was taught history by his uncle, Francis Tallents, a Puritan clergyman, before beginning his studies at Katharine Hall, Cambridge in 1678. Hutchinson graduated B.A. in 1681 and M.A. in 1684,a year after he was ordained by the bishop of London and was appointed Lecturer at the rectory of Widdington, Essex. This living represented the lowest rung of the career ladder of the Church of England and Hutchinson remained there until appointed vicar of Hoxne, Suffolk in early 1690 by local Whig magnate, William Maynard. Hutchinson received a D.D. from Cambridge in 1698.

== Bury St Edmunds and An Historical Essay Concerning Witchcraft ==
Sometime before 1692, Hutchinson became a minister and perpetual curate at St. James parish in Bury St Edmunds and this may have led to an interest in researching the infamous trials that had occurred there. In 1700, a skeptical book about the 1692 Salem witch trials by Robert Calef was printed in London and in his own book Hutchinson praises and recommends Calef's work, providing the name of the bookseller in London. Calef had immigrated to Boston from the town of Stanstead, only eleven miles south of Bury. By 1706, Hutchinson was passing around a draft of a book that would come to be called An Historical Essay Concerning Witchcraft but was discouraged by influential friends from publishing. In 1712, Hutchinson experienced the local trial of Jane Wenham firsthand and again considered publishing, but again demurred. "Writing about witchcraft is a tricky business," as Ian Bostridge notes regarding Hutchinson's process. A few years later a book by Richard Boulton appeared which Hutchinson detested, and this seems to have finally galled him into publishing his book in 1718. It was a lengthy work carefully and patiently deconstructing and dissecting witch-hunting and the witchcraft prosecutions in East Anglia and other parts of England, as well as New England, and "applied a consciously rational approach to the phenomenon." Historian Wallace Notestein, writing in 1911, ends a similar survey in 1718 "because that year marked the publication of Francis Hutchinson's notable attack." Notestein calls it "epoch-making" and writes, "Hutchinson levelled a final and deadly blow at the dying superstition."Ian Bostridge suggests Hutchinson's delays in publishing the work "indicates how contentious the subject was, within the elite circles in which Hutchinson moved." Bostridge does not diminish the importance of Hutchinson's book, but presents the vote to repeal of the Witchcraft Act in 1735 as a politically complex event and not a foregone conclusion.

== Ireland ==
In early 1721, Hutchinson was consecrated bishop of Down and Conner and took up residence in Lisburn, in modern-day Northern Ireland. He died in 1739, aged 79, and was buried in Portglenone Parish Church, County Antrim.

== Works ==
- An Historical Essay Concerning Witchcraft (1718) and a subsequent edition (1720).

Note that while the second edition has a larger type, generous spacing, an illustration, and advertisements, it seems to add no more content from Hutchinson, but omits one essay from the 1718 edition ("A Defence of the Compassionate Address to Papists").
