= Booty Bounce =

Single by Tujamo and Taio Cruz
- Released: 1 February 2016
- Length: 3:16
- Label: Spinnin'
- Songwriter(s): Matthias Richter
- Producer(s): Taio Cruz; Matthias Richter

Tujamo singles chronology
"Cream" (2015)	"Booty Bounce" (2016)

Taio Cruz singles chronology
"Do What You Like" (2015)	"Booty Bounce" (2016)	"Row the Body" (2017)

"Booty Bounce" is a song by German electro-house music producer Tujamo, which was later remixed with additional vocals from British singer Taio Cruz. The song was released as a digital download in Germany on 1 February 2016 by Spinnin' Records. The song has charted in Germany and the Netherlands.

== Track listing ==
Digital download
No.	Title	Length
1.	"Booty Bounce" (Radio Edit)	3:15
2.	"Booty Bounce" (Extended Mix)	4:01
3.	"Booty Bounce" (Instrumental Radio Edit)	3:19
4.	"Booty Bounce" (Instrumental Extended Mix)	4:16

== Chart performance ==
=== Weekly charts ===
Chart (2016)	Peak position
Belgium (Ultratip Bubbling Under Flanders)	51
Belgium (Ultratop Dance Bubbling Under Flanders)	2
Belgium (Ultratop Dance Bubbling Under Wallonia)	5
France (SNEP)	118
Chart (2016)	Peak position
Remix with Taio Cruz
Belgium Dance (Ultratop Flanders)	40
Belgium (Ultratip Bubbling Under Wallonia)	19
Belgium (Ultratop Dance Wallonia)	18
Germany (Official German Charts)	83
Netherlands (Single Top 100)	77
Netherlands Dance (Dance Top 30)	19

== Release history ==
Region	Date	Format	Label
Germany	1 February 2016	Digital download	Spinnin'
