= Turen går til =

Turen går til is a travel guide series published by Politikens Forlag in Copenhagen, Denmark. The meaning of the Danish title is “The trip goes to”. The series is the largest travel guide series in Scandinavia and covers more than 200 destinations around the world. The books are either about countries, regions, or cities. They contain information about the destinations’ history and culture, their attractions, and practical information such as lists of restaurants and hotels, and useful phrases in the local language.

The series started in 1952 with a guidebook to Austria followed in 1953 by guidebooks to France and Italy. By 1958, the series included books on England, Germany, Switzerland, and Spain, as well as on London, Paris, and Rome. The books were published in Danish by Politikens Forlag, in Swedish by Gebers Förlag AB, and in Norwegian by Chr. Skibsteds Forlag. A limited number of guidebooks were also translated to German and sold as Polyglott Reiseführer. By 1962, the travel guides series had sold 373,000 copies.

== See also ==
- Bechmann Pedersen, Sune; Hansen, Henning (2023). "Midlife media history: Turen går til and tourist guidebooks in the era of mass travel". In Bechmann Pedersen, Sune; Cronqvist, Marie; Holgersson, Ulrika (eds.). Expanding media histories: Cultural and material perspectives. Nordic Academic Press. pp. 197–220. doi:10.21525/kriterium.50.h. ISBN 9789189361676.
