= Paint the White House Black =

Single by George Clinton

from the album Hey, Man, Smell My Finger
- Released: October 1993
- Genre: Funk; hip-hop; R&B; dance
- Label: Paisley Park; Warner Bros.
- Songwriters: Barrett Strong; George Clinton; Kerry Gordy; Norman Whitfield; William Bryant III
- Producer: George Clinton

George Clinton singles chronology
| "Tweakin'" (1989) | "Paint the White House Black" (1993) | "Martial Law" (1993) |

"Paint the White House Black" is a song by American singer and songwriter George Clinton, released in October 1993 by Paisley Park and Warner Records as the first single from his sixth studio album, Hey, Man, Smell My Finger (1993). The song features the musical artists Chuck D, Public Enemy, Ice Cube, Dr. Dre, Yo-Yo, MC Breed, Kam and Shock G. It peaked at number 75 on the US Cash Box Top 100 and number 25 on the Billboard Maxi-Singles Sales chart.

== Critical reception ==
Rolling Stone wrote, "The words paint the White House black recently appeared in MC Breed's pounding 'Ain't No Future in Yo' Frontin', and with Breed rapping on Clinton's 'Paint the White House Black', the song's concept (defiance, mostly) feels multigenerational and even possible."

Select magazine said, "'Paint the White House Black' adds novelty value otherwise absent from a rather tired selection of seismic beats and silly voices."

Yahoo Music called Clinton's "Paint the White House Black" "one of his best political jabs in years".

== Charts ==
| Chart (1993) | Peak position |
|---|---|
| US Maxi-Singles Sales (Billboard) | 25 |
| US Cash Box Top 100 | 75 |
