= William Griggs (physician) =

Doctor during the Salem witch trials

William Griggs was a medical doctor in Salem Village, Massachusetts. He is best known as the doctor who diagnosed the Salem Villagers as possessed, during the time of the Salem witch trials. Griggs was in charge of diagnosing and determining how "much" of a witch they were. Griggs claimed that the "afflicted" girls were "under an Evil hand" (most likely referring to the Devil).
