= Booty v Barnaby =

17th Century Court Case in England

- Court: Court of King's Bench
- Decided: 1687

Court membership
- Judge sitting: Herbert CJ

Keywords
- Apparitional experience, Slander

Booty v. Barnaby is the name of an English court case in 1687, in which an individual known as Mrs. Booty brought a suit for slander against her neighbour, Captain Barnaby, who claimed that he had seen her deceased husband being driven into Hell.

== Events ==
On May 12, 1687, Captains Barnaby, Bristow and Brewer with Mr Ball, a merchant of Wentworth, went to go shooting on Stromboli, (Note: Later reports mention the island as Lessaria and another called Shumbalon.) aboard the Spinks. Later, as they prepared to leave on the 15th, they saw two men running and Capt Barnaby cried out, "Lord bless me! the foremost man is Mr Booty my next door neighbour in London." He was in grey clothes with cloth buttons, and the man who was chasing him was dressed in black. They both ran into the mouth of the volcano and at instant there came a great noise. Capt Barnaby said "I do not doubt, but it is old Booty running into hell."

They arrived at Gravesend on October 6. After some discourse, Capt Barnaby's wife said "I can tell you some news, old Booty is dead." He answered, "that we all know: we all saw him run into hell." Mrs Barnaby related this to an acquaintance in London, who informed Mrs Booty of it. Mrs Booty was very much displeased and went to court about it. The Judge asked Mrs Booty what time her husband died. She told them and it agreed with the time in which the Captain and his crew saw him running.

Lord have mercy upon me, and grant I may never see what you have seen; one, two or three may be mistaken, but thirty never can be mistaken.

— Herbert CJ

She lost her suit, based on the statements of thirty witnesses who were there and their journals.

== Distortions ==
Some later versions have Booty as a baker, or as a receiver.

The Idler published two illustrations concerning Mr. Booty by George Cruikshank in 1837.

A poem titled "Old booty! : A serio-comic sailor's tale." was published in 1830 by William Thomas Moncrieff.

== Case details ==
In the records at Westminster, Court of King's Bench, Reign of James the Second, 1687

- Sir Edward Herbert - Chief Justice
- Wythens, Holloway and Wright, Justices
- Defendant - Captain Barnaby
- Complainant - Mrs. Booty

== Resources ==
- Kirby, R. S. (1820). "REMARKABLE TRIAL". Kirby's wonderful and eccentric museum; or, Magazine of remarkable characters. Including all the curiosities of nature and art, from the remotest period to the present time, drawn from every authentic source. Illustrated with one hundred and twenty-four engravings. Chiefly taken from rare and curious prints or original drawings. Vol. 2. London. pp. 247–249.
