= Die Türen =

German pop band

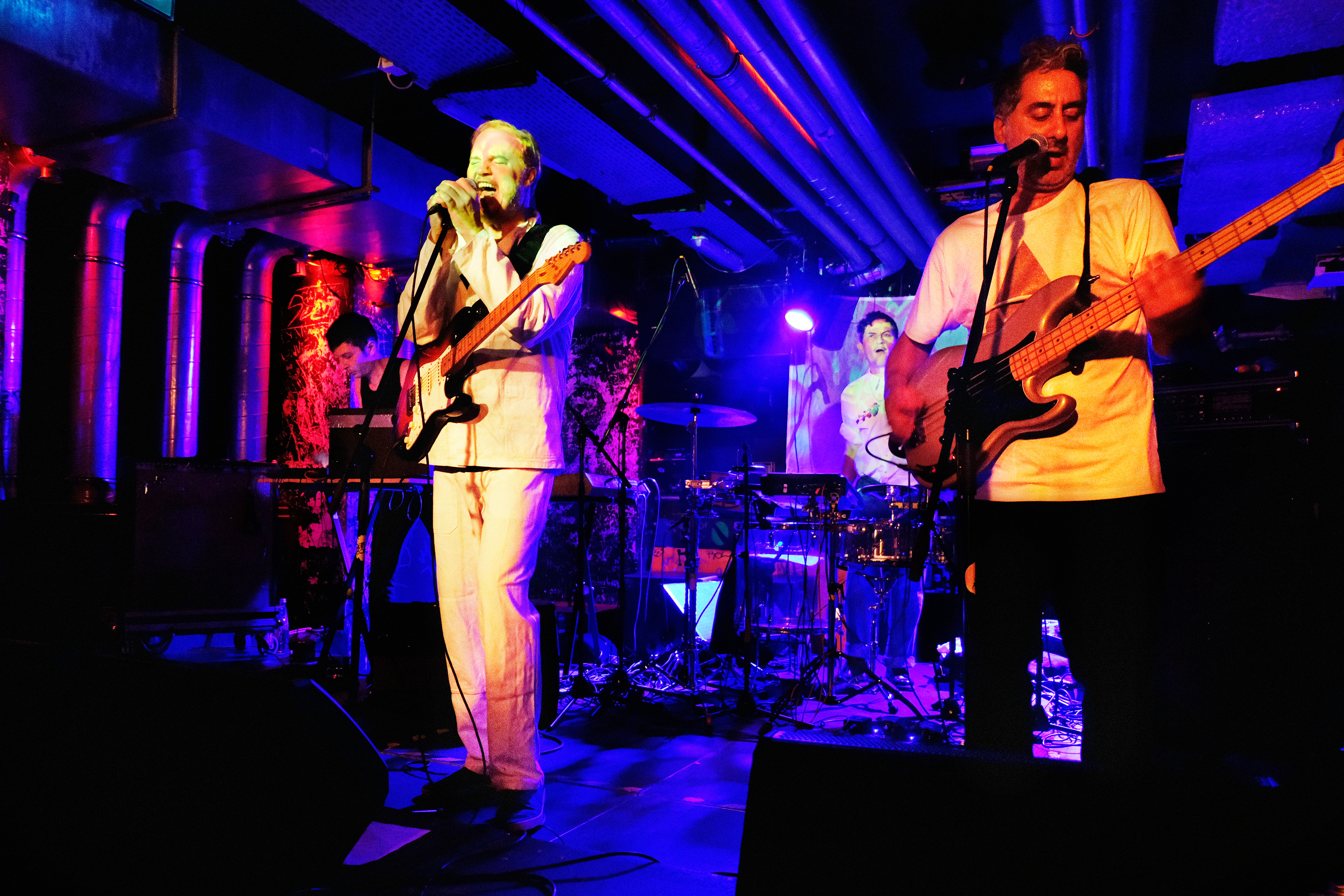
Die Türen playing a gig in Munich (2019)

Die Türen ("the doors") are a Berlin-based German pop band founded in 2002. The band's lyrics are noted for offbeat laconic humour.

== Discography ==
- 2004: Das Herz war Nihilismus
- 2005: Unterwegs mit Mother Earth
- 2007: Popo
- 2008: Booty
- 2012: ABCDEFGHIJKLMNOPQRSTUVWXYZ
- 2012: Das Cover Album
- 2014: Wir sind der Mann (as Der Mann)
- 2015: Ich bin ein Mann
- 2016: Der Spielmacher
- 2019: Exoterik
