= Cambridge Association =

Congregational clergy group in 17th century Massachusetts

Coordinates: 42.518°N 70.909°W

The Cambridge Association was an influential group of Congregational clergymen in the Boston area who regularly met in the Harvard College library between 1690 and 1697. The minutes of their meetings shed important light on the oft-debated question of the Puritan ministers influence on the witchcraft trials.

== Membership ==
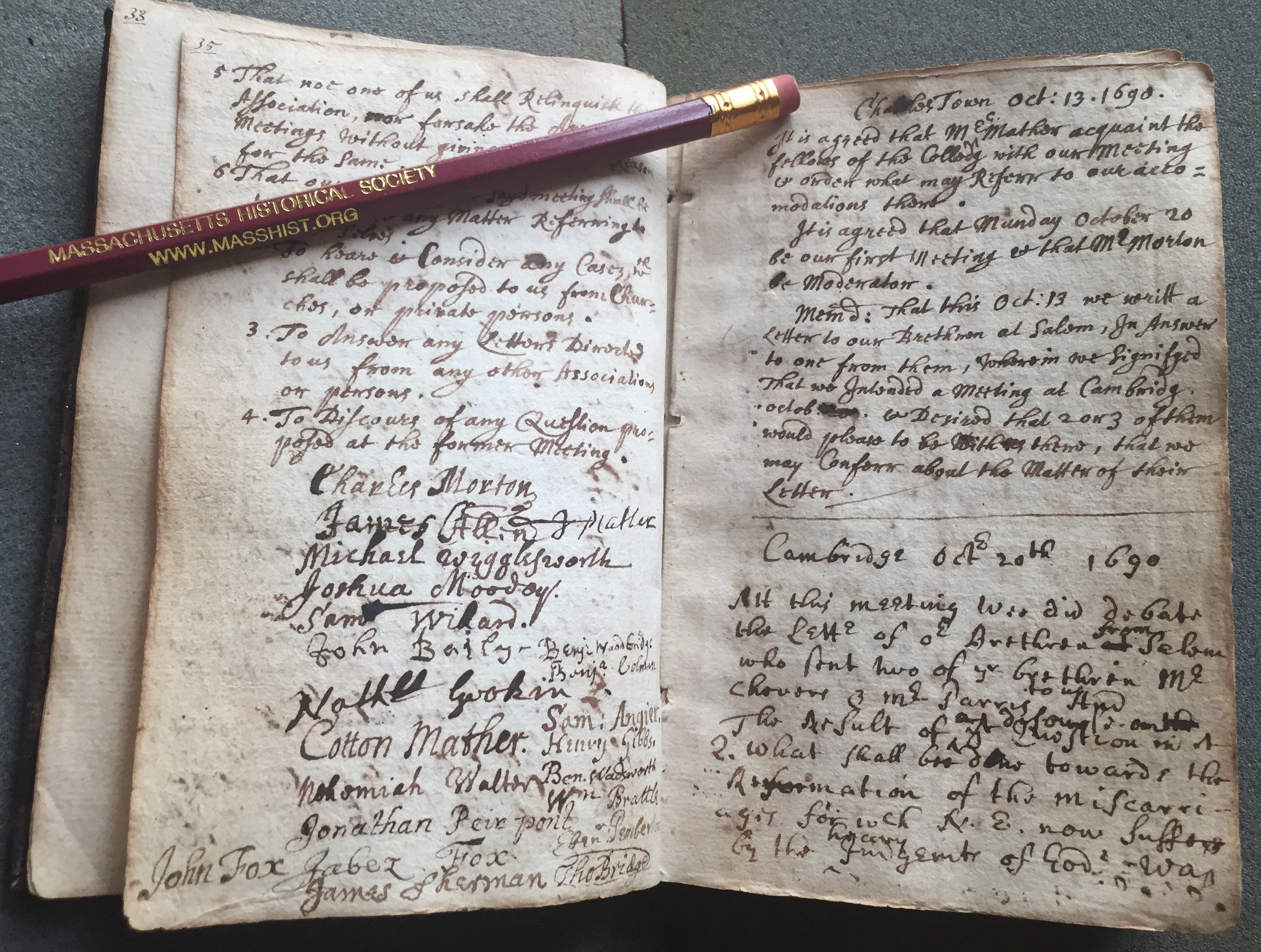
When they joined, ministers signed the book.

The record-book suggests Charles Morton and Cotton Mather were the two important founding members of the group. Together with the bylaws, the two men's names give the appearance of sharing the same ink, and at the first (or second) organizational pre-meeting, on October 13, 1690, Cotton Mather is listed as the one who will tell Harvard that the group will have their first official meeting in the library a week later, on October 20. Charles Morton was the most senior and placed his name at the top and Cotton Mather signed lower, perhaps leaving space in between for other designated members to sign in order of seniority, including James Allen (Boston First Church), Michael Wigglesworth (HU 1651), Joshua Moodey (H.U. 1653), Samuel Willard (HU 1659, Boston South Church), John Bailey, and Nathaniel Gookin (HU 1675, d. Aug 15, 1692). Four of these men -- Morton, Allen, Moodey, and Willard-- had also signed an introduction to Cotton Mather's book Memorable Providences the year before in 1689.

Increase Mather did not return from London until May, 1692, and likely signed the book, next to James Allen's name, soon after his return and he is first listed as definitely present on June 27, 1692. Nehemiah Walter (HU 1684) was Increase Mather's son-in-law and doesn't seem to have been present until around the time Increase Mather joined. Jonathan Pierpont (HU 1685) is also first noted as present on August 1, 1692.

Others joined later, sometimes years later, and they seem to have eventually begun to sign the designated page of the book in a jumbled order, where space permitted, including: Jabez Fox and John Fox, James Sherman, Benjamin Woodbridge, Benjamin Wadsworth (H.U. 1690 and future President), Benjamin Colman (HU 1692), William Brattle (HU 1680), Ebenezer Pemberton (HU 1691), Samuel Angier (HU 1673), John Fox, Henry Gibbs, and Thomas Bridge. Although some these men worked at Harvard as tutors, fellows, and library-keepers, and thus may have been present in some capacity at meetings in the library, it is unlikely any joined officially before being ordained as a minister.

== Advising Salem ==
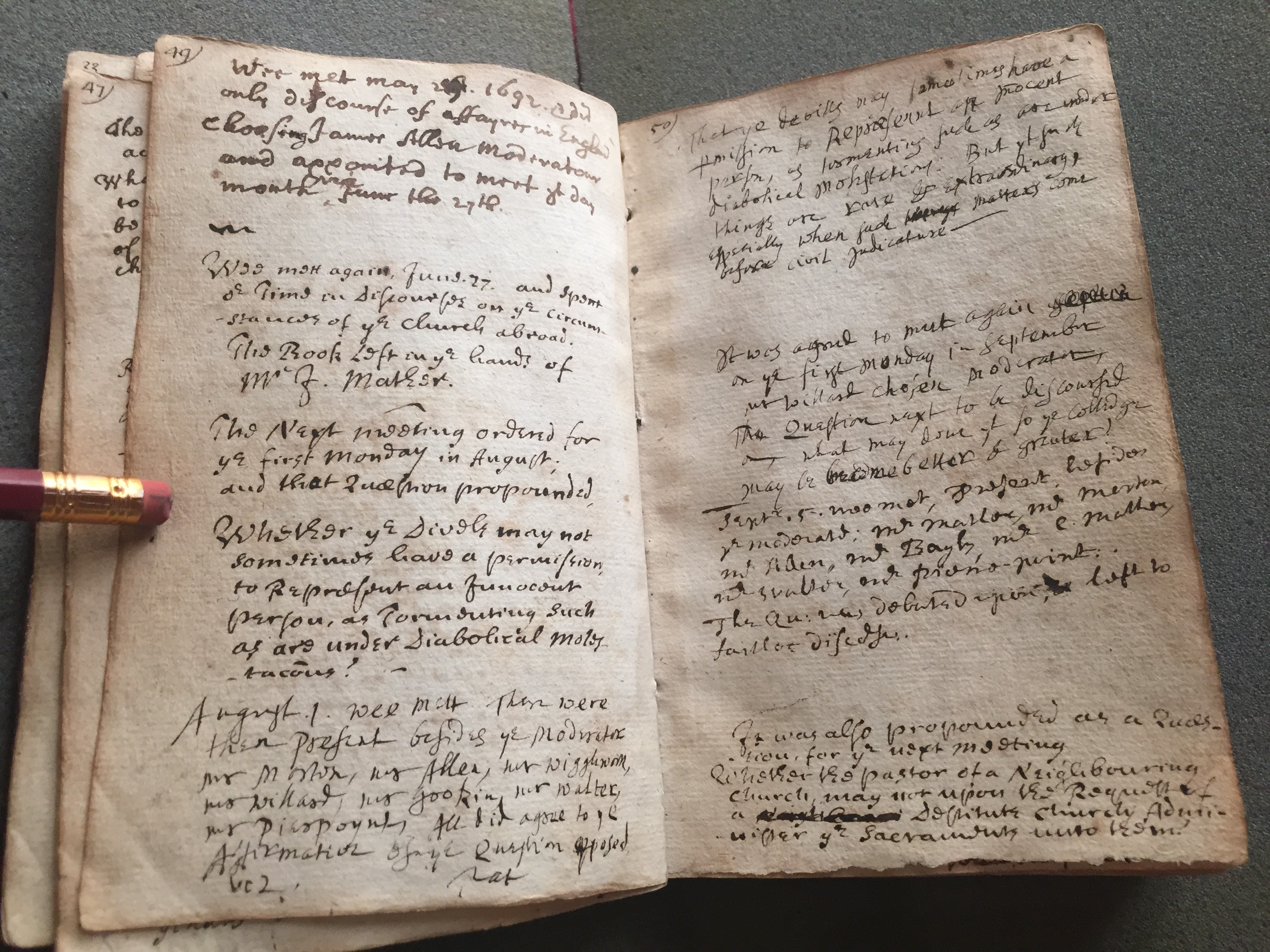
Advice regarding Salem in 1692

One of the first orders of business taken up by the new group of ministers was to discuss a letter from Rev. Samuel Parris in Salem Village concerning his troubles there. Parris visited the Harvard Library for another meeting scheduled only one week later on October 20, 1690.

On June 27 1692, during the height of the witchcraft trials, Cotton Mather scribed the question for the group to ponder and discuss at their next meeting in early August. The question proposed was chosen by his father, Increase Mather: "Whether the devils may not sometimes have permission to represent an innocent person as tormenting such as are under diabolical molestations?" In other words, the Mathers are contemplating whether it is possible for someone accused of witchcraft to be innocent, a position that is nearly the opposite of presumed innocence. The question was discussed at the next meeting August 1, and in Increase Mather's handwriting the conclusion was recorded, "All did agree to the affirmative... [that false accusations can happen]... but that such things are rare and extraordinary especially when such matters come before civil judicature." Numerous executions of accused persons followed this go-ahead to the court.

In 1694, when apologizing to his congregation, Rev. Parris seems to refer to the same Mather question, but by this time Parris comes down definitively on the side of presumed innocence. Parris writes, "I question not but God sometimes suffers the Devil, as of late, to afflict in shape of not only innocent, but pious persons, or so to delude the senses of the afflicted, that they strongly conceit their hurt is from such persons, when indeed it is not." In contrast to the Mather's "rare and extraordinary," Parris has increased the frequency to "sometimes." Parris' use of the word "delude" is also notable because this was a term long associated with skepticism and the Calvinistic doctrinal view opposed to a belief in the validity of acts of witchcraft.

== Arrangements & By-laws ==
The group met mid-morning on Mondays “...once in six weeks, or oftener if need shall be.” At the end of each meeting the date of the next was chosen. A moderator was also chosen to keep the minutes at the next meeting and he also chose the next question for the group to ponder and discuss.

"Our work at the said meetings shall be 1) to debate any matter relating to ourselves. 2) To hear and consider any cases which shall be proposed to us from any other associations or private persons. 3) To answer any letters directed to us from any other associations or persons. 4) To discourse of any question proposed at the former meeting.

== Provenance of the Record Book ==
The Massachusetts Historical Society acquired the record book in 1850 and have traced it back to original member Charles Morton who had also taken part in similar group in England called the Cornwall Association 1655-1659. The records of the Cornwall association immediately precede those of the Cambridge Association. The Rules and Regulations are similar for both associations and are believed to be in Morton's handwriting. Morton likely brought the record book to New England when he emigrated.

Despite its availability in the archives, important Salem historians Charles W. Upham and George Lincoln Burr do not seem to have been aware of it, perhaps because it was filed under Morton's name and begins in Cornwall, England. Neither historian cites the record book though it would have supported their arguments.

== Later Developments and Offshoots ==
The group has been claimed as the first formal association of Congregational ministers in America. Between 1700 and 1745, some members of the original association divided into the "Associated Ministers of Boston and Charlestown" and the "Association in and about Cambridge." In 1960, these two groups reunited as the Greater Boston Association of Unitarian Ministers.
