= Elizabeth Proctor =

Convicted of witchcraft during the Salem Witch Trials (1650–after 1703)

Elizabeth Proctor (née Bassett; 1650 – after 1703) was convicted of witchcraft in the Salem Witch Trials of 1692. She was the wife of John Proctor, who was convicted and executed.

Her execution was postponed since she was pregnant. In 1693 the new governor, Sir William Phips, freed 153 prisoners, including Elizabeth. The widow Proctor remarried in 1699, to Daniel Richards. In 1703 she and her late husband John Proctor were granted a reversal of attainder by the Massachusetts legislature. Despite not being executed as a result of her 1692 witchcraft conviction, the exact date, location, and circumstances of her death remain unknown, though historical records show she died sometime after 1703.

== Early life ==
Proctor was born in 1650 in Lynn, Massachusetts, and was the daughter of Capt. William Bassett Sr. and Sarah Burt. She married John Proctor on April 1, 1674 in Salem, Massachusetts.

Proctor's grandmother was Ann (Holland) Bassett Burt, a Quaker and a midwife. The Puritans felt there was something "witchlike" about Quakers. Since Burt was not a doctor, but was successful at caring for those who were ill, some felt she could only have these skills if she were a witch. She was charged with witchcraft in 1669. One of those who testified against Burt was Phillip Read, a doctor. These accusations left a taint in the memories of residents and may have contributed to Proctor's persecution nearly 30 years later.

== Salem witch trials ==
=== Accusations of witchcraft ===
In early March 1692, the Proctors' servant, Mary Warren, began to have fits, saying she saw the ghost of Giles Corey. John Proctor was dismissive of her claims (as he was of all the accusations) and made her work harder; he felt that witchcraft should be suspected of the bewitched girls themselves and not of the respectable women of the village. His negative reactions to the girls' accusations may have caused Proctor to become one of the next to be accused of practicing witchcraft.

On March 26, 1692, Mercy Lewis made the first accusations that Proctor's spectre was tormenting her. William Rayment, of nearby Beverly, Massachusetts, mentioned he had heard a rumor that Proctor would be questioned in court the next day. Appearing to go into a trance, one of the girls cried, "There's Goody Proctor! Old Witch! I'll have her hung." When onlookers expressed doubt, claiming that the Proctor family was well regarded in the community, the girl promptly came out of her trance and told them it was all for "sport".

On March 29, 1692, Abigail Williams and Mercy Lewis again said they were being tormented by Proctor's spectre. A few days later, Williams complained that Proctor was pinching her and tearing at her bowels, and said she saw Proctor's spectre as well as John's. In April 1692, 31 men from Ipswich, Massachusetts, filed a petition attesting to the upstanding character of the Proctors and denying that they had ever seen anything that would indicate either of the couple were witches.

In May 1692, a similar petition was filed on behalf of the Proctors, containing signatures of 20 men and women, including several of the wealthiest landowners of Topsfield, Massachusetts and Salem Village. The petition questioned the validity of spectral evidence, testified to the Christian lives that the Proctors had led, said that they "were ever ready to help such as stood in need of their help", and that the petitioners had no reason to believe the couple were witches.

On June 2, 1692, a male doctor and several women completed a physical examination of Proctor and several of the other accused. They looked for birth defects, moles or other markings, which were widely believed at the time to be a sign that the person was a witch; the examiners found no such marks.

On August 2, 1692, the court met in Salem to discuss the fate of the Proctors and several others. At some point during this time, John wrote his will, but he did not include Proctor. Some believe this is because he assumed she would be executed along with him. In spite of the petitions and testimonies from friends, both of the Proctors were found guilty, and were sentenced to death on August 5, 1692. Proctor, who was pregnant at the time, was granted a stay of execution until after the birth of the baby. John tried to postpone his execution, but failed. On August 19, 1692, John was executed. Proctor remained in jail. Action was eventually taken on the petition that John had filed to save his life and that of Proctor, but it was too late for him.

=== Release ===
In January 1693, several hundred people were still in prison awaiting trial. On January 27, while imprisoned, Proctor gave birth to a son, whom she named John Proctor III after her husband. Proctor was not executed as the court had ordered for unknown reasons.

In May 1693, the girls began to accuse Lady Mary Phips, wife of the Governor of Massachusetts Sir William Phips. The Governor then ordered the remaining 153 prisoners to be set free. Proctor was among this general release of prisoners. Before she was released, her family was required to pay her prison fees. At this time, families were required to pay for their family members' room and board while in jail, as well as the cost of their executions.

=== Accusations against other Proctor family members ===
In 1692, 141 complaints were filed. Of those, 12 were against relatives or extended members of the Proctor family. John Proctor, Elizabeth Proctor, and Rebecca Nurse were convicted, and John and Rebecca were executed.

1. John Proctor, husband of Elizabeth Bassett aka Elizabeth Proctor and the father of Benjamin, William, and Sarah Proctor.
2. Elizabeth Bassett Proctor, third wife of John Proctor.
3. Benjamin Proctor, son of John Proctor and his first wife Martha Giddens.
4. William Proctor, son of John Proctor and his third wife, Elizabeth Bassett Proctor.
5. Sarah Proctor, daughter of John Proctor and his third wife, Elizabeth Bassett Proctor.
6. Mary Bassett DeRich was the sister of Elizabeth Bassett Proctor.

==== Extended family ====
1. Thomas Farrar Sr., father-in-law of Elizabeth (Hood) Farrar, sister of Sarah Hood aka Sarah Bassett
2. Elizabeth Hutchinson, wife of Isaac Hart whose sister, Deborah Hart, was married to Benjamin Proctor, brother of John Proctor.
3. Elizabeth Proctor, daughter of John Proctor and Elizabeth Thorndike Proctor, married Thomas Very in 1681. His sister, Elizabeth Very was the second wife of John Nurse, the eldest son of Francis and Rebecca (née Towne) Nurse.
4. Rebecca Nurse, sister of Mary Eastey and Sarah Cloyce.
5. Mary Eastey, sister of Rebecca Nurse and Sarah Cloyce.
6. Sarah Cloyce, sister of Rebecca Nurse and Mary Eastey.
7. Esther Elwell (née Dutch), aka Hester Elwell — wed to Samuel Elwell, brother of Thomas Elwell; sister-in-law to Sarah Bassett Elwell, another of Elizabeth Bassett Proctor's sisters.

==== Family tree ====
John Proctor Sr.	Martha Harper	Capt. William Bassett Sr.	Sarah Burt
Benjamin Proctor	Martha (Giddens) Proctor	John Proctor	Elizabeth (Bassett) Proctor	Sarah (Bassett) Elwell	Thomas Elwell Sr.	Mary (Bassett) DeRich	William Bassett Jr.	Sarah (Hood) Bassett
Benjamin Proctor	William Proctor	Sarah Proctor

=== Related accuser ===
One other family member was drawn into the Trials, joining the accusers: 16-year-old John DeRich, son of the imprisoned Bassett, and her husband, Michel DeRich, who had recently died.

=== Trial aftermath ===
Though Proctor was free, the ordeal was not over for her. As she had been convicted, in the eyes of the law she was a dead person, separated from society. Although the law stated that possessions would be seized when someone was convicted, the Proctors' possessions were confiscated long before their trials. Proctor could not claim any of John's property. She could not regain her dowry, because legally, she no longer existed. Proctor petitioned the General Court for reversal of attainder to restore her legal rights. No action was taken by the government for seven years, although it was already widely accepted that innocent people had been wrongly convicted.

In June 1696 Proctor filed an appeal to contest her husband's will. She testified in court that in that "sad time of darkness before my said husband was executed it is evident somebody had contrived a will and brought it to him to sign, wherein his whole estate is disposed of". The will had already been granted probate and assets distributed and she stated that her step-children "will not suffer me to have one penny of the estate, neither upon the account of my husband's contract with me before marriage nor yet upon the account of the dower which, as I humbly conceive, doth belong or ought to belong to me by law, for they say that I am dead in the law".

On April 19, 1697, the probate court ordered Proctor's step-children to return to her the dowry as she was "now restored to benefit of law".

The public demanded that the courts apologize, and a written apology was issued on March 18, 1702. On March 2, 1703, 21 spouses and children of those condemned, as well as three women who were convicted but not executed, including Proctor, filed petitions before any action was taken on Proctor's appeal for reversal of attainder. They requested that "something may be publicly done to take off infamy from the names". Two more petitions were filed in June 1703. These included requests from eleven ministers to reconsider the convictions and restore the good names of the citizens.

In July 1703, an address was made to the General Court requesting the petitions from the families be granted. Finally, action was taken to obtain the reversal of attainder for Proctor. The Massachusetts House of Representatives passed a bill that year formally disallowing spectral evidence, but reversing attainder only for those who had filed petitions, which applied only to John and Elizabeth Proctor, and Rebecca Nurse.

In 1705 another petition was filed requesting a more equitable settlement for those wrongly accused. In May 1709, 22 people who had been convicted of witchcraft, or whose parents had been convicted of witchcraft, presented the General Court with a petition to take action on the 1705 proposal demanding both a reversal of attainder and compensation for financial losses. In May 1710 the legislature appointed a committee to hear the petitions. After many delays, on 17 October 1711 the General Court passed a bill reversing the judgment against the people listed in the 1709 petition and Governor Joseph Dudley signed the bill into law. There were still an additional seven people who had been convicted, but had not signed the petition. There was no reversal of attainder for them. The bill read as follows:

Province of Massachusetts Bay Anno Regni, Anna Reginae Decimo.

An act to remove the attainders of George Burroughs and others for Witchcraft.

Forasmuch as in the year of Our Lord, one thousand six hundred and ninety-two several towns within the Province were infested with a horrible witchcraft or possession of devils. And at a special court of Oyer and Termina holden at Salem in the county of Essex in the same year 1692, George Burroughs of Wells, John Proctor, George Jacobs, John Williard, Giles Corey and Martha his wife, Rebecca Nurse and Sarah Good, all of Salem aforesaid; Elizabeth How of Ipswich; mary Easty, Sarah Wilde and Abigail Hobbs all of Topsfield; Samuel Wardwell, Mary Parker, Martha Carrier, Abigail Faulkner, Ann Foster, Rebecca Eames, Mary Post and Mary Lacey, all of Andover; Mary Bradbury of Salisbury, and Dorcas Hoar of Beverly, were severally indicated, convicted and attainted of witchcraft, and some of them put to death, others lying still under the like sentence of the said court and liable to have the same executed upon them.

The influence and energy of the evil spirit so great at that time acting in and upon those who were the principal accusers and witnesses proceeding so far as to cause a prosecution to be had of persons of known and good reputation which caused a great dissatisfaction and a stop to be put thereunto until their majesties pleasure should be known therein; and upon a representation thereof accordingly made, her late Majesty, Queen Mary, the Second of Blessed Memory, by Her royal letter given at her court at Whitehall the fifteenth of April 1693, was graciously pleased to approve the care and circumspection therein; and to will and require that in all proceedings against persons accused for witchcraft, or being possessed by the Devil, the greatest moderation and all due circumspection be used so far as the same may be without impediment to the ordinary course of justice.

And some of the principal accusers and witnesses in those dark and severe prosecutions have since discovered themselves to be persons of profligate and vicious conversation. Upon the humble petition and suite of several of said persons and of the children of others of them whose parents were executed.

Be it declared and enacted by His Excellency, the Governor, Council and Representatives authority of the same, That the several convictions, in General Court assembled, and by the judgements and attainders against the said George Burroughs, John Proctor, George Jacobs, John Williard, Giles Core [sic], Martha Core, Rebecca Nurse, Sarah Good, Elizabeth How, Mary Easty, Sarah Wild, Abagail [sic] Hobbs, Samuel Wardell, Mary Parker, Martha Carrier, Abagail [sic] Faulkner, Anne Foster, Rebecca Eames, Mary Post, Mary Lacey, Mary Bradbury, Dorcas Hoar, and any of them be and are hereby reversed made and declared to be null and void to all intents, constitutionalism and purposes whatsoever as if no such convictions, judgements and attainders had ever been had or given, and that no penalties or forfeitures of goods or chattels be by the said judgements and attainders or either of them had or incurred. Any law, usage or custom to the contrary notwithstanding. And that no sheriff, constable, goaler [sic] or other officer shall be liable to any prosecution in the law for anything they then legally did in the execution of their respective offices.

Made and passed by the Great and General Court or Assembly of Her Majestys Province of the Massachusetts Bay in New England, held at Boston the 17th day of Oct. 1711

The 22 people in the 1709 petition were awarded the sum of £578 and 12 shillings to be divided among the survivors and relatives of those accused. However, reversal of attainder and monies were only awarded to the accused and their heirs who had asked for it. £150 were awarded to "John Proctor and wife", but Proctor's name was not specifically mentioned. Thorndike Proctor received money for his family's suffering. His older brother Benjamin Proctor objected as he had been the one responsible for taking care of his siblings during this time. The court took no action, leaving it up to the family to determine how to divide the funds. Most of the accounts were settled within a year. The award to the Proctor family was $1500, much more money from the Massachusetts General Court than most families of accused witches, a possible indicator of the wealth of the families involved.

Thorndike Proctor purchased the Groton Farm from the Downing family of London, England, following the hanging of his father. The farm was renamed Downing Farm. Thorndike subsequently sold nearly half of Downing Farm to his half-brother Benjamin. Eight generations of Proctors resided on the Downing farm, until 1851.

By 1957, not all the condemned had been exonerated. Descendants of those falsely accused demanded the General Court clear the names of their family members. In 1957 an act was passed pronouncing the innocence of those accused; however, it only listed Ann Pudeator by name and the others as "certain other persons", still failing to include all names of those convicted. They also included a resolution prohibiting further lawsuits based on old court proceedings.

In 1992, the Danvers Tercentennial Committee persuaded the Massachusetts House of Representatives to issue a resolution honoring "the courage and steadfastness of these condemned persons who adhered to truth when the legal, clerical, and political institutions failed them". While the document did list the names of all those not previously granted reversal of attainder, it only noted that these individuals were "worthy of remembrance and commemoration".

After efforts by, among others, Representatives J. Michael Ruane and Paul Tirone, and Salem schoolteacher, Paula Keene, when it was finally signed on October 31, 2001, by Governor Jane Swift, more than 300 years later, all were finally proclaimed innocent.

== The Crucible ==
In the 1953 play The Crucible by Arthur Miller, Abigail Williams, mistress to John Proctor, secretly pierces her abdomen deeply with a needle, then pretends that it is the doing of a witch. She falsely accuses Proctor's wife, Elizabeth Proctor, of having pierced the abdomen of a witch's "poppet" doll with a needle in order to torment her, and accuses her of witchcraft. After this event, many in the community find other reasons to suspect Elizabeth Proctor.

== See also ==
- The Crucible (1957 film)
- The Crucible (1996 film)

== Bibliography ==
- University of Massachusetts: John Proctor
- The Salem News, “Documents Shed New Light On Witchcraft Trials”, By Betsy Taylor, news staff Danvers, Massachusetts
- The History of the Town of Danvers, from its Earliest Settlement to 1848, by J. W. Hanson, copyright 1848, published by the author, printed at the Courier Office, Danvers, Massachusetts
- House of John Proctor, Witchcraft Martyr, 1692, by William P. Upham, copyright 1904, Press of C. H. Shephard, Peabody, Massachusetts,
- Puritan City, The Story of Salem, by Frances Winwar, King County Library System, 917.44, copyright 1938, Robert M. McBride & County, New York.
- The Salem witchcraft papers : verbatim transcripts of the legal documents of the Salem witchcraft outbreak of 1692 / compiled and transcribed in 1938 by the Works Progress Administration, under the supervision of Archie N. Frost; edited and with an introduction and index by Paul Boyer and Stephen Nissenbaum; Electronic Text Center, University of Virginia Library; pg. 662; Essex County Archives, Salem—Witchcraft Vol. 1
- The Founders of the Massachusetts Bay Colony, A Careful Research of the Earliest Records of Many of the Foremost Settlers of the New England Colony: Compiled From The Earliest Church and State Records, and Valuable Private Papers Retained by Descendants for Many Generations, by Sarah Saunders Smith, Press of the Sun Printing Company, 1897, Pittsfield Massachusetts.
- The Devil Discovered : Salem Witchcraft, 1692 by Gaylord Robinson
- Salem Possessed: The Social Origins of Witchcraft by Paul Boyer
- Chronicles of Old Salem, A History in Miniature by Francis Diane Robotti
- The Devil in Massachusetts, A Modern Enquiry Into the Salem Witch Trials, by Marion L. Starkey, King County Library System, copyright 1949, Anchor Books / Doubleday Books, New York
- A Delusion of Satan: The Full Story of the Salem Witch Trials by Frances Hill
- The Salem Witch Trials Reader by Frances Hill
- The Witchcraft of Salem Village by Shirley Jackson
- Salem Witchcraft; With an Account of Salem Village and a History of Opinions on Witchcraft and Kindred Subjects. by Charles W. Upham
- The Devil Hath Been Raised: A Documentary History of the Salem Village Witchcraft Outbreak of March 1692 by Richard B. Trask
- The Visionary Girls: Witchcraft in Salem Village by Marion Lena Starkey
- The Salem Witch Trials, A Day by Day Chronicle of a Community Under Siege, by Marilynne K. Roach, copyright 2002, Cooper Square Press, New York, NY.
- Wonders of the Invisible World by Cotton Mather
- More Wonders of the Invisible World by Robert Calef
