= John Proctor (Salem witch trials) =

Convicted of witchcraft (1632–1692)

- Born: 9 October 1631; Suffolk, England
- Died: 19 August 1692 (aged 60); Salem Village
- Spouse(s): Martha (m. c. 1653; d. 1659); Elizabeth Thorndike (m. 1662; d. 1672) Elizabeth Bassett (m. 1674)
- Children: 18 Total; 4 (with Martha ________); 7 (with Thorndike); 7 (with Bassett)
- Status: Executed by hanging (19 August 1692; 334 years ago); Exonerated (31 October 2001)
- Conviction: Witchcraft (posthumously overturned)

John Proctor (9 October 1631 – 19 August 1692) was a landowner, farmer and proprietor in the Massachusetts Bay Colony. He and his 3rd wife Elizabeth Bassett were tried and convicted of witchcraft during the Salem Witch Trials, whereupon he was hanged.

== Early life ==
Proctor was born in Suffolk, England, christened on 9 Oct 1631 at Assington, England. to John Proctor (1594–1672) and Martha Harper (1607–1667). Proctor Sr. and Martha Harper married 1 Jun 1630 in Groton, Suffolk, England. When he was just three years old, his parents brought their family to America. They sailed from London on 12 April 1635 on a ship called the Susan and Ellen.

Upon arrival, they settled in the Chebacco area of Ipswich, Massachusetts. The elder Proctor owned many properties and was considered one of the wealthiest residents of Ipswich. He had two shares in Plum Island in 1664. He also held various offices within the colony..

== Confusion over Mother's Surname ==
Some researchers have incorrectly given his mother Martha the surname of Giddon or Giddens, but this has been proven to be highly unlikely. On 26 March 1667 in Ipswich Quarterly Court, “Gordge Giddeng,” age 59 made a deposition, and “John Prockter, Sr.”, age 75, deposed the same as “my brother Giddens” This is likely where the speculation began. The 1635 ships passenger list for the Susan and Ellen states that Martha is 35 years old. Martha Giddens was barely 16 at this time. She is also mentioned in her aunt's will after this date as Martha Giddens and not Proctor. There seem 3 possible solutions to this problem. Theory one, unlikely but possible, is that Martha (Harper) Proctor died before 1635, and that John Proctor married as his 2nd wife Martha Giddings. No records records have been found to prove this true. Theory two is also possible that John Proctor and George Giddings had children that married; in the 17th century and earlier, parents of children who married sometimes called themselves brothers or sisters. Again, no records have been found to prove this to be true. The records in George Giddings’s estate do not support such identification, though it is possible. The third theory is that George Giddings and John Proctor were “brothers in the church” and they were not otherwise related. In 17th century records, the term “brother” and “sister” occur in the sense of a church relationship, but this usage is rare.

== Adult life ==
Proctor was a good businessman, comfortable working with people from all levels of society. Around 1653, Proctor married Martha (surname unknown). They had four children: John (1653–1658), Martha (1655–1658), Mary (1656/57–1657/58) and Benjamin (1659–1720).

Martha died in childbirth on 13 June 1659. Her death registry reads "Martha, wife of John Procter, died the 13 June 1659"; Benjamin Proctor was the only surviving child from this marriage.

On 1 December 1662, Proctor married Elizabeth Thorndike (1641–1672), daughter of John Thorndike, founder of Ipswich, Massachusetts. They had seven children: Elizabeth (1663–1736) married in 1681 to Thomas Very; Martha (1665–?); Martha married Nathaniel Gowing; Mary (1667–1668); John (1668–1748); Mary (1669–?); Thorndike (1672–1759), married in 1697 to Hannah Felton, widow of Samuel Endicott, the grandson of John Endicott, the first Governor of Massachusetts Bay Colony and daughter of Nathaniel Felton and Mary Skelton.

In 1666, Proctor moved to Salem, Massachusetts and leased a 700-acre estate called Groton farm (also known as Downing Farm) in Salem Farms, the section of Salem Township just to the south of Salem Village in what is now part of Peabody. The farm was leased from Emmanuel Downing, brother-in-law to John Winthrop. In 1668, Proctor received his first license to operate a tavern here and the license was renewed annually. The Inn was located on Ipswich Road about a mile south of the Salem Village line. Elizabeth (Thorndike) Proctor died on 30 August 1672 shortly after she gave birth to their seventh child, Thorndike Proctor. Proctor's father also died in 1672 and he inherited 1/3 of the estate in Ipswich. His brothers Benjamin and Joseph inherited the other 2/3 of the estate. Each portion was valued at £1,200.

On 1 April 1674, Proctor married Elizabeth Bassett (1651–?), daughter of William and Sarah (Burt) Bassett of Lynn, Massachusetts. They had seven children: William (1674/5 – after 1695); Sarah (1677–1751); Samuel (1685–1765); Elisha (1687–1688); Abigail (1689 – after 1695); Joseph (before 1691 – ?); John (1693–1745).<

Elizabeth and some of the older children ran the tavern while Proctor and his eldest son, Benjamin, tended to their extensive farm properties in Salem and Ipswich. If customers in the tavern had insufficient funds, Elizabeth insisted they pay with pawned goods.

Giles Corey became easily frustrated with his neighbors. At one point, he filed a lawsuit against Proctor who had suggested that Corey was responsible for setting the Proctor house on fire. Later, one of Proctor's sons confessed.

== Accusations and trial ==
Initial accusations were aimed at Proctor's third wife, Elizabeth (Bassett). When he began to defend her and vocally express his disbelief in the accusers, fingers were then pointed at him as well. Although Abigail Williams was John Proctor's chief accuser, he was also named by Mary Walcott, who stated he tried to choke her, and by his former servant Mary Warren on 21 April.

The Proctors were tried on 5 August 1692, found guilty, and sentenced to death by hanging. While Proctor and his wife were still in jail, the sheriff seized all of their household belongings. The cattle were sold cheaply, slaughtered, or shipped to the West Indies. The beer barrels at the tavern were emptied. Their children were left with no means of support. Proctor was hanged on 19 August 1692. Elizabeth, who was then pregnant, was given a reprieve until she gave birth, which came after the trials ended.

=== Accusations against other Proctor family members ===
In 1692, one hundred and forty-one complaints were filed. Of those, twelve were against relatives or extended members of the Proctor family. John Proctor, Elizabeth Proctor, and Rebecca Nurse were convicted, and John and Rebecca were executed.

1. John Proctor, husband of Elizabeth Bassett aka Elizabeth Proctor and the father of Benjamin, William, and Sarah Proctor.
2. Elizabeth Proctor (nee Bassett), third wife of John Proctor and mother of William and Sarah Proctor.
3. Benjamin Proctor, son of John Proctor and his first wife Martha.
4. William Proctor, son of John Proctor and his third wife, Elizabeth Bassett.
5. Mary DeRich (nee Bassett), the sister of Elizabeth Proctor (nee Bassett).

Extended family:

1. Thomas Farrar Sr., father-in-law of Elizabeth Farrar (nee Hood), sister of Sarah Bassett (nee Hood).
2. Elizabeth Hutchinson, wife of Isaac Hart whose daughter, Deborah Hart, was married to Benjamin Proctor, brother of John Proctor.
3. Elizabeth Proctor, daughter of John Proctor and Elizabeth (Thorndike) Proctor, married Thomas Very in 1681. His sister, Elizabeth Very was the second wife of John Nurse, the eldest son of Francis and Rebecca (née Towne) Nurse.
4. Rebecca Nurse (nee Towne), sister of Mary Eastey and Sarah Cloyce.
5. Mary Eastey (nee Towne), sister of Rebecca Nurse and Sarah Cloyce.
6. Sarah Cloyce (nee Towne), sister of Rebecca Nurse and Mary Eastey.
7. Esther or Hester Elwell (nee Dutch), was married to Samuel Elwell, brother of Thomas Elwell; sister-in-law to Sarah Elwell (nee Bassett), another of Elizabeth (Bassett) Proctor's sisters.

Family Tree:

John Proctor Sr.	Martha Harper	Capt. William Bassett Sr.	Sarah Burt
Benjamin Proctor	Martha (Unknown) Proctor	John Proctor	Elizabeth (Bassett) Proctor	Sarah (Bassett) Elwell	Thomas Elwell Sr.	Mary (Bassett) DeRich	William Bassett Jr.	Sarah (Hood) Bassett
Benjamin Proctor	William Proctor	Sarah Proctor

=== Related accuser ===
One other family member was drawn into the Trials, joining the accusers: 16-year-old John DeRich, the son of the imprisoned Mary (Bassett) DeRich and her husband, Michel DeRich, who had recently died. John testified against George and Sarah Jacobs, Giles Corey, and Sarah Pease.

== Aftermath ==
In June 1696, Elizabeth filed an appeal to contest her husband's will. She testified in court that "in that sad time of darkness before my said husband was executed it is evident somebody had contrived a will and brought it to him to sign, wherein his whole estate is disposed of." The will had already been probated and assets distributed and she stated that her step-children "will not suffer me to have one penny of the estate, neither upon the account of my husband's contract with me before marriage nor yet upon the account of the dower which, as I humbly conceive, doth belong or ought to belong to me by law, for they say that I am dead in the law".

On 22 September 1696, Elizabeth remarried to Daniel Richards. On 19 April 1697, the probate court ordered Elizabeth's step-children to return to her the dowry as she was "now restored to benefit of law.

On 2 March 1703, twenty-one spouses and children of those condemned, as well as three women who were convicted but not executed, including Elizabeth, filed petitions before any action was taken on Elizabeth's appeal for reversal of attainder. They requested that "something may be publicly done to take off infamy from the names". Two more petitions were filed in June 1703. These included requests from eleven ministers to reconsider the convictions and restore the good names of the citizens. The Massachusetts House of Representatives finally passed a bill disallowing spectral evidence. However, they only gave a reversal of attainder for those who had filed petitions.

In 1705, another petition was filed requesting a more equitable settlement for those wrongly accused. In May 1709, 22 people who had been convicted of witchcraft, or whose parents had been convicted of witchcraft, presented the General Court with a petition to take action on the 1705 proposal demanding both a reversal of attainder and compensation for financial losses. In May 1710, the legislature appointed a committee to hear the petitions. After many delays, on 17 October 1711, the General Court passed a bill reversing the judgment against the people listed in the 1709 petition and Governor Joseph Dudley signed the bill into law. There were still an additional seven people who had been convicted but had not signed the petition. There was no reversal of attainder for them. The bill read as follows:

Province of Massachusetts Bay Anno Regni, Anna Reginae Decimo.

An act to remove the attainders of George Burroughs and others for Witchcraft.

Forasmuch as in the year of Our Lord, one thousand six hundred and ninety-two several towns within the Province were infested with a horrible witchcraft or possession of devils. And at a special court of Oyer and Termina holden at Salem in the county of Essex in the same year 1692, George Burroughs of Wells, John Proctor, George Jacobs, John Williard, Giles Corey and Martha his wife, Rebecca Nurse and Sarah Good, all of Salem aforesaid; Elizabeth How of Ipswich; Mary Easty, Sarah Wilde and Abigail Hobbs all of Topsfield; Samuel Wardwell, Mary Parker, Martha Carrier, Abigail Faulkner, Ann Foster, Rebecca Eames, Mary Post and Mary Lacey, all of Andover; Mary Bradbury of Salisbury, and Dorcas Hoar of Beverly, were severally indicated, convicted and attainted of witchcraft, and some of them put to death, others lying still under the like sentence of the said court and liable to have the same executed upon them.

The influence and energy of the evil spirit so great at that time acting in and upon those who were the principal accusers and witnesses proceeding so far as to cause a prosecution to be had of persons of known and good reputation which caused a great dissatisfaction and a stop to be put thereunto until their majesties pleasure should be known therein; and upon a representation thereof accordingly made, her late Majesty, Queen Mary, the Second of Blessed Memory, by Her royal letter given at her court at Whitehall the fifteenth of April 1693, was graciously pleased to approve the care and circumspection therein; and to will and require that in all proceedings against persons accused for witchcraft, or being possessed by the Devil, the greatest moderation and all due circumspection be used so far as the same may be without impediment to the ordinary course of justice.

And some of the principal accusers and witnesses in those dark and severe prosecutions have since discovered themselves to be persons of profligate and vicious conversation. Upon the humble petition and suite of several of said persons and of the children of others of them whose parents were executed.

Be it declared and enacted by His Excellency, the Governor, Council and Representatives authority of the same, That the several convictions, in General Court assembled, and by the judgements and attainders against the said George Burroughs, John Proctor, George Jacobs, John Williard, [sic] Giles Core, Martha Core, Rebecca Nurse, Sarah Good, Elizabeth How, Mary Easty, Sarah Wild, Abagail [sic] Hobbs, Samuel Wardell, Mary Parker, Martha Carrier, Abagail [sic] Faulkner, Anne Foster, Rebecca Eames, Mary Post, Mary Lacey, Mary Bradbury, Dorcas Hoar, and any of them be and are hereby reversed made and declared to be null and void to all intents, constitutionalism and purposes whatsoever as if no such convictions, judgements and attainders had ever been had or given, and that no penalties or forfeitures of goods or chattels be by the said judgements and attainders or either of them had or incurred. Any law, usage or custom to the contrary notwithstanding. And that no sheriff, constable, goaler [sic] or other officer shall be liable to any prosecution in the law for anything they then legally did in the execution of their respective offices.

Made and passed by the Great and General Court or Assembly of Her Majestys Province of the Massachusetts Bay in New England, held at Boston the 17th day of Oct. 1711.

The 22 people in the 1709 petition were awarded the sum of £578-12-0 to be divided among the survivors and relatives of those accused. However, reversal of attainder and monies were only awarded to the accused and their heirs who had asked for it. £150 were awarded to "John Proctor and wife, but Elizabeth's name was not specifically mentioned. Thorndike Proctor received money for his family's suffering. His older brother Benjamin objected as he had been the one responsible for taking care of his siblings during this time. The court took no action, leaving it up to the family to determine how to divide the funds. Most of the accounts were settled within a year. The award to the Proctor family was $1500, much more money from the Massachusetts General Court than most families of accused witches, a possible indicator of the wealth of the families involved.

Thorndike Proctor purchased the Groton Farm from the Downing family of London, England, following the hanging of his father. The farm was renamed Downing Farm. Thorndike subsequently sold nearly half of Downing Farm to his half-brother Benjamin. Eight generations of Proctors resided on the Downing farm, until 1851.

By 1957, not all the condemned had been exonerated. Descendants of those falsely accused demanded the General Court clear the names of their family members. In 1957, an act was passed pronouncing the innocence of those accused, however, it only listed Ann Pudeator by name and the others as "certain other persons", still not including all names of those convicted. They also included a resolution prohibiting further lawsuits based on old court proceedings.

In 1992, the Danvers Tercentennial Committee persuaded the Massachusetts House of Representatives to issue a resolution honoring "the courage and steadfastness of these condemned persons who adhered to truth when the legal, clerical, and political institutions failed them". While the document did list the names of all those not previously granted reversal of attainder, it only noted that these individuals were "worthy of remembrance and commemoration".

After concerted efforts by a Salem schoolteacher named Paula Keene, and Representatives J. Michael Ruane and Paul Tirone et al., a proclamation of innocence for all the victims was finally signed by Governor Jane Swift on 31 October 2001. More than 300 years after the witch trials, all of its victims were finally exonerated of their supposed guilt.

== In popular culture ==
In The Crucible by Arthur Miller, a 1953 fictionalized version of the trials portrayed as a theatrical play, John Proctor is cast as the main character whose story is centered around his powerful and unrivaled position in the society and consequential wrongfully convicted fate. However, the storyline of the play diverges from his actual history in numerous ways.

In the 1957 screen adaptation of Miller's piece, Proctor was depicted by Yves Montand. In the 1996 film based on the play, Proctor was played by Daniel Day-Lewis.

A re-examination of some issues in The Crucible takes place in the play John Proctor Is the Villain.

== Cited references ==
- Felton, Cyrus (1886)A Genealogical History of the Felton Family: Descendants of Lieutenant Nathaniel Felton Who Came to Salem Massachusetts in 1633; with Few Supplements and Appendices of the Names of Some of the Ancestors and Families that have Intermarried with them; An Index Alphabetically Arranged of the Felton Families and an Index of Other Names than Felton, Rutland, VT, Tuttle Co., 1935.
- Foulds, Diane E. (2010), Death in Salem, The Private Lives Behind the 1692 Witch Hunt, Globe Pequot Press, Guilford, CT, ISBN 978-0-7627-5909-5
- Hall, David D. Witch-Hunting in Seventeenth-Century New England: A Documentary History 1638–1693, Second Edition; Duke University Press; Boston, Mass., USA; 2005, pp. 185–189. ISBN 0-822-336138
- Hill, Frances (2000). The Salem Witch Trials Reader, Da Capo Press, Boston, Massachusetts, ISBN 0-306-80946-X
- Nevins, Winfield S. (1916), Witchcraft in Salem Village in 1692, Together with a Review of the Opinions of Modern Writers and Psychologists in Regard to the Outbreak of the Evil in America, fifth edition with preface of striking interest, North shore publishing company, Salem, Massachusetts.
- Proctor, A. Carlton (1979 & 1982), Proctor Genealogy ca 1562 to 1982, Descendants of Evan and Mary Proctor, St. Albans, Hertfordshire, England; Robert and Jane (Hildreth) Proctor, Concord-Chelmsford, Massachusetts, USA; John and Martha Proctor, Yorkshire, England and Many of their Related Families, OCLC ocm21968299
- Roach, Marilynne K. (2002), The Salem Witch Trials, A Day-By-Day Chronicle of a Community Under Siege, p. 587, New York: Cooper Square Press. ISBN 0-8154-1221-5
- Robinson, Enders A. (1991). The Devil Discovered: Salem Witchcraft, 1692, Hippocrene Books, New York, ISBN 0-87052-009-1

== General sources ==
- Boyer, Paul, and Stephen Nissenbaum, ed. The Salem witchcraft papers: verbatim transcripts of the legal documents of the Salem witchcraft outbreak of 1692 volume 1, compiled and transcribed by the Works Progress Administration, under the supervision of Archie N. Frost; edited and with an introduction and index by Paul Boyer and Stephen Nissenbaum; Electronic Text Center, University of Virginia Library; Essex County Archives, Salem—Witchcraft
- Boyer, Paul. Salem Possessed: The Social Origins of Witchcraft
- Hanson, J. W. (1848). The History of the Town of Danvers, from its Earliest Settlement to 1848, published by the author, printed at the Courier Office, Danvers, Massachusetts
- Hill, Frances. A Delusion of Satan: The Full Story of the Salem Witch Trials
- Jackson, Shirley. The Witchcraft of Salem Village
- Miller, Arthur (1953). The Crucible
- Robotti, Francis Diane. Chronicles of Old Salem, A History in Miniature
- Smith, Sarah Saunders (1897). The Founders of the Massachusetts Bay Colony, A Careful Research of the Earliest Records of Many of the Foremost Settlers of the New England Colony: Compiled From The Earliest Church and State Records, and Valuable Private Papers Retained by Descendants for Many Generations, Press of the Sun Printing Company, Pittsfield Massachusetts.
- Starkey, Marion L. (1949). The Devil in Massachusetts: A Modern Enquiry Into the Salem Witch Trials, Anchor Books / Doubleday Books, New York
- Starkey, Marion Lena. The Visionary Girls: Witchcraft in Salem Village
- Taylor, Betsy (2003). "Documents Shed New Light On Witchcraft Trials", The Salem News, Danvers, Massachusetts
- Trask, Richard B. The Devil Hath Been Raised: A Documentary History of the Salem Village Witchcraft Outbreak of March 1692
- Famous American Trials: Salem Witchcraft Trials 1692: John Proctor—University of Missouri-Kansas City
- Upham, Charles W. Salem Witchcraft; With an Account of Salem Village and a History of Opinions on Witchcraft and Kindred Subjects
- Upham, William P. (1904). House of John Proctor, Witchcraft Martyr, 1692, Press of C. H. Shephard, Peabody, Massachusetts
- Winwar, Frances (1938). Puritan City: The Story of Salem, Robert M. McBride & Company, New York.
