= Nathaniel Felton =

- Born: May 15, 1615; Great Yarmouth, Norfolk, England
- Died: July 30, 1705 (aged 90); Salem Village, Massachusetts Bay Colony
- Spouse(s): Mary Skelton (m. c. 1643)
- Children: 7

Nathaniel Felton (May 15, 1615 – July 30, 1705) was a landowner in the Massachusetts Bay Colony. He served as a juryman, grand juryman, constable, Ensign, and Lieutenant. He was the son of John Felton (1585–1627) and Ellen Thrower (1588–1652). His home was among the first built in what is now Peabody, Massachusetts. Together with the home of his son, Nathaniel Felton Jr., the pair of houses became known as the Nathaniel Felton Houses. He is known for his role in the drafting and, along with his wife, being the first to sign a petition in support of John Proctor.

== Early life ==
Nathaniel Felton was born in Great Yarmouth, England. He emigrated from England in 1633 with his mother during the Puritan migration to New England. Nathaniel Felton is considered to be the first ancestor of the "Northern line of Feltons" to arrive in the American colonies, settling in the Massachusetts Bay Colony.

== Salem Witch Trials ==
Coat of Arms of Nathaniel Felton

Nathaniel Felton's name is found on two petitions of support for individuals accused of witchcraft during the Salem witch trials. The first was that of Rebecca Nurse, who was arrested in 1692. His name appears on a list of 39 Salem residents who signed a petition in her defense. Fellow signatory, John Proctor was then also accused of witchcraft.

Subsequently, Nathaniel and several other neighbors drafted and signed a petition in support of John Proctor. The petition proved unsuccessful and John Proctor was executed upon the conclusion of his trial.

We whose names are under written having several years known John Procter and his wife do testify that we never heard or understood that they were ever suspected to be guilty of the crime now charged upon them and several of us being their near neighbours do testify that to our apprehension they lived christian life in their family and were ever ready to help such as stood in need of their help.

— Nathaniel Felton (first signature) and fellow signatories
