= Salem Village Historic District =

Historic district in Massachusetts, United States

- U.S. National Register of Historic Places
- U.S. Historic district
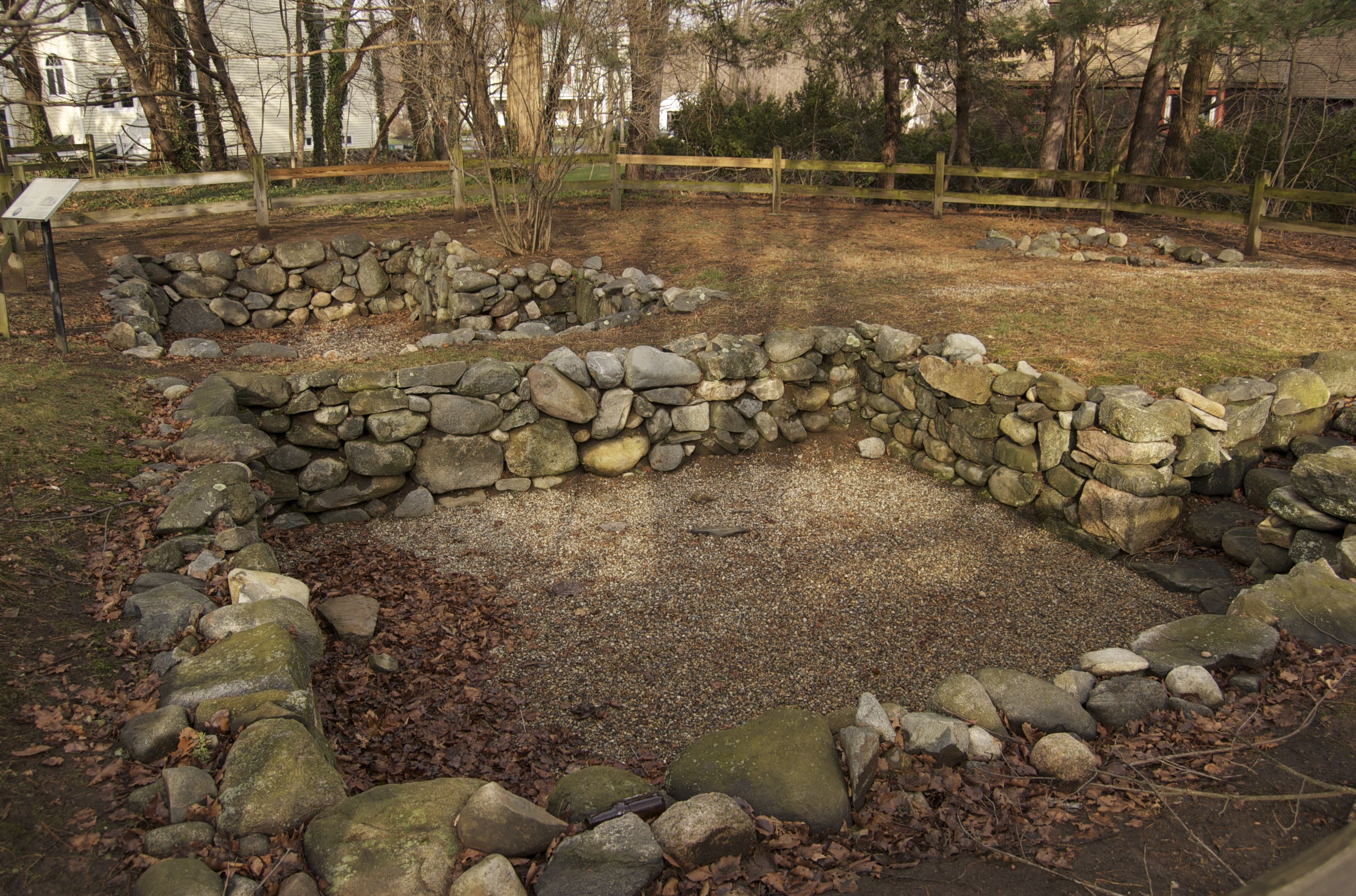
- Archeological site of the Salem Village Parsonage, where in 1692 the witchcraft hysteria began when the parson Samuel Parris suspected witchcraft had harmed his daughter.

- Location within Massachusetts Location within the United States
- Location: Danvers, Massachusetts
- Coordinates: 42°34′0″N 70°57′38″W
- Built: 1681
- Architect: Mudge, Josiah, et al.
- Architectural style: Greek Revival, Colonial, Federal
- NRHP reference No.: 75000252
- Added to NRHP: January 31, 1975

The Salem Village Historic District encompasses a collection of properties from the early center of Salem Village, as Danvers, Massachusetts was known in the 17th century. The district includes an irregular pattern of properties along Centre, Hobart, Ingersoll, Forest and Collins Streets, as far north as Brentwood Circle, and south to Mello Parkway. It includes several buildings notable for their association with the 1692 Salem witch trials, which were initially centered on individuals who lived in Salem Village. Included in the village are the Rebecca Nurse Homestead, now a house museum, and the remains of the local parsonage, both places of relevance to the witch hysteria.

The Town of Danvers, Mass., voted at the Annual Town Meeting on March 18, 1974 to establish this area as a local historic district regulated by a Historic District Commission, in order to preserve the historic structures and their architectural features. The district was then listed on the National Register of Historic Places in 1975.

== See also ==
- National Register of Historic Places listings in Essex County, Massachusetts
- List of the oldest buildings in Massachusetts
- Rebecca Nurse Homestead
- Samuel Holten
- Rebecca Nurse
- Samuel Parris
