= Cloyce =

Cloyce can be a masculine given name or a surname. Notable people with the name include:

- Cloyce Box (1923–1993), American football player and businessman
- Sarah Cloyce, American accused of witchcraft
