= Nathaniel Felton Houses =

Historic house in Massachusetts, United States

- U.S. National Register of Historic Places
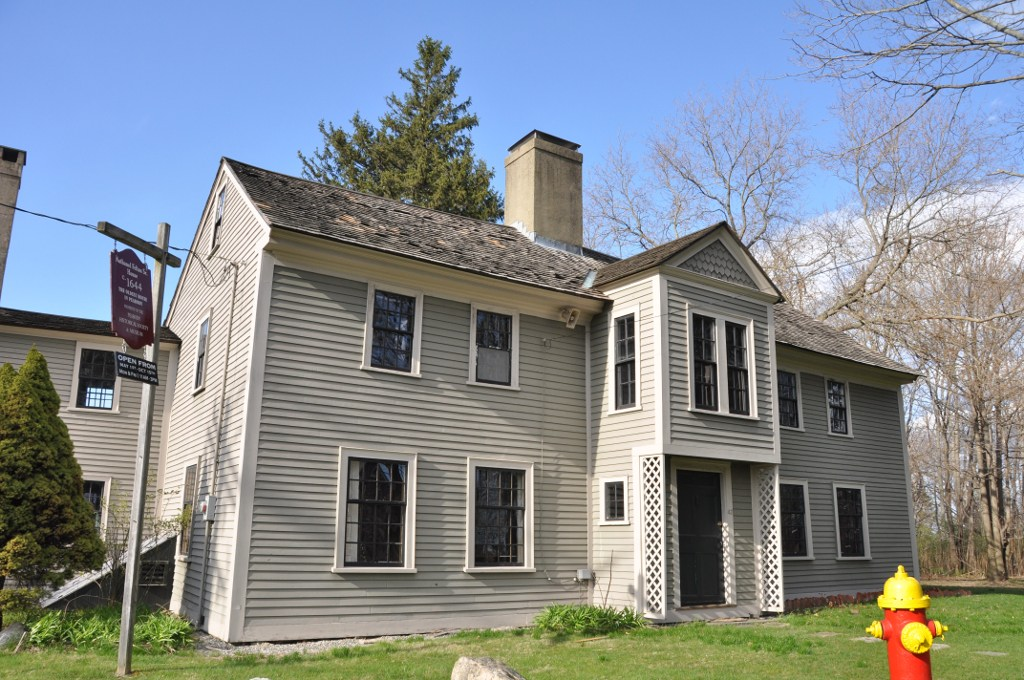
- Nathaniel Felton Sr. House

- Location within Massachusetts Location within the United States
- Location: Peabody, Massachusetts
- Coordinates: 42°32′44″N 70°57′40″W
- Built: c. 1700
- Architect: Nathaniel Felton Sr.
- NRHP reference No.: 82001882
- Added to NRHP: April 1, 1982

The Nathaniel Felton Houses are a pair of historic houses at 43 and 47 Felton Street in Peabody, Massachusetts. The Peabody Historical Society owns and operates the homes as historic house museums.

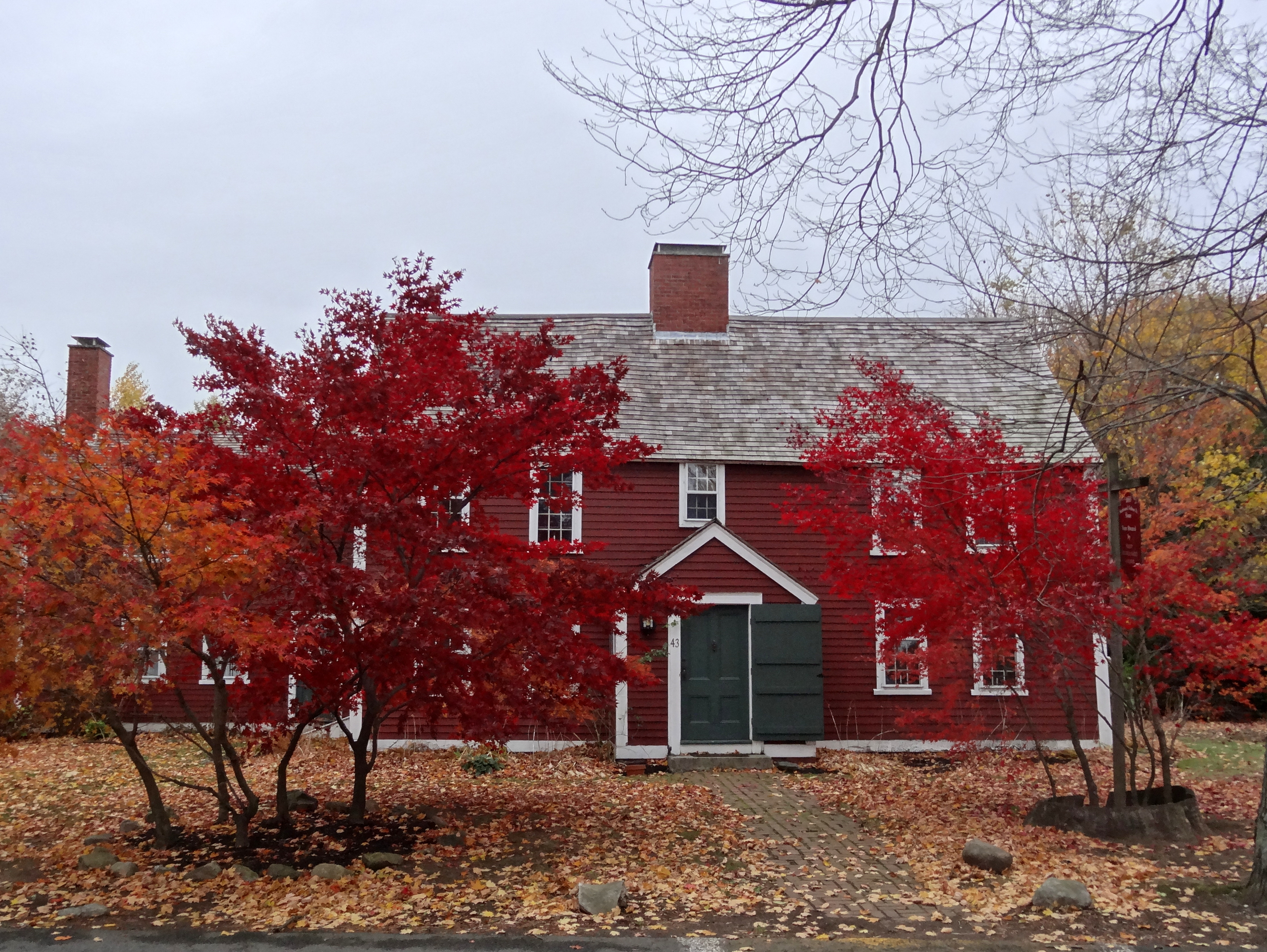
Nathaniel Felton Jr. House

The house of Nathaniel Felton Sr., at 47 Felton Street, was built c. 1700. The house of his son, Nathaniel Felton Jr., was built at a different location, and moved to its present location by his grandson.

The houses were listed on the National Register of Historic Places in 1982.

== See also ==
- National Register of Historic Places listings in Essex County, Massachusetts
- List of the oldest buildings in Massachusetts
