= Rebecca Nurse Homestead =

Colonial house in Massachusetts, US

Coordinates: 42.5582°N 70.9504°W

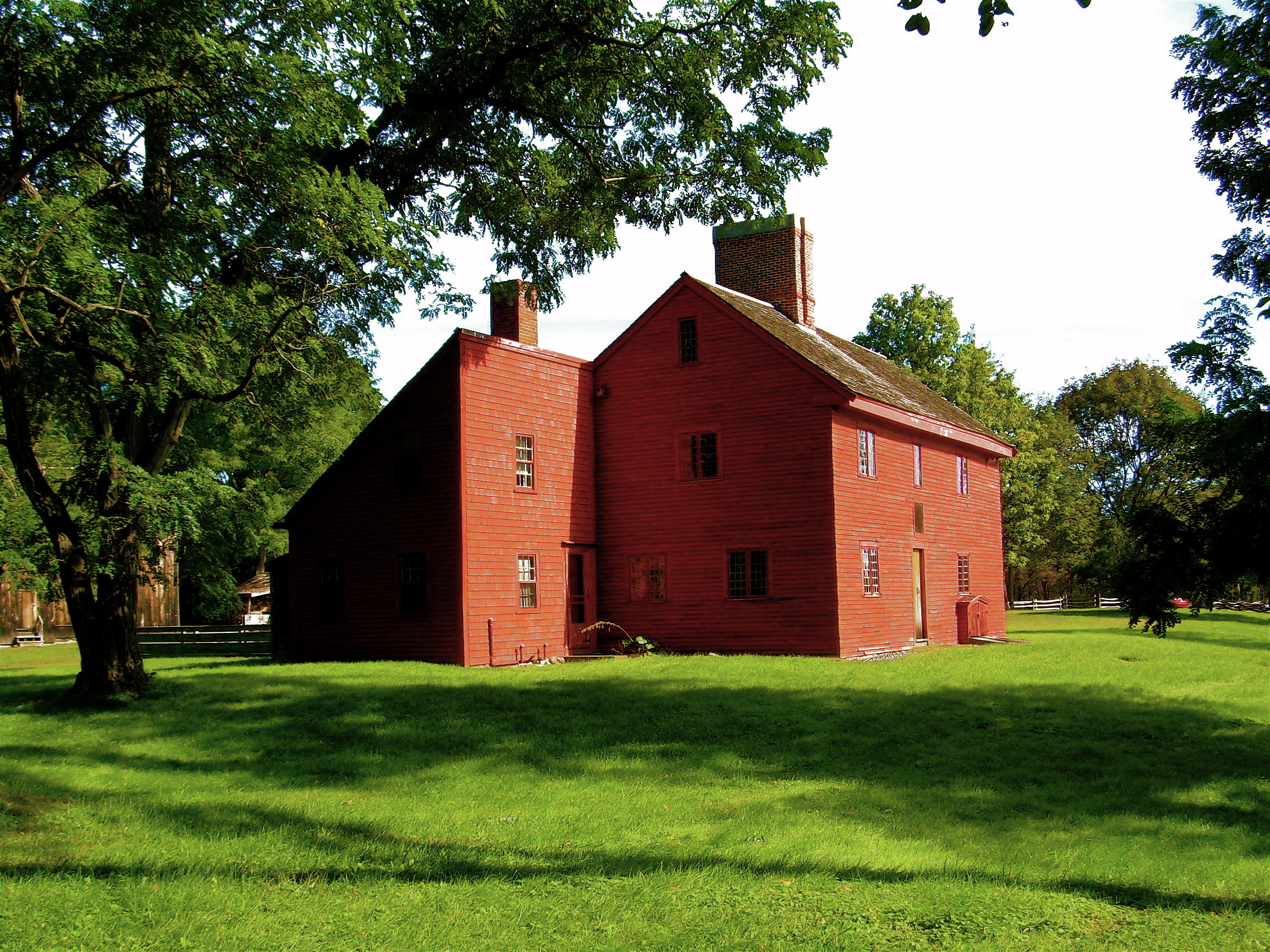
The Rebecca Nurse Homestead in 2006.

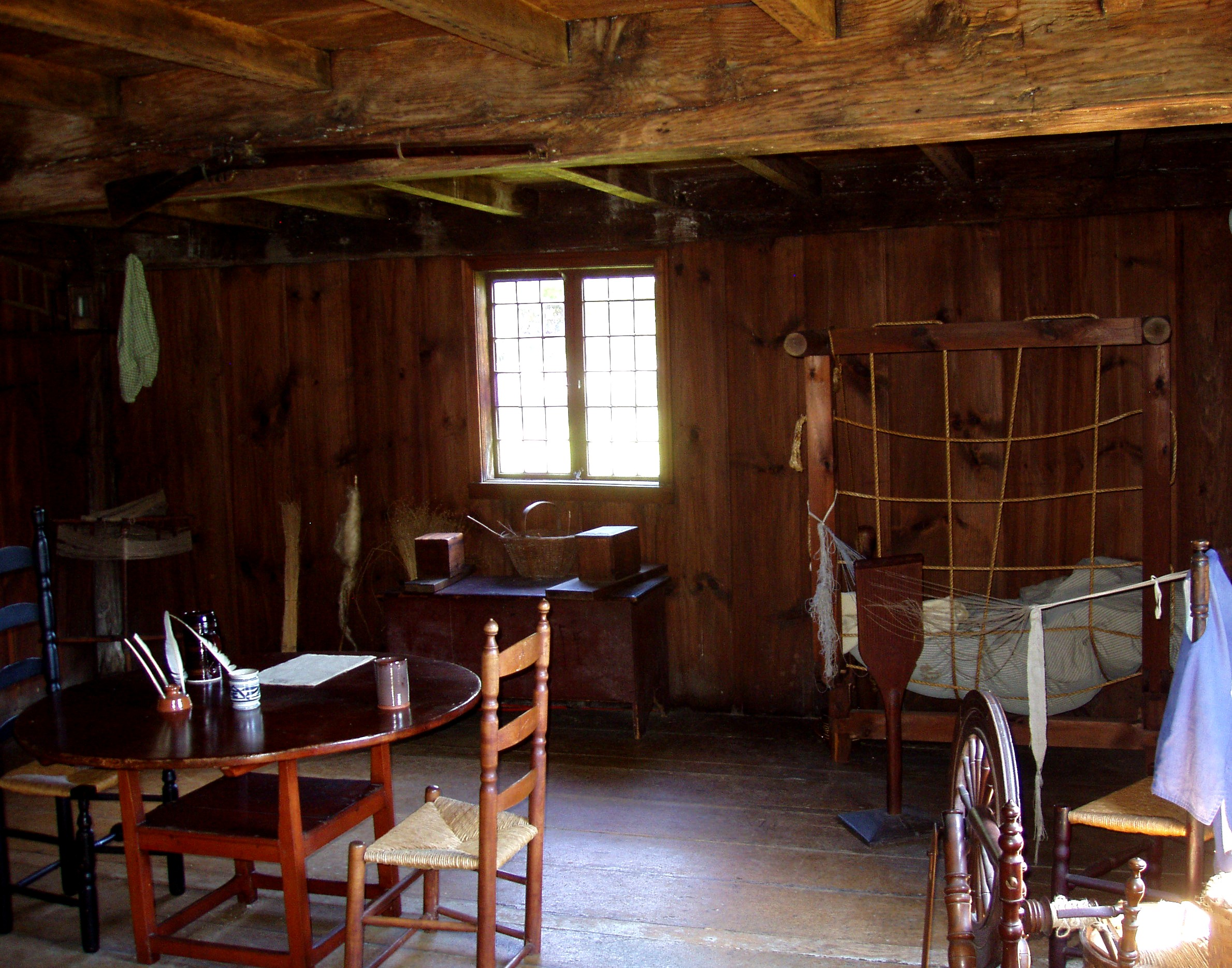
Interior view, first floor.

The Rebecca Nurse Homestead is centered on a historic colonial house built ca. 1700 located at 149 Pine Street, Danvers, Massachusetts. It had many additions through the years, eventually being historically restored and turned into a museum in 1909. Today it is owned and operated by the Danvers Alarm List Company, a volunteer non-profit organization of Revolutionary War reenactors, and is part of the Salem Village Historic District. It is named in honor of resident Rebecca Nurse an elderly woman accused and executed in the Salem witch trials of 1692.

== Description ==
The house was built ca. 1700 as a two-story First Period structure with central entrance and chimney. A lean-to with kitchen was added sometime before 1720; additional extensions were made in approximately 1750, 1850, and in the early 1900s. The house remained a private residence until 1907, when it was acquired and extensively restored by the Rebecca Nurse Memorial Association. In 1926 the Association donated the house to the Society for the Preservation of New England Antiquities. In 1981 it was transferred to the Danvers Alarm List Company, an organization for the reenactment of colonial period history.

Rebecca Nurse, convicted and executed in the Salem Witch Trials (1692), was the most notable resident of the home. She was 71 years old at death. Her great-grandson Francis Nurse later occupied the house, marching from it to the Battle of Lexington and Concord in Captain John Putnam's Danvers militia. Francis had married Eunice Putnam in the 1750s and later the Putnam family purchased the property in 1784, and remained residents until 1905.

Today four of the older rooms in the house are open to the public, including the original "great hall", sleeping "chamber", "lean-to" and "parlor". They have been historically restored and are augmented with period furnishings.

The grounds (27 acres) also contain a variety of outbuildings. One contains the internal structure salvaged from the circa 1681 home of Dr. Zerubabel Endecott, son of Governor John Endecott, before it was demolished in 1973. Details of its internal construction may be readily seen. A good reconstruction of the earliest Salem Village Meetinghouse is also on the grounds and may be toured. It was built in 1984 for the film Three Sovereigns for Sarah.

The grounds also contain the Nurse Burial Ground, a shoemaker's shed, and a dairy shed.

In 1885, Nurse's descendants, members of the First Church of Danvers (originally known as The Church of Christ in Salem Village), and local townspeople, dedicated the Rebecca Nurse Monument in her memory. The first memorial to anyone accused of witchcraft in North America, the granite obelisk bears an inscription by poet John Greenleaf Whittier, who lived nearby at that time. At a ceremony related to the 300th anniversary of the trials in 1992, the remains of George Jacobs were reinterred in the Nurse Burial Ground. He was another victim of the accusations who was executed and lived a short distance away.

== See also ==
- List of historic houses in Massachusetts
