= Sarah Cloyce =

American accused of witchcraft

Sarah Cloys/Cloyce (alt. Cloys/Cloyes; née Towne; c. 1641 – 1703) was among the many accused during Salem Witch Trials including two of her older sisters, Rebecca Nurse and Mary Eastey, who were both executed. Cloys/Cloyce was about 50 years old at the time and was held without bail in cramped prisons for many months before her release.

== Background ==
She was the daughter of William and Joanna Towne, who had emigrated to Salem from Great Yarmouth in England about 1630. Sarah, who was probably the youngest of their eight children, married firstly to Edmund Bridges, by whom she had six children, and secondly to Peter Cloys/Cloyce (later Cloys/Cloyes), a widower, by whom she had three more children.

== Salem Witch Trials ==
On Sacrament Day in the spring of 1692, covenanted church member Sarah Cloys/Cloyce (Sister #11) walked out of the Salem Village meetinghouse soon after the pastor Samuel Parris (Brother #1) announced that the Biblical text would be John Chapter 6 verse 70, "Have not I chosen you twelve, and one is a devil." Sarah reportedly allowed the door to slam behind her. Her departure was interpreted by some as an overt act of protest and solidarity with her sister, Rebecca Nurse (a covenanted member of another church near the harbor in Salem Town), who had recently been accused of witchcraft and committed to jail. Sarah's husband and fellow covenanted church member Peter Cloys/Cloyce (Brother #7) had signed an early statement of support for Rebecca Nurse.

Soon, Cloys/Cloyce's name began to surface among the accusers including Abigail Williams, the 11-year-old niece of Parris, and 16-year-old Mary Walcott. An official complaint on behalf of the accusers was filed by Parris's close neighbors Jonathan Walcott and Nathaniel Ingersoll (Brother #6). Ingersoll was a senior deacon of the church; the other was Edward Putnam.

On April 11, 1692, Sarah Cloys/Cloyce was interrogated in public and maintained her innocence. The first accuser questioned that day was an enslaved person owned by Parris and referred to as John Indian: "When did I hurt thee?" Sarah asked. "A great many times," he said."Oh you are a grievous liar", Sarah responded. Abigail Williams was also questioned. Sarah was committed to jail without bail and soon transferred to Boston prison until June 19 when she was transferred back to a jail in Ipswich. Another sister Mary Eastey was also accused and arrested. Sarah and her sisters repeatedly petitioned the court for an opportunity to present evidence which supported her innocence, and to exclude spectral evidence (testimony that the spirit of someone did something).

Rebecca Nurse was executed in July and Mary Eastey was executed in September, so that of the three sisters, only Sarah Cloys/Cloyce managed to survive until the witch trials were ended by Governor Phips in 1693. In September, there was an additional accusation against Sarah coming from her niece, Rebecca Towne, daughter of Cloyce's late brother, Edmund Towne. On September 9, 1692, an indictment was made out against Sarah, "for certain detestable arts called witchcraft and sorceries, wickedly, maliciously and feloniously hath used practiced and exercised... in, upon and against one Rebecca Towne of Topsfield...and also for sundry other acts of witchcraft."

== Last years ==
After Governor William Phips dissolved the Court of Oyer and Terminer in October 1692, a new Superior Court of Judicature was formed in December and given instructions to disregard all "spectral evidence" or testimony of the afflicted. In January 1693, this new court dismissed the charges against Sarah, the jurors marking the indictment "ignoramus", literally meaning "we do not know." After paying her prison fees, she and her husband moved to Framingham where the house still stands. Her husband immediately (February 8, 1693) began working with several other church members ("aggrieved brethren") including a son of Rebecca Nurse, in bringing action against Parris, hoping for a full apology, or failing that, to have him dismissed from their church.

In April 1695, the aggrieved brethren failed to get Parris ousted by a Council of neighboring churches moderated by Increase Mather, and including his prolific and witch-phobic son Cotton Mather.

Later that year, Peter Cloys/Cloyce asked Parris for a dismission so that he and his wife could move their membership to a Church in Marlborough (West of Framingham).

Other "aggrieved brethren" continued their fight and in 1697 were successful in bringing a civil case on behalf of the Village and Parris was removed from their church.

Sarah spent the last years of her life trying to clear her sisters' names. After her death, her two sisters were eventually cleared of all charges. In 1706, Ann Putnam Jr. confessed to having falsely accused Sarah Cloys/Cloyce and her sisters. And particularly, as I was a chief instrument of accusing Goodwife Nurse and her two sisters, I desire to lie in the dust, and to be humbled for it, in that I was a cause, with others, of so sad a calamity to them and their families; for which cause I desire to lie in the dust, and earnestly beg forgiveness of God, and from all those unto whom I have given just cause of sorrow and offense, whose relations were taken away or accused.

== In popular culture ==
In the short story, Young Goodman Brown by Nathaniel Hawthorne (himself a descendant of one of the Salem witch trial magistrates), a social criticism of Puritan culture, a character named Goody Cloyse addresses the devil, confessing to practicing witchcraft. It is a shock to the protagonist (Brown) as she had taught him his catechism in his youth. She makes a reference to "...that unhanged witch, Goody Cory...", a possible reference to Martha Corey, who actually was hanged as a witch in 1692.

Sarah Cloys/Cloyce/Cloyes is the protagonist and narrator of the 1985 public television miniseries chronicling the trials American Playhouse: Three Sovereigns for Sarah. She was portrayed by the English actress Vanessa Redgrave.
