= Rebecca Nurse =

Convicted witch in Salem, Massachusetts (1621–1692)

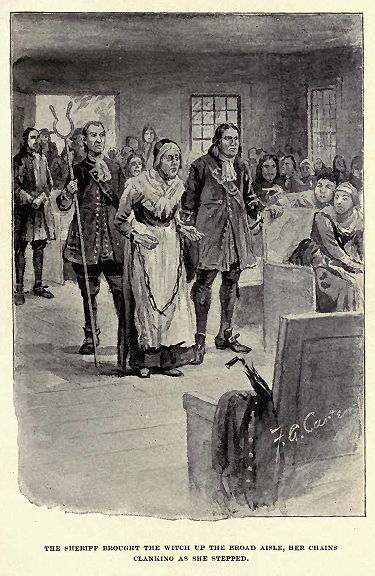
- A fanciful representation of Rebecca Nurse's trial from The Witch of Salem, or Credulity Run Mad by John R. Musick
- Born: Rebecca Towne; February 13, 1621; Great Yarmouth, England
- Died: July 19, 1692 (aged 71); Salem Village, Province of Massachusetts Bay
- Cause of death: Execution by hanging
- Occupation: Housewife
- Known for: Convicted of witchcraft during the Salem Witch Trials
- Spouse: Francis Nurse (or Nourse)
- Children: 9
- Relatives: Mary Eastey (sister); Sarah Cloyce (sister)

Rebecca Nurse (née Towne; February 13, 1621 – July 19, 1692) was a woman who was accused of witchcraft and executed by hanging in New England during the Salem Witch Trials of 1692. She was fully exonerated less than twenty years later.

She was the wife of Francis Nurse, and had several children. Rebecca was a well-respected member of the community. She was tried and convicted in the spring and summer of 1692 and executed on July 19. Her married sisters Mary Eastey and Sarah Cloyce were also accused. Mary was convicted and executed, but Sarah managed to survive.

== Early life ==
The daughter of William (c. 1598–1672) and Joanna Towne (c. 1595/99–1682) (née Blessing), Rebecca Nurse was born February 13, 1621 in Great Yarmouth, England. She was baptised February 21, 1621. Her family emigrated to the Massachusetts Bay Colony, settling in Salem, although most of the Towne family would eventually move inland to Topsfield. Rebecca had three sisters, Susan (baptized October 26, 1625; died July 29, 1630), Mary (baptized August 24, 1634; executed 1692) and Sarah. She also had three brothers, Edmund (baptized June 1628), Jacob (baptized March 11, 1631 or 1632) and Joseph (born c. 1639).

Sometime around 1644, she married Francis Nurse (or Nourse; 1618–1695), who was also born in England. Her husband was a "tray maker" by trade, who likely made many other wooden household items. Due to the rarity of such household goods, such artisans were esteemed. They raised their family in Salem village (modern day Danvers, Massachusetts). The couple had eight children: four daughters and four sons. Their names were John Nurse (born 1645), Rebecca Nurse (born 1647), Samuel Nurse (born 1649), Elizabeth Nurse (born 1655 or 1656), Mary Nurse (born 1657 – 28 June 1749), Francis Nurse (born 1660 or 1661), Sarah Nurse (born 1662) and Benjamin Nurse (born in 1665 or 1666). In 1672, Francis Nurse served as Salem's Constable. It was later written that Rebecca had "acquired a reputation for exemplary piety that was virtually unchallenged in the community," making her one of the "unlikely" persons to be accused of witchcraft.

In 1678 they were offered the opportunity to lease-to-own a 300-acre (120 ha) farm in the rural village area of Salem (today Danvers, Massachusetts), originally a part of a grant given to Townsend Bishop in 1636. This farm still exists, and is today preserved as the Rebecca Nurse Homestead. Rebecca and Francis frequented the Salem Village meeting house and Francis was quite active in the community becoming well respected in Salem Village; he was often asked to serve as mediator to help settle matters. The Nurses officially remained members of the Salem Towne church until their deaths, despite being very active within the village community. In 1699 the Nurses' children were able to officially purchase the farm outright and remained for multiple generations.

== Accusation and trial ==
On March 23, 1692, a warrant was issued for her arrest based upon accusations made by Edward and John Putnam. Upon hearing of the accusations, the frail 71-year-old Nurse, often described as an invalid, said, "I am innocent as the child unborn, but surely, what sin hath God found out in me unrepented of, that He should lay such an affliction on me in my old age."

A public outcry greeted the accusations made against her, as she was considered to be a woman of very pious character, who lived in amity with her neighbours, and had a reputation for benevolence. Her neighbor Sarah Holton, accused Rebecca of acting quite unreasonably in a quarrel over some trespassing pigs and cursing her husband to his death. Sarah Holton’s husband Benjamin Holton started going into convulsions the night after the confrontation, and then died weeks after Rebecca‘s confrontation with them about their pigs. Sarah Holten believed that Rebecca placed a curse on her husband but later thought better of it and was one of the first to speak about the injustice of the trials. Thirty-nine of the most prominent members of the community signed a petition on Nurse's behalf. At age 71, she was one of the oldest accused. The examining magistrates, John Hathorne and Jonathan Corwin, who normally regarded the guilt of the accused as self-evident, took a notably different attitude in Rebecca's case, as they also did in the case of her sister Mary Eastey. They told Rebecca openly that if she was innocent, they prayed that God would show her innocence, for "it is a sad thing to see church members accused". Hathorne was no doubt influenced by the fact that his sister Elizabeth Porter was a close friend of Rebecca, and one of her staunchest defenders.

Her trial began on June 30, 1692. In accordance with the procedures at the time, Mrs. Nurse, like others accused of witchcraft, represented herself since she was not allowed to have a lawyer. By dint of her respectability, many members of the community testified on her behalf, including her family members. Often the "afflicted" would break into fits and claim Nurse was tormenting them. Such so-called "spectral evidence" was allowed into the trial to show that Satan was afflicting others in the community at the behest of the accused. In response to their outbursts Nurse stated, "I have got nobody to look to but God."

In the end, the jury ruled Nurse not guilty. Due to the public outcry and renewed fits and spasms by the "afflicted", the judges reviewed her case with the jury. One particular point was emphasized, and the jury requested a second chance of deliberation (a legal practice used in those days). The jury asked Rebecca to explain her remark that another accused witch, Deliverance Hobbs, was "of her company", the implication being that they had both signed a pact with the Devil. Fatally, Rebecca, who was hard of hearing, did not hear the question: she later explained to her children that she was referring to this woman as a fellow "accused" witch. However the jury had changed their verdict and sentenced Nurse to death on July 19, 1692.

== Death and aftermath ==
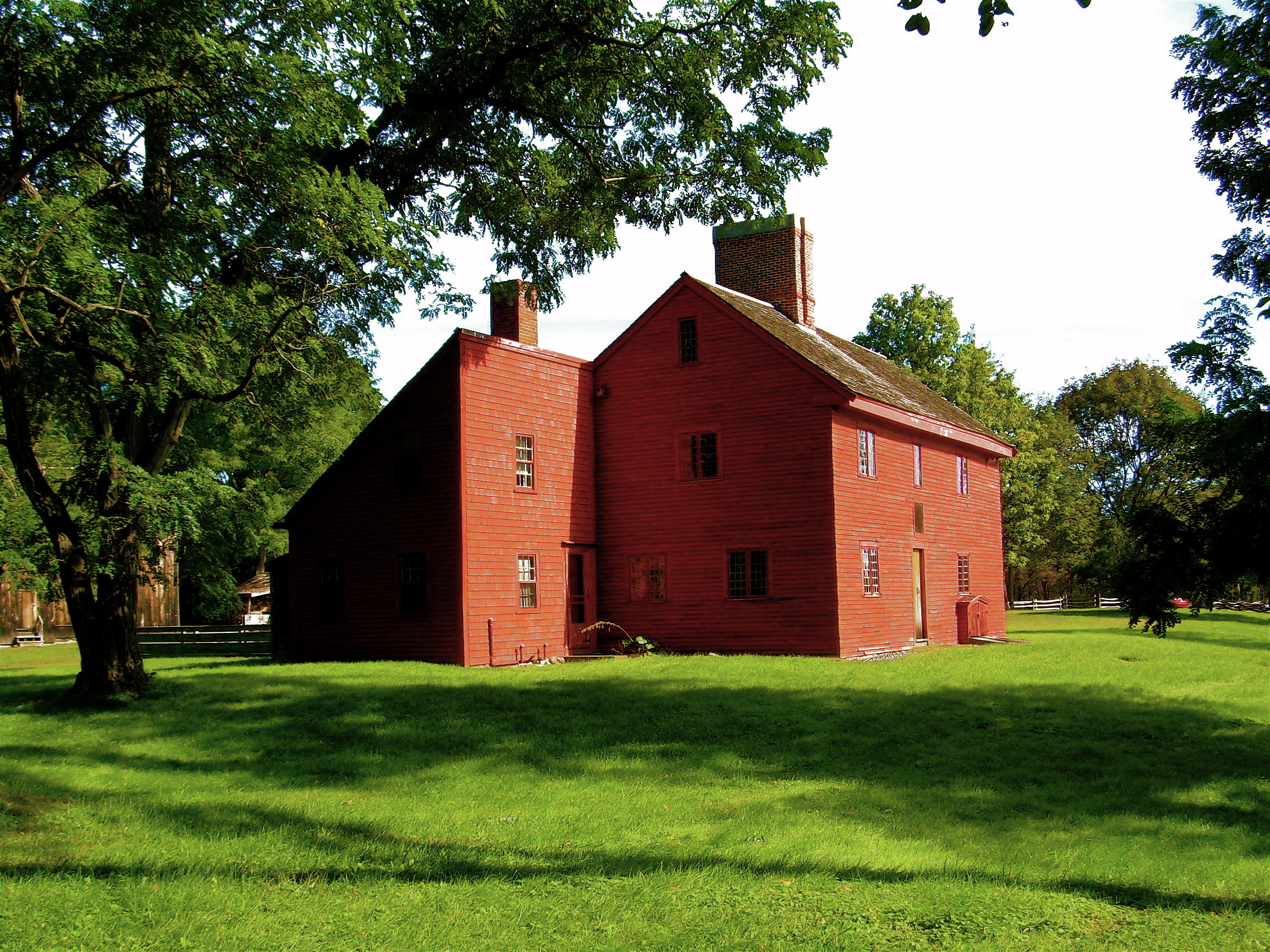
The Rebecca Nurse Homestead in 2006

Many people described Nurse as "the woman of self-dignity", due to her collected behavior on the gallows. As was the custom, after she was hanged, her body was buried in a shallow grave near the execution spot. They were considered unfit for a Christian burial in a churchyard. According to oral tradition, Nurse's family secretly returned after dark and dug up her body, which they interred properly on their family homestead. Although her exact resting place has never been confirmed her descendants erected a tall granite memorial in the family plot in 1885 at the Rebecca Nurse Homestead cemetery in Danvers (formerly Salem Village), Massachusetts. The inscription on the monument reads:

Rebecca Nurse, Yarmouth, England 1621. Salem, Mass., 1692.
O Christian Martyr who for Truth could die
When all about thee owned the hideous lie!
The world redeemed from Superstition's sway
Is breathing freer for thy sake today.
(From the poem "Christian Martyr," by John Greenleaf Whittier)

In 1706, her accuser, Ann Putnam, Jr., composed a confession in consultation with the Reverend Joseph Green, Samuel Parris's successor as minister of Salem's church. Green read Putnam's confession to the Salem Village congregation on 25 August, 1706, after which Putnam received Communion. She expressed great remorse for her role against Rebecca and her two sisters, Mary Eastey and Sarah Cloyce, in particular: "I desire to be humbled before God for that sad and humbling providence that befell my father's family in the year about '92; that I, then being in my childhood, should, by such a providence of God, be made an instrument for the accusing of several persons of a grievous crime, whereby their lives were taken away from them, whom now I have just grounds and good reason to believe they were innocent persons; and that it was a great delusion of Satan that deceived me in that sad time, whereby I justly fear I have been instrumental, with others, though ignorantly and unwittingly, to bring upon myself and this land the guilt of innocent blood; though what was said or done by me against any person I can truly and uprightly say, before God and man, I did it not out of any anger, malice, or ill-will to any person, for I had no such thing against one of them; but what I did was ignorantly, being deluded by Satan. And particularly, as I was a chief instrument of accusing of Goodwife Nurse and her two sisters, I desire to lie in the dust, and to be humbled for it, in that I was a cause, with others, of so sad a calamity to them and their families; for which cause I desire to lie in the dust, and earnestly beg forgiveness of God, and from all those unto whom I have given just cause of sorrow and offense, whose relations were taken away or accused."

Prior to the public reading, Rebecca Nurse's son Samuel Nurse had been consulted "as the representative of those who had suffered from her testimony", and he deemed her confession "to be satisfactory to him." By contrast, the Nurse family never forgave Samuel Parris, the village minister during the trials, whom they held personally to blame for their bereavement – one of Rebecca's sons stated, "We know not how to express the loss of such a mother in such a way" – and they did not rest until Parris was removed from office in 1697. In 1711, her children petitioned the government for a reversal of attainer and were granted compensation for Rebecca's wrongful death. In 1712, the Salem Towne church reversed the verdict of excommunication it had passed on her: "that it be no longer a reproach to her memory or an occasion of grief to her children".

In 1885, Nurse's descendants, members of the First Church of Danvers (originally known as The Church of Christ in Salem Village), and local townspeople, dedicated the Rebecca Nurse Monument in her memory. The first memorial to anyone accused of witchcraft in North America, the granite obelisk bears an inscription by poet John Greenleaf Whittier, who lived nearby at that time. In 1892, the community erected a second monument recognizing the 40 neighbors, led by Israel and Elizabeth (Hathorne) Porter, who took the risk of publicly supporting Nurse by signing a petition to the court on her behalf in 1692. One signer was General Israel Putnam's father.

The Nurse family remained in the home for many generations. Eventually the Nurse family homestead was sold to Phineas Putnam, a cousin of Rebecca's great-great-grandson Benjamin, in 1784. The Putnam family remained until about 1905. By 1909 the farm was saved by volunteers and turned into a historic house museum that includes the original house and cemetery, on 27 of the original 300 acres (1.2 km^{2}) of land.

In 2021, the 400th anniversary of Nurse's birth, the first full biography of her life was published, Daniel A. Gagnon's A Salem Witch: The Trial, Execution, and Exoneration of Rebecca Nurse.

== In popular culture ==
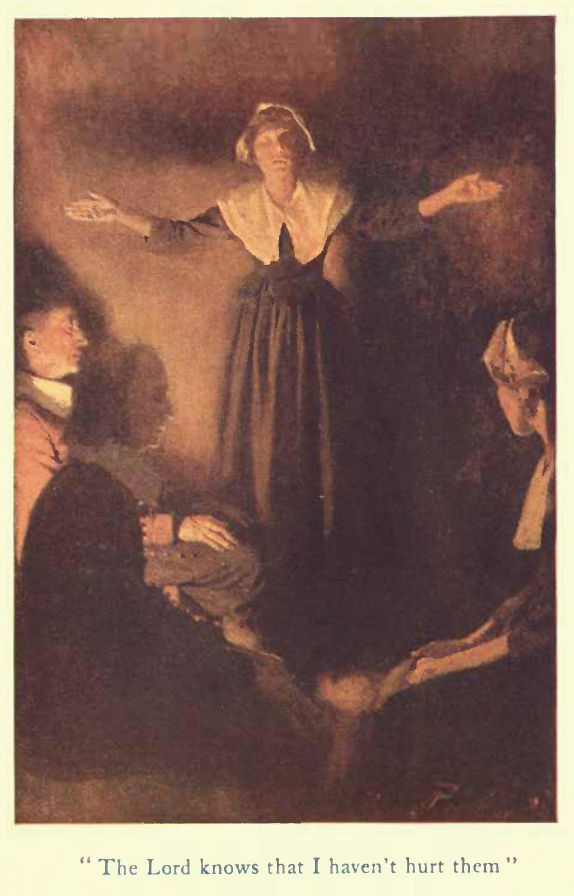
A conceptualized drawing of Rebecca Nurse from A tale of old Salem, by Henry Peterson

Nurse's trial was featured in an episode of the CBS radio program CBS Is There, which aired on July 28, 1947.

Rebecca Nurse is a central character in Arthur Miller's play The Crucible. In the original Broadway production in 1953 she was played by Jean Adair, who died shortly afterwards. This work was adapted for films in 1957 and 1996; Nurse was portrayed by actresses Marguerite Coutan-Lambert and Elizabeth Lawrence, respectively. In the first and much acclaimed television adaption by the BBC in 1980 she was played by Ann Dyson.

She is likewise a major character in Robert Ward’s Pulitzer Prize-winning operatic adaptation of Miller's play.

She inspired other dramatic treatments of the Salem Witch Trials. The PBS film Three Sovereigns for Sarah features Vanessa Redgrave as one of Rebecca Nurse's sisters, Sarah Cloyce; although accused, she escaped execution. The film depicts Nurse and her family members as the main characters. Rebecca was portrayed by actress Shirley MacLaine in the 2002 CBS miniseries, Salem Witch Trials.

Nurse was the subject of Lectures on Witchcraft by Charles W. Upham. She is also mentioned in passing in Robin Cook's suspense novel Acceptable Risk. A fictional character believes her to be pious and registers surprise when seeing Nurse on her way to her execution.. Nurse can also be found as a supporting character in Katherine Howe's historical fiction, The Physick Book of Deliverance Dane. In Howe's novel, Nurse is used as a character foil for the main character, Deliverance Dane. Rebecca's main appearances and dialogue can be found during the scenes of the sentencing and execution of those accused of witchcraft. Her trial and death are elements of the Doctor Who novel The Witch Hunters.

== Notable descendants ==
Rebecca Nurse is the ancestor of several notable people, including Mitt Romney, Zach Braff, and Lucille Ball.
