= Frederick, Maryland =

- City
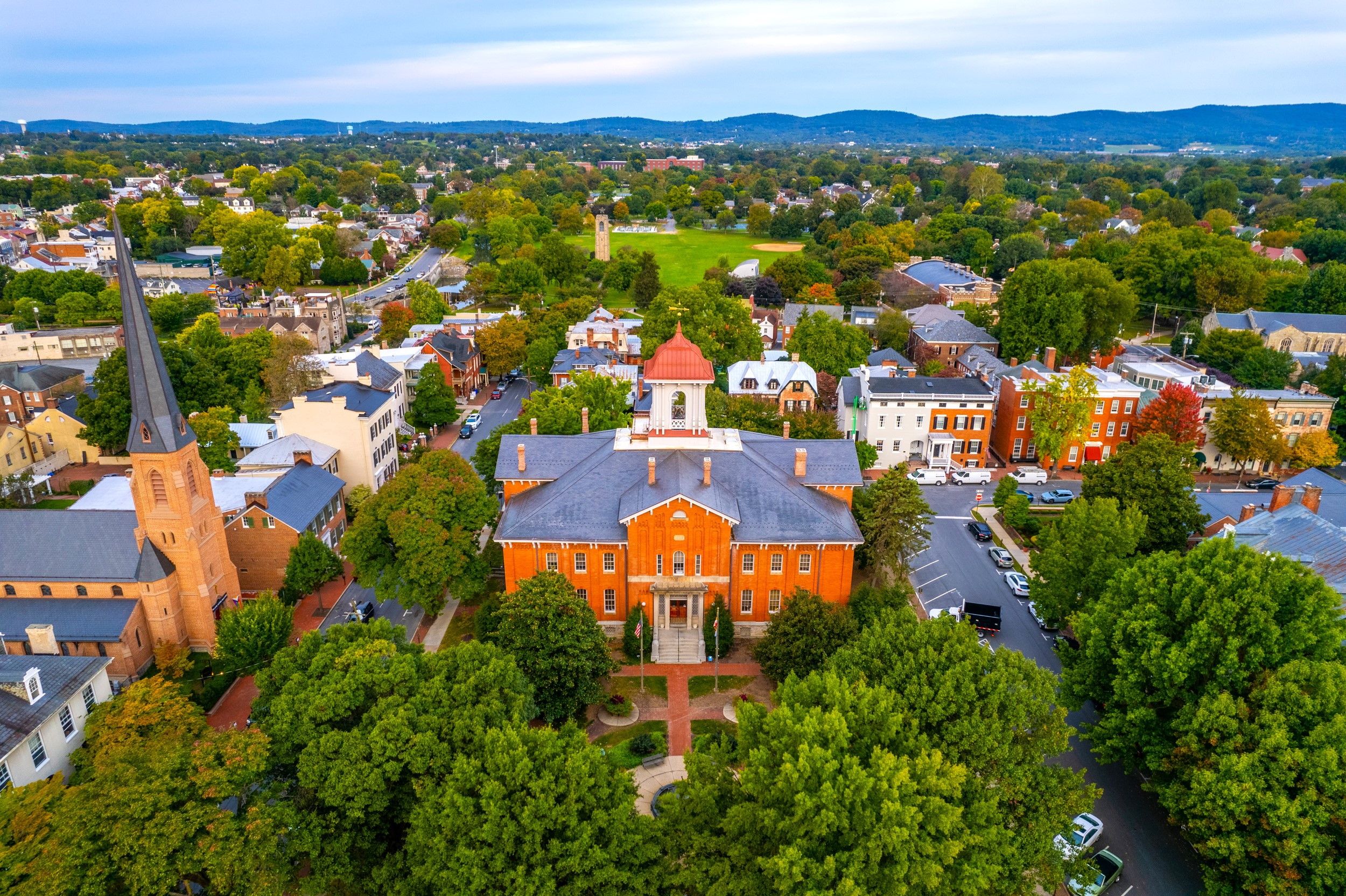
- Downtown Frederick's City Hall in 2022

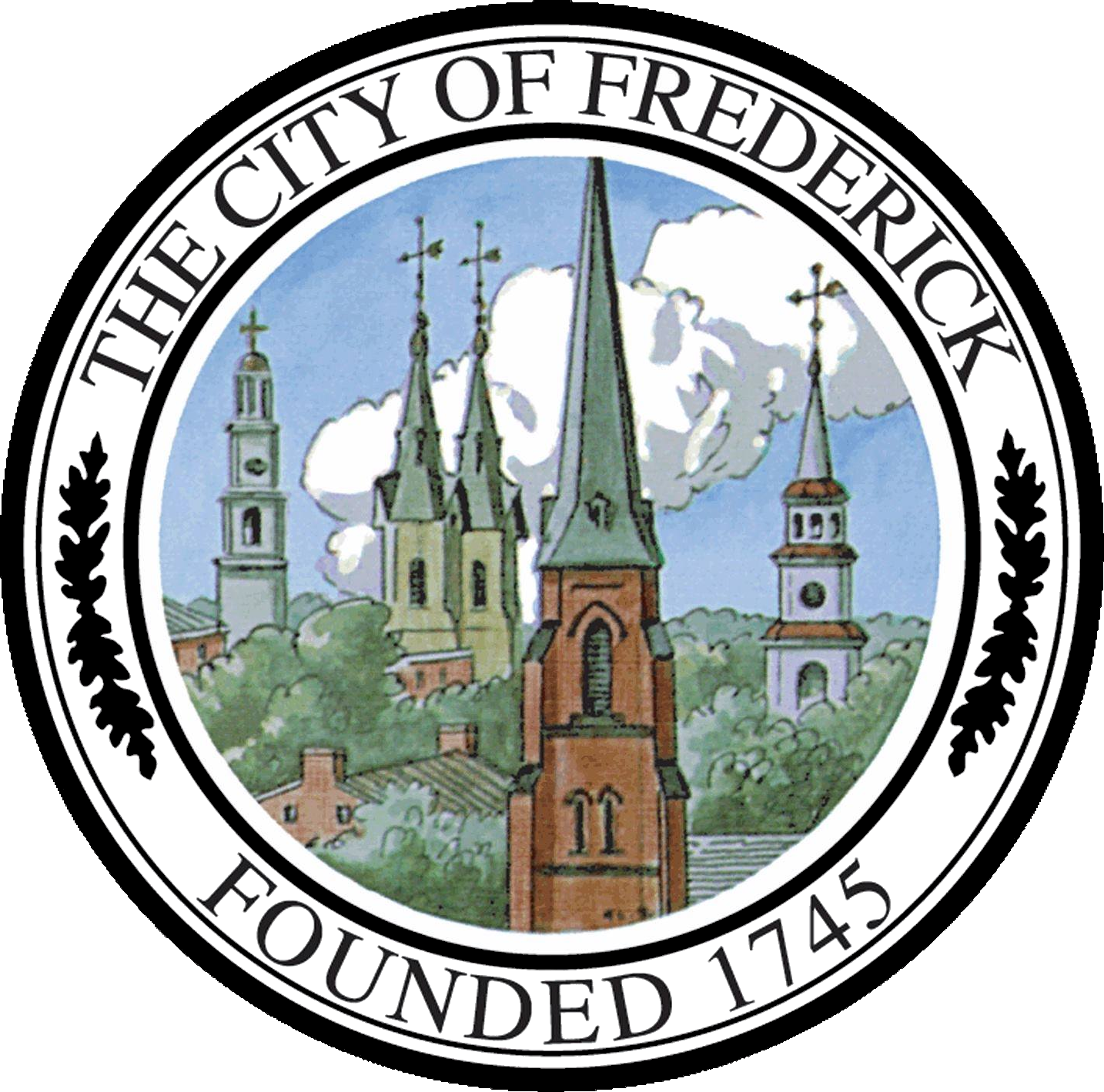
- Seal
- Nickname: "The City of Clustered Spires"
- Motto: "Join the Story!"
- Interactive map of Frederick, Maryland
- Location within Maryland Location within the United States
- Coordinates: 39°25′52″N 77°23′50″W
- Country: United States
- State: Maryland
- County: Frederick
- Founded: 1745

Area
  - City: 24.56 sq mi (63.61 km^{2})
  - Land: 24.38 sq mi (63.14 km^{2})
  - Water: 0.18 sq mi (0.47 km^{2})
- Elevation: 341 ft (104 m)

Population (2020)
  - City: 78,171
  - Estimate (2025): 92,089
  - Rank: US: 452nd MD: 2nd
  - Density: 3,264.3/sq mi (1,260.35/km^{2})
  - Urban: 141,576 (US: 230th)
- Demonym(s): Fredericktonian; Fredneck (colloquial)
- Time zone: UTC−5 (EST)
  - Summer (DST): UTC−4 (EDT)
- ZIP Codes: 21701–21709
- Area codes: 301, 240
- FIPS code: 24-30325
- GNIS feature ID: 2390588
- Highways: I-70, I-270, US 15, US 40, US 340, MD 80, [MD 144, MD 355
- Website: www.cityoffrederickmd.gov

Frederick is a city in and the county seat of Frederick County, Maryland, United States. Frederick's population was 78,171 people as of the 2020 census, making it the second-largest incorporated city in Maryland behind Baltimore. It is a part of the Washington metropolitan area and the greater Washington–Baltimore combined statistical area.

The city is located at an important crossroads at the intersection of a major north–south Native American trail and east–west routes to the Chesapeake Bay, both at Baltimore and what became Washington, D.C., and across the Appalachian Mountains to the Ohio River watershed.

Frederick Municipal Airport accommodates general aviation, and Fort Detrick, a U.S. Army bioscience and communications research installation and Frederick County's largest employer.

== History ==
=== Pre-colonization ===
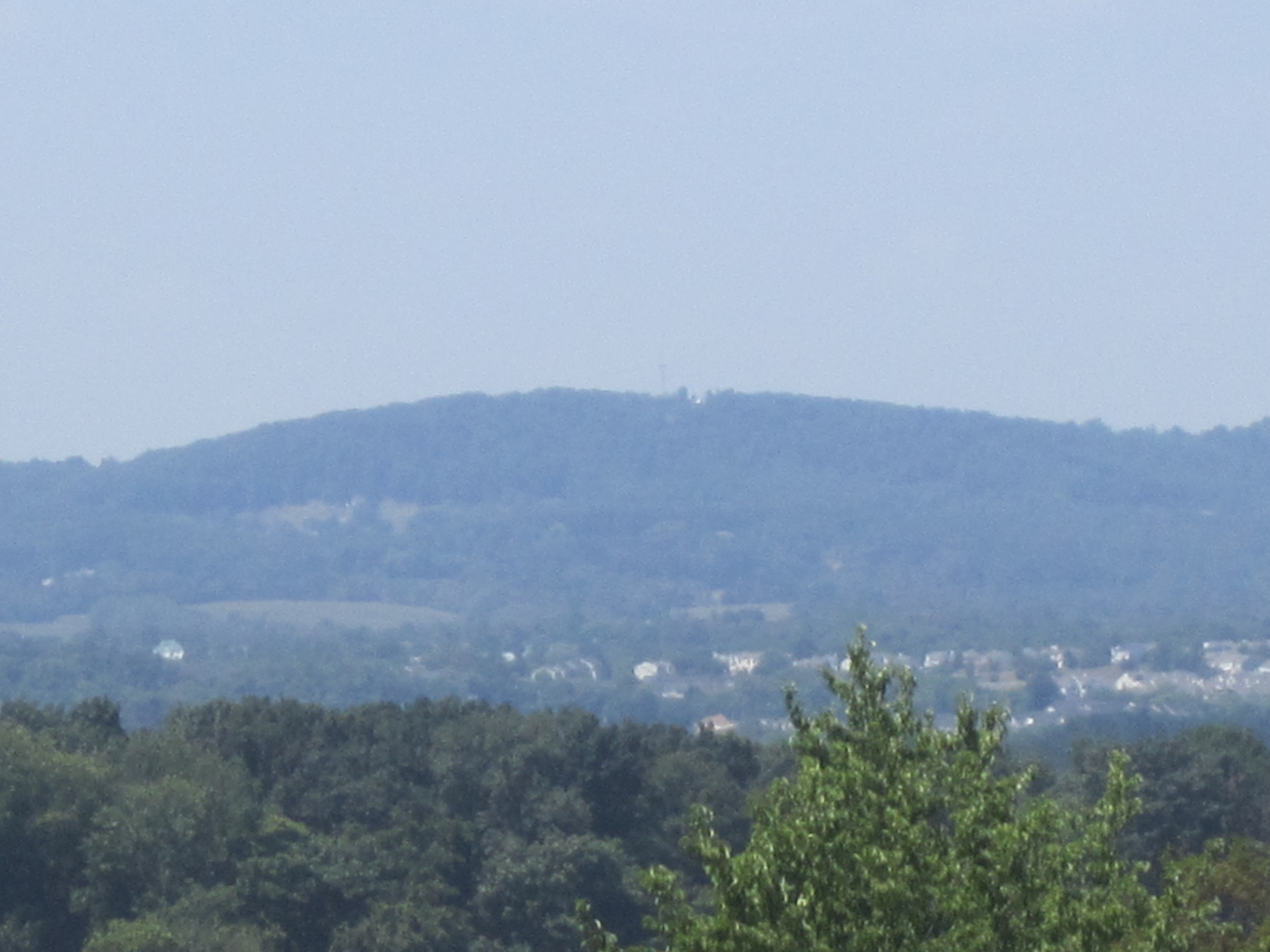
Catoctin Mountain, located north of Frederick

Located where Catoctin Mountain, the easternmost ridge of the Blue Ridge Mountains, meets the rolling hills of the Piedmont region, the Frederick area became a crossroads long before European explorers and traders arrived.

=== 18th century ===
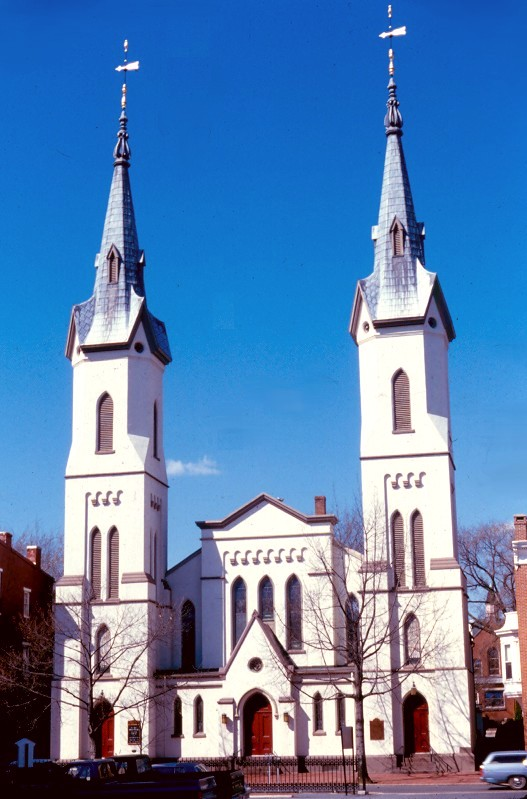
The Evangelical Lutheran Church, a Lutheran church in Frederick, built in 1752

The earliest European settlement was slightly north of Frederick in Monocacy, Maryland. Monocacy was founded before 1730 (when the Indian trail became a wagon road) and was abandoned before the American Revolutionary War, likely due to the river's periodic flooding, hostilities predating the French and Indian War, or simply Frederick's better location with easier access to the Potomac River near its confluence with the Monocacy.

Daniel Dulany, a land speculator, laid out what was initially called Frederick Town by 1745. Three years earlier, All Saints Church had been founded on a hilltop near a warehouse/trading post. Sources disagree as to which Frederick the town was named for, but the likeliest candidates are Frederick Calvert, 6th Baron Baltimore (one of the proprietors of Maryland), Frederick Louis, Prince of Wales, and Frederick the Great, King of Prussia.

In 1748, Frederick County was formed by carving off a section of Prince George's County. Frederick Town (now Frederick) was made the county seat of Frederick County. The county originally extended to the Appalachian mountains (areas further west being disputed between the colonies of Virginia and Pennsylvania until 1789). The current town's first house was built by a young German Reformed schoolmaster from the Rhineland Palatinate named Johann Thomas Schley (died 1790), who led a party of immigrants (including his wife, Maria Von Winz) to the Maryland colony. The Palatinate settlers bought land from Dulany on the banks of Carroll Creek, and Schley's house stood at the northwest corner of Middle Alley and East Patrick Street into the 20th century. Schley's settlers also founded a German Reformed Church, now known as Evangelical Reformed Church, and part of the UCC. Probably the oldest house still standing in Frederick today is Schifferstadt, built in 1756 by German settler Joseph Brunner and now the Schifferstadt Architectural Museum. The spire of the church and its clock tower were completed in 1763 and will undergo a restoration project in 2025.

Schley's group was among the many Pennsylvania Dutch, Scots-Irish, French, and later Irish, who migrated south and westward in the late 18th century. Frederick was an important stop along the migration route that became known as the Great Wagon Road, which came down from Gettysburg, Pennsylvania and Emmitsburg, Maryland and continued south following the Great Appalachian Valley through Winchester and Roanoke, Virginia. Another important route continued along the Potomac River from near Frederick, to Hagerstown, where it split. One branch crossed the Potomac River near Martinsburg, West Virginia and continued down into the Shenandoah valley. The other continued west to Cumberland, Maryland, and ultimately crossed the Appalachian Mountains into the watershed of the Ohio River. Thus, British General Edward Braddock marched his troops (including the youthful George Washington) west in 1755 through Frederick on the way to their fateful ambush near Fort Duquesne (later Fort Pitt, then Pittsburgh) during the French and Indian War. However, the British after the Proclamation of 1763 restricted that westward migration route until after the American Revolutionary War. Other westward migrants continued south from Frederick to Roanoke along the Great Wagon Road, crossing the Appalachians into Kentucky and Tennessee at the Cumberland Gap near the Virginia/North Carolina border.

Other German settlers in Frederick were Evangelical Lutherans, led by Rev. Henry Muhlenberg. They moved their mission church from Monocacy to what became a large complex a few blocks further down Church Street from the Anglicans and the German Reformed Church. Methodist missionary Robert Strawbridge, who accepted an invitation to preach at Frederick town in 1770, and Francis Asbury, who arrived two years later, both helped found a congregation which became Calvary Methodist Church, worshipping in a log building from 1792 (although superseded by larger buildings in 1841, 1865, 1910 and 1930). Frederick also had a Catholic mission, to which Rev. Jean DuBois was assigned in 1792, which became St. John the Evangelist Church (built in 1800).

To control this crossroads during the American Revolution, the British garrisoned a German Hessian regiment in the town; the war (the stone, L-shaped "Hessian Barracks" still stand).

=== 19th century ===
As the county seat for Western Maryland, Frederick not only was an important market town but also the seat of justice. Although Montgomery County and Washington County were split off from Frederick County in 1776, Frederick remained the seat of the county, which is the largest by land area in Maryland. Important lawyers who practiced in Frederick included John Hanson, Francis Scott Key and Roger B. Taney.

Frederick was also known during the 19th century for its religious pluralism, with one of its main thoroughfares, Church Street, hosting about a half dozen major churches. In 1793, All Saints Church hosted the first confirmation of an American citizen, by the newly consecrated Episcopal Bishop Thomas Claggett. That original colonial building was replaced in 1814 by a brick classical revival structure. It still stands today, although the principal worship space has become an even larger brick gothic church joining it at the back and facing Frederick's City Hall (so the parish remains the oldest Episcopal Church in western Maryland). The main Catholic church, dedicated to St. John the Evangelist, was built in 1800, then rebuilt in 1837 (across the street) one block north of Church Street on East Second Street, where it still stands along with a school and convent established by the Visitation Sisters. The stone Evangelical Lutheran Church of 1752 was also rebuilt and enlarged in 1825, then replaced by the current twin-spired structure in 1852.

The oldest African-American church in the town is Asbury United Methodist Church, founded as the Old Hill Church, a mixed congregation in 1818. It became an African-American congregation in 1864, renamed Asbury Methodist Episcopal Church in 1870, and built its current building on All Saints Street in 1921.

Together, these churches dominated the town, set against the backdrop of the first ridge of the Appalachians at Catoctin Mountain. The abolitionist poet John Greenleaf Whittier later immortalized this view of Frederick in his poem to "Barbara Fritchie": "The clustered spires of Frederick stand/Green-walled by the hills of Maryland."

When U.S. President Thomas Jefferson commissioned National Road from Baltimore toward St. Louis, eventually built to Vandalia, then the state capital of Illinois, National Pike ran through Frederick along Patrick Street; it later became U.S. Route 40. Frederick's Jacob Engelbrecht corresponded with Jefferson in 1824 and received a transcribed psalm from Jefferson in return. Engelbrecht kept a diary from 1819 through 1878, which remains an important first-hand account of 19th century life on National Road. An important house remaining from this era is the Tyler Spite House, built in 1814 at 112 W. Church Street by a local doctor to prevent the city from extending Record Street south through his land to meet West Patrick Street.

Frederick also became one of the new nation's leading mining counties in the early 19th century. It exported gold, copper, limestone, marble, iron, and other minerals. As early as the American Revolution, Catoctin Furnace near Thurmont became an important source of iron production. Other mining areas split off into Washington County, Maryland and Allegheny County, Maryland but continued to ship their ore through Frederick to Eastern cities and ports.

Frederick had easy access to the Chesapeake and Ohio Canal, which began operations in 1831 and continued hauling freight until 1924. Also in 1831, the Baltimore and Ohio Railroad (B&O) completed its Frederick Branch line from the Frederick (or Monocacy) Junction off the main Western Line from Baltimore to Harpers Ferry, Cumberland, and the Ohio River. The railroad reached Chicago and St. Louis by the 1850s.

==== Civil War ====
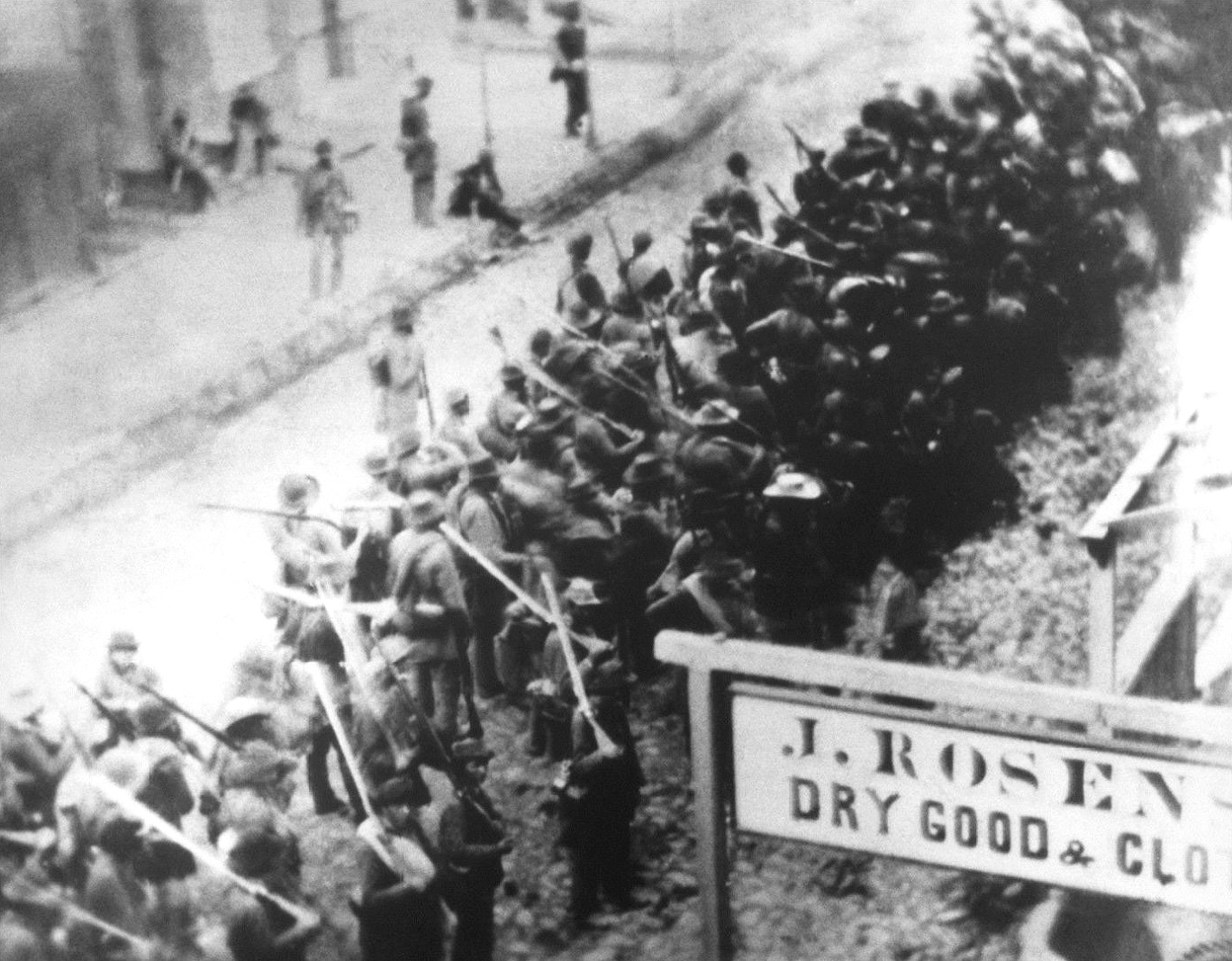
Confederate troops marching south on North Market Street in Frederick during the American Civil War

Frederick became Maryland's capital city briefly in 1861, as the legislature moved from Annapolis to vote on the secession question. President Lincoln arrested several members, and the assembly was unable to convene a quorum to vote on secession.

As a major crossroads, Frederick, like Winchester, Virginia, and Martinsburg, West Virginia, saw considerable action during the American Civil War. Slaves also escaped from or through Frederick (since Maryland was still a "slave state" although it had not seceded) to join the Union forces, work against the Confederacy and seek freedom. During the Maryland campaigns, both Union and Confederate troops marched through the city. Frederick also hosted several hospitals to nurse the wounded from those battles, as is related in the National Museum of Civil War Medicine on East Patrick Street.

A legend related by John Greenleaf Whittier claimed that Frederick's Pennsylvania Dutch women (including Barbara Fritchie who reportedly waved a flag) booed the Confederates in September 1862, as General Stonewall Jackson led his light infantry division through Frederick on his way to the battles of Crampton's, Fox's and Turner's Gaps on South Mountain and Antietam near Sharpsburg. Union Major General Jesse L. Reno's IX Corps followed Jackson's men through the city a few days later on the way to the Battle of South Mountain, where Reno died. The sites of the battles are due west of the city along the National Road, west of Burkittsville. Confederate troops under Jackson and Walker unsuccessfully attempted to halt the Federal army's westward advance into the Cumberland Valley and towards Sharpsburg. Gathland State Park has the War Correspondents' Memorial stone arch erected by reporter/editor George Alfred Townsend (1841–1914). The 1889 memorial commemorating Major General Reno and the Union soldiers of his IX Corps is on Reno Monument Road west of Middletown, just below the summit of Fox's Gap, as is a 1993 memorial to slain Confederate Brig. Gen. Samuel Garland Jr., and the North Carolina troops who held the line.

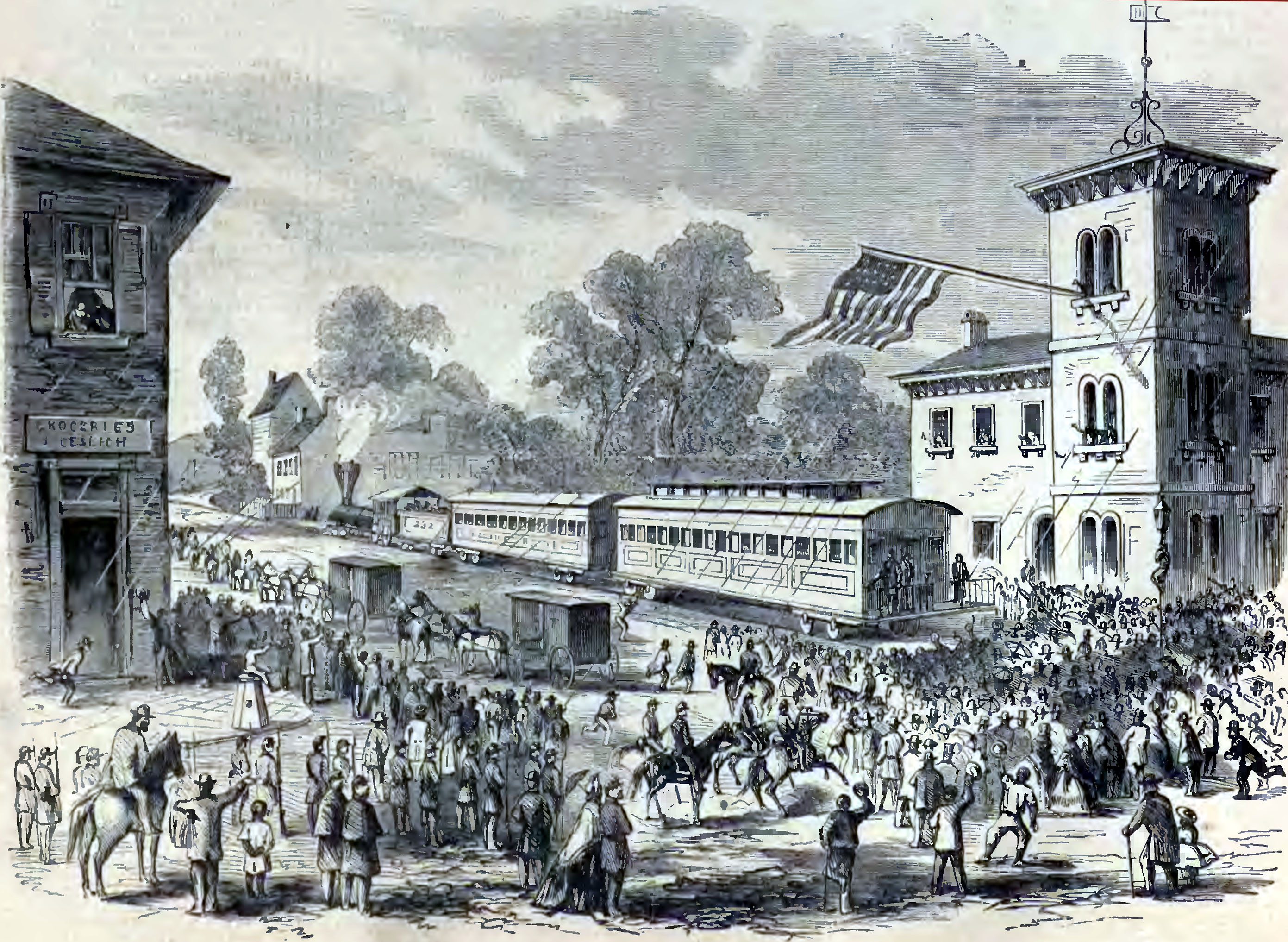
President Abraham Lincoln giving a speech in Frederick on October 4, 1862

President Abraham Lincoln, on his way to visit Gen. George McClellan after the Battle of South Mountain and the Battle of Antietam, delivered a short speech at what was then the B&O Railroad depot at the current intersection of East All Saints and South Market Streets. A plaque commemorates the speech (at what is today the Frederick Community Action Agency, a Social Services office).

At the Prospect Hall mansion off Jefferson Street to Buckeystown Pike near what is now Butterfly Lane, in the early morning hours of June 28, 1863, a messenger arrived from President Abraham Lincoln and General-in-Chief Henry Halleck, informing General George Meade that he would be replacing General Joseph Hooker after the latter's disastrous performance at Chancellorsville in May. The Army of the Potomac camped around the Prospect Hall property for the several days as skirmishers pursued Lee's Confederate Army of Northern Virginia before Gettysburg. A large granite rectangular monument made from one of the boulders at the "Devil's Den" in Gettysburg to the east along the driveway commemorates the midnight change-of-command.

In July 1864, in the third Southern invasion, Confederate troops led by Lieutenant General Jubal Early occupied Frederick and extorted $200,000 ($4.12 million in 2025 dollars) from citizens in exchange for not razing the city on their way to Washington, D.C. Union troops under Major General Lew Wallace fought a successful delaying action, in what became the last significant Confederate advance at the Battle of Monocacy, also known as the "Battle that Saved Washington." The Monocacy National Battlefield lies just southeast of the city limits, along the Monocacy River at the B&O Railroad junction where two bridges cross the stream: an iron-truss bridge for the railroad and a covered wooden bridge for the Frederick-Urbana-Georgetown Pike, which was the site of the main battle of July 1864. Some skirmishing occurred further northeast of town at the stone-arched "Jug Bridge" where the National Road crossed the Monocacy; and an artillery bombardment occurred along the National Road west of town near Red Man's Hill and Prospect Hall mansion as the Union troops retreated eastward. Antietam National Battlefield and South Mountain State Battlefield Park which commemorates the 1862 battles are located 23 miles and 35 miles respectively to the west-northwest, while Gettysburg National Battlefield of 1863 lies approximately 35 miles (56 km) to the north-northeast.

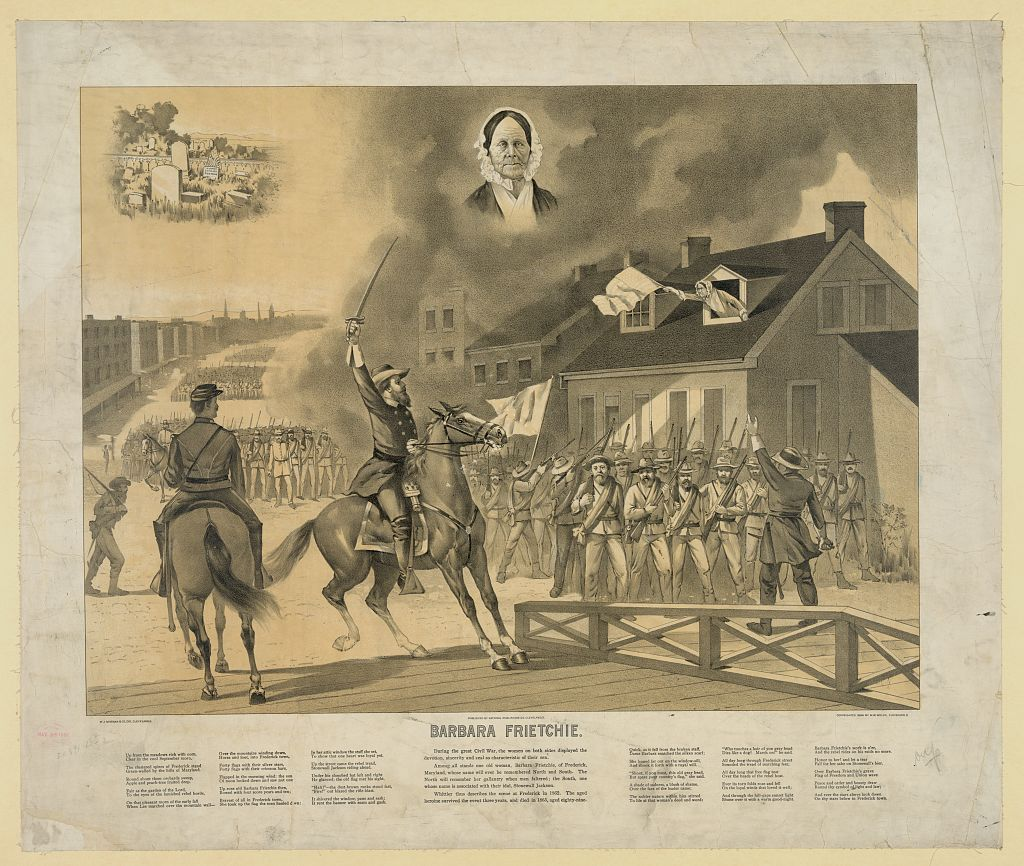
An 1896 print illustrating Barbara Fritchie

The reconstructed home of Barbara Fritchie stands on West Patrick Street, just past Carroll Creek linear park. Fritchie, a significant figure in Maryland history in her own right, is buried in Frederick's Mount Olivet Cemetery. British Prime Minister Winston Churchill quoted Whittier's poem to President Franklin D. Roosevelt when they stopped here in 1941 on a car trip to the presidential retreat, then called "Shangra-La" (now "Camp David") within the Catoctin Mountains near Thurmont.

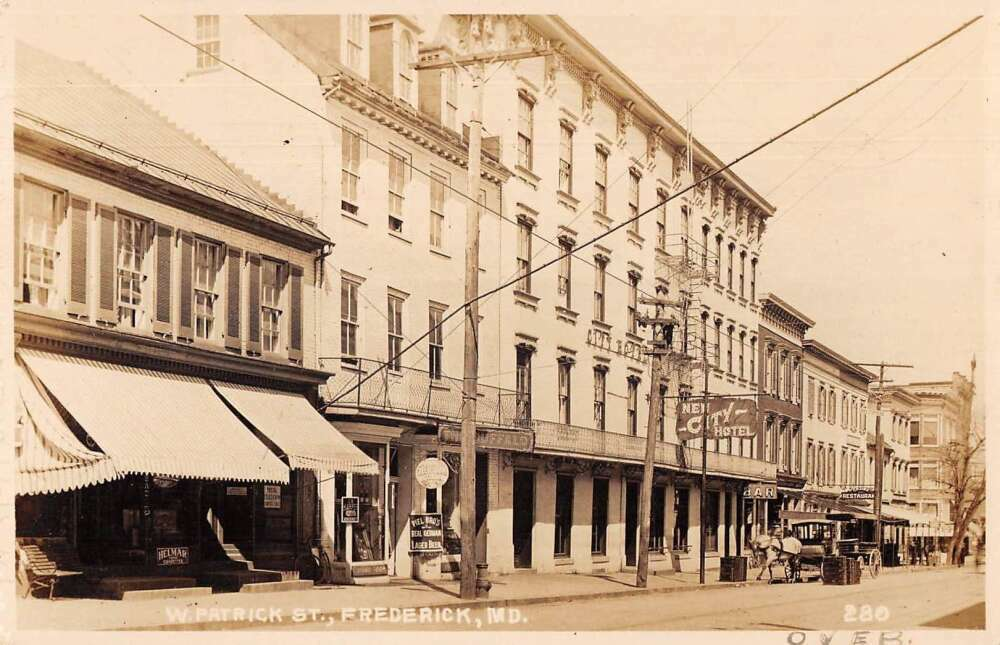
West Patrick Street in Frederick, May 1912

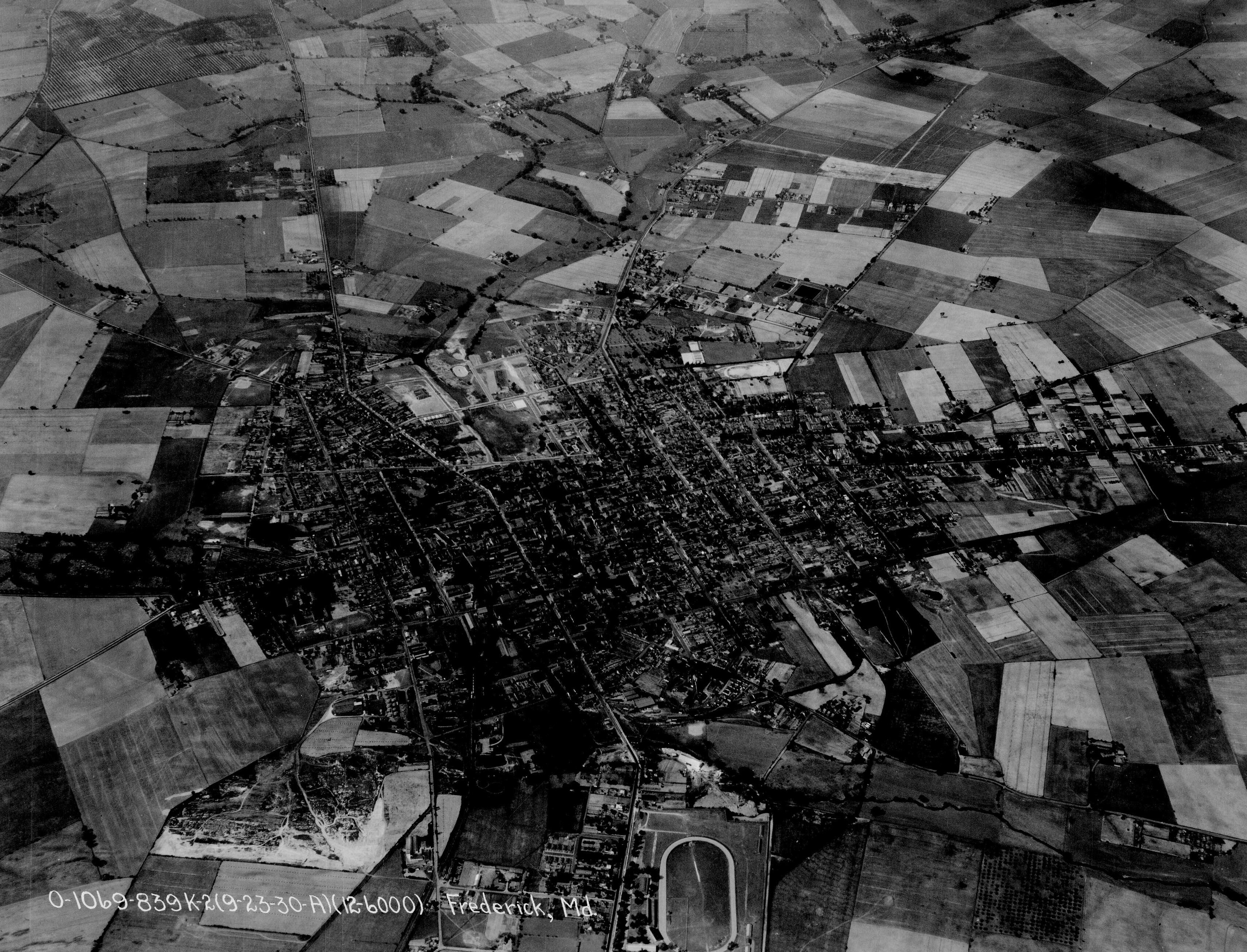
Aerial view, 1930

Admiral Winfield Scott Schley (1839–1911) was born at "Richfields", the mansion home of his father. He became an important naval commander of the American fleet on board his flagship and heavy cruiser USS Brooklyn along with Admiral William T. Sampson in the Battle of Santiago de Cuba off the shores of the Spanish island colony of Cuba in the Spanish–American War in 1898. Major Henry Schley's son, Dr. Fairfax Schley, was instrumental in setting up the Frederick County Agricultural Society and the Great Frederick Fair. Gilmer Schley served as mayor from 1919 to 1922, and the Schleys remained one of the town's leading families into the late 20th century.

Nathaniel Wilson Schley, a prominent banker, and his wife Mary Margaret Schley helped organize and raise funds for the annual Great Frederick Fair, one of the two largest agricultural fairs in the state. Since the 1960s, the fair has featured many outstanding country-western singers and become a major music festival. Schley Avenue commemorates the family's role in the city's heritage.

The Frederick and Pennsylvania Line railroad ran from Frederick to the Pennsylvania–Maryland state line, also known as the Mason–Dixon line. Chartered in 1867, construction began in 1869 and the line opened October 8, 1872. However, it defaulted on its interest payments in 1874 and was acquired by the Pennsylvania Railroad in 1875, which formed a new division to operate the rail line. In the spring of 1896, the Frederick and Pennsylvania Line railroad was liquidated in a judicial sale to the Pennsylvania Railroad for $150,000. The railroad survived through mergers and the Penn-Central bankruptcy. However, the State of Maryland acquired the Frederick and Pennsylvania Line in 1982. As of 2013, all but two miles (3.2 km) at the southern terminus at Frederick still exist, operated by either the Walkersville Southern, or the Maryland Midland Railway (MMID) railroads.

Jewish pioneers Henry Lazarus and Levy Cohan settled in Frederick in the 1740s as merchants. Mostly German Jewish immigrants organized a community in the mid-19th century, creating the Frederick Hebrew Congregation in 1858. Later the congregation lapsed, but was reorganized in 1917 as a cooperative effort between the older settlers and more recently arrived Eastern European Jews under the name Beth Sholom Congregation.

=== 20th century ===
In 1905, Rev. E. B. Hatcher started the First Baptist Church of Frederick.

After the Civil War, the Maryland legislature established racially segregated public facilities by the end of the 19th century, re-imposing white supremacy. Black institutions were typically underfunded in the state, and it was not until 1921 that Frederick established a public high school for African Americans. First located at 170 West All Saints Street, it moved to 250 Madison Street, where it eventually was adapted as South Frederick Elementary. The building presently houses the Lincoln Elementary School. The Laboring Sons Memorial Grounds, a cemetery for free blacks, was founded in 1851.

Frederick county began a shift away from Agriculture and towards manufacturing over the post-Civil War era, like most of the country. In 1914, more Marylanders worked in industry than in Agriculture, and more lived in urban areas than rural. In Frederick, many farms converted to dairy and orchards, with a decrease in milling. The shift away from rural life dawned a rise of subdivisions surrounding the urban center, with the creation of West Fifth, Sixth, and Seventh streets, as well as the Frederick City Hospital (now Frederick Health Hospital).

In the past few decades, the greatest theme and challenge of the city has been rapid expansion, per census data. The primary cause of this has been the expansion of the federal government and corresponding sprawl of the Metropolitan Washington area.

This rapid expansion has created a rise of traffic as a key political issue in the city.

== Geography ==
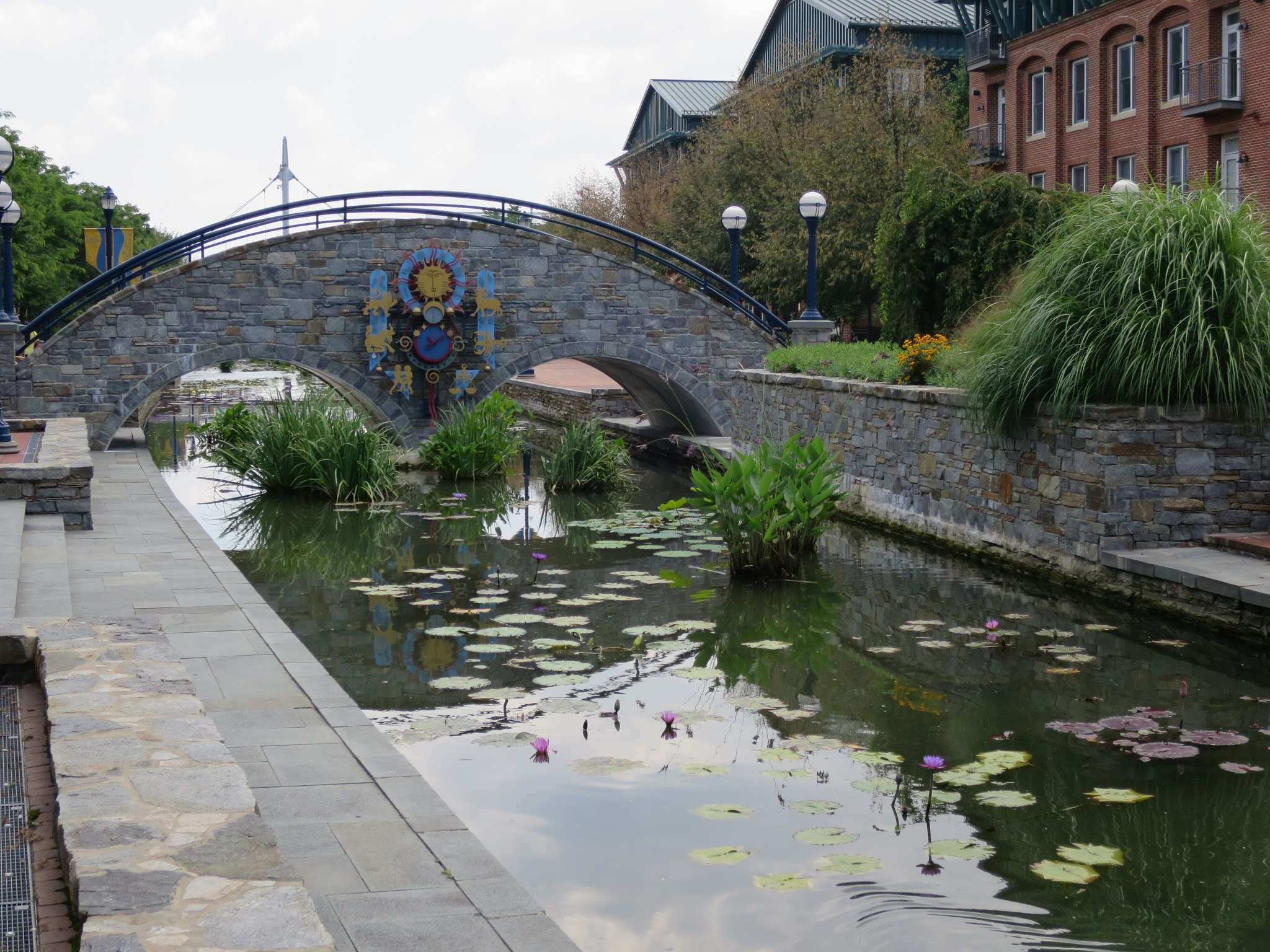
A bridge crossing over Carroll Creek in Carroll Creek Park

Frederick is located in Frederick County in the northern part of the state of Maryland. The city has served as a major crossroads since colonial times. Today it is located at the junction of Interstate 70, Interstate 270, U.S. Route 340, U.S. Route 40, U.S. Route 40 Alternate and U.S. Route 15 (which runs north–south). In relation to nearby cities, Frederick lies 46 miles (74 km) west of Baltimore, 50 miles (80 km) north and slightly west of Washington, D.C., 24 miles (39 km) southeast of Hagerstown and 71 miles (114 km) southwest of Harrisburg, Pennsylvania.

According to the U.S. Census Bureau, the city has a total area of 24.56 square miles (63.61 km^{2}), of which 24.38 square miles (63.14 km^{2}) is land and 0.18 square miles (0.47 km^{2}) is water. The city's area is predominantly land, with small areas of water being the Monocacy River, which runs to the east of the city, Carroll Creek (which runs through the city and causes periodic floods, such as that during the summer of 1972 and fall of 1976), as well as several neighborhood ponds and small city owned lakes, such as Culler Lake, a man-made small body of water in the downtown area.

=== Climate ===
The climate in this area is characterized by hot, humid summers and generally cool winters. It lies to the west of the fall line, which gives the city slightly lower temperatures compared to locales further east. According to the Köppen Climate Classification system, Frederick has a humid subtropical climate, abbreviated Cfa on climate maps. Frederick is also the site of the highest temperature recorded in Maryland at 109 °F (42.8 °C) on July 10, 1936.

Climate data for Frederick Police Barracks, Maryland (39°24′58″N 77°26′20″W), 1991–2020 normals, extremes 1894–2002
Month	Jan	Feb	Mar	Apr	May	Jun	Jul	Aug	Sep	Oct	Nov	Dec	Year
Record high °F (°C)	76 (24)	80 (27)	90 (32)	98 (37)	100 (38)	104 (40)	109 (43)	107 (42)	102 (39)	99 (37)	84 (29)	77 (25)	109 (43)
Mean daily maximum °F (°C)	43.1 (6.2)	47.8 (8.8)	55.3 (12.9)	68.6 (20.3)	77.4 (25.2)	85.2 (29.6)	88.6 (31.4)	86.7 (30.4)	80.0 (26.7)	68.8 (20.4)	56.3 (13.5)	47.1 (8.4)	67.1 (19.5)
Daily mean °F (°C)	34.8 (1.6)	38.2 (3.4)	45.5 (7.5)	56.7 (13.7)	66.2 (19.0)	74.2 (23.4)	78.5 (25.8)	76.5 (24.7)	69.7 (20.9)	58.0 (14.4)	47.1 (8.4)	38.9 (3.8)	57.0 (13.9)
Mean daily minimum °F (°C)	26.5 (−3.1)	28.5 (−1.9)	35.6 (2.0)	44.7 (7.1)	55.0 (12.8)	63.3 (17.4)	68.4 (20.2)	66.4 (19.1)	59.3 (15.2)	47.2 (8.4)	37.8 (3.2)	30.7 (−0.7)	46.9 (8.3)
Record low °F (°C)	−21 (−29)	−12 (−24)	0 (−18)	13 (−11)	24 (−4)	38 (3)	42 (6)	39 (4)	28 (−2)	22 (−6)	4 (−16)	−19 (−28)	−21 (−29)
Average precipitation inches (mm)	2.58 (66)	2.95 (75)	3.71 (94)	3.55 (90)	3.99 (101)	4.26 (108)	3.90 (99)	2.89 (73)	5.80 (147)	3.26 (83)	2.66 (68)	3.97 (101)	43.52 (1,105)
Average snowfall inches (cm)	7.2 (18)	4.8 (12)	2.5 (6.4)	0.0 (0.0)	0.0 (0.0)	0.0 (0.0)	0.0 (0.0)	0.0 (0.0)	0.0 (0.0)	0.0 (0.0)	0.3 (0.76)	1.7 (4.3)	16.5 (42)
Average precipitation days (≥ 0.01 in)	7.6	6.5	11.2	9.8	10.2	9.7	9.4	8.1	9.8	5.6	8.2	9.1	105.2
Average snowy days (≥ 0.1 in)	2.2	1.5	0.7	0.0	0.0	0.0	0.0	0.0	0.0	0.0	0.1	0.5	5.0
Source: NOAA (snow 1981–2010)

== Demographics ==
Historical population
Census	Pop.	Note	%±
1820	3,640		—
1830	4,427		21.6%
1840	5,182		17.1%
1850	6,028		16.3%
1860	8,143		35.1%
1870	8,526		4.7%
1880	8,659		1.6%
1890	8,193		−5.4%
1900	9,296		13.5%
1910	10,411		12.0%
1920	11,066		6.3%
1930	14,434		30.4%
1940	15,802		9.5%
1950	18,142		14.8%
1960	21,744		19.9%
1970	23,641		8.7%
1980	28,086		18.8%
1990	40,148		42.9%
2000	52,767		31.4%
2010	65,239		23.6%
2020	78,171		19.8%
2025 (est.)	92,059		17.8%
U.S. Decennial Census; 2025 estimate

=== Racial and ethnic composition ===
Frederick city, Maryland – racial and ethnic composition Note: the US Census treats Hispanic/Latino as an ethnic category. This table excludes Latinos from the racial categories and assigns them to a separate category. Hispanics/Latinos may be of any race.
Race / ethnicity (NH = Non-Hispanic)	Pop 2000	Pop 2010	Pop 2020	% 2000	% 2010	% 2020
White alone (NH)	39,568	37,933	38,221	74.99%	58.14%	48.89%
Black or African American alone (NH)	7,641	11,825	14,526	14.48%	18.13%	18.58%
Native American or Alaska Native alone (NH)	142	185	131	0.27%	0.28%	0.17%
Asian alone (NH)	1,651	3,775	4,425	3.13%	5.79%	5.66%
Native Hawaiian or Pacific Islander alone (NH)	29	45	67	0.05%	0.07%	0.09%
Other race alone (NH)	123	145	508	0.23%	0.22%	0.65%
Mixed-race or multiracial (NH)	1,080	1,929	3,925	2.05%	2.96%	5.02%
Hispanic or Latino (any race)	2,533	9,402	16,368	4.80%	14.41%	20.94%
Total	52,767	65,239	78,171	100.00%	100.00%	100.00%

=== 2020 census ===
As of the 2020 census, Frederick had a population of 78,171. The median age was 36.1 years. 22.6% of residents were under the age of 18 and 14.2% of residents were 65 years of age or older. For every 100 females there were 91.9 males, and for every 100 females age 18 and over there were 89.1 males age 18 and over.

99.8% of residents lived in urban areas, while 0.2% lived in rural areas.

There were 29,945 households in Frederick, of which 31.1% had children under the age of 18. Of all households, 42.0% were married-couple households, 19.2% were households with a male householder and no spouse or partner present, and 30.9% were households with a female householder and no spouse or partner present. About 30.0% of all households were made up of individuals and 10.6% had someone living alone who was 65 years of age or older.

There were 31,802 housing units, of which 5.8% were vacant. The homeowner vacancy rate was 1.6% and the rental vacancy rate was 6.1%.

Racial composition as of the 2020 census
Race	Number	Percent
White	40,714	52.1%
Black or African American	14,922	19.1%
American Indian and Alaska Native	527	0.7%
Asian	4,489	5.7%
Native Hawaiian and Other Pacific Islander	80	0.1%
Some other race	8,507	10.9%
Two or more races	8,932	11.4%
Hispanic or Latino (of any race)	16,368	20.9%

2020 census data put the racial makeup of the city at 48.9% White, 18.6% Black or African American, 0.2% Native American, 5.7% Asian American or Pacific Islander, and 20.9% Hispanic or Latino of any race. Roughly 5% of the city's population was of two or more races, with 0.6% categorized as "some other race".

In regard to minority group growth, the 2020 census data show the city's Hispanic population at 16,368, a 74 percent increase compared with 9,402 in 2010, making Hispanics/Latinos the fastest growing race group in the city and in Frederick County (87 percent increase). Frederick city had 4,425 Asian residents in 2020, a 17 percent increase from the city's 3,775 Asian residents in 2010. The city's Black or African-American population increased roughly 23 percent, from 11,825 in 2010 to 14,526 in 2020.

== Economy ==
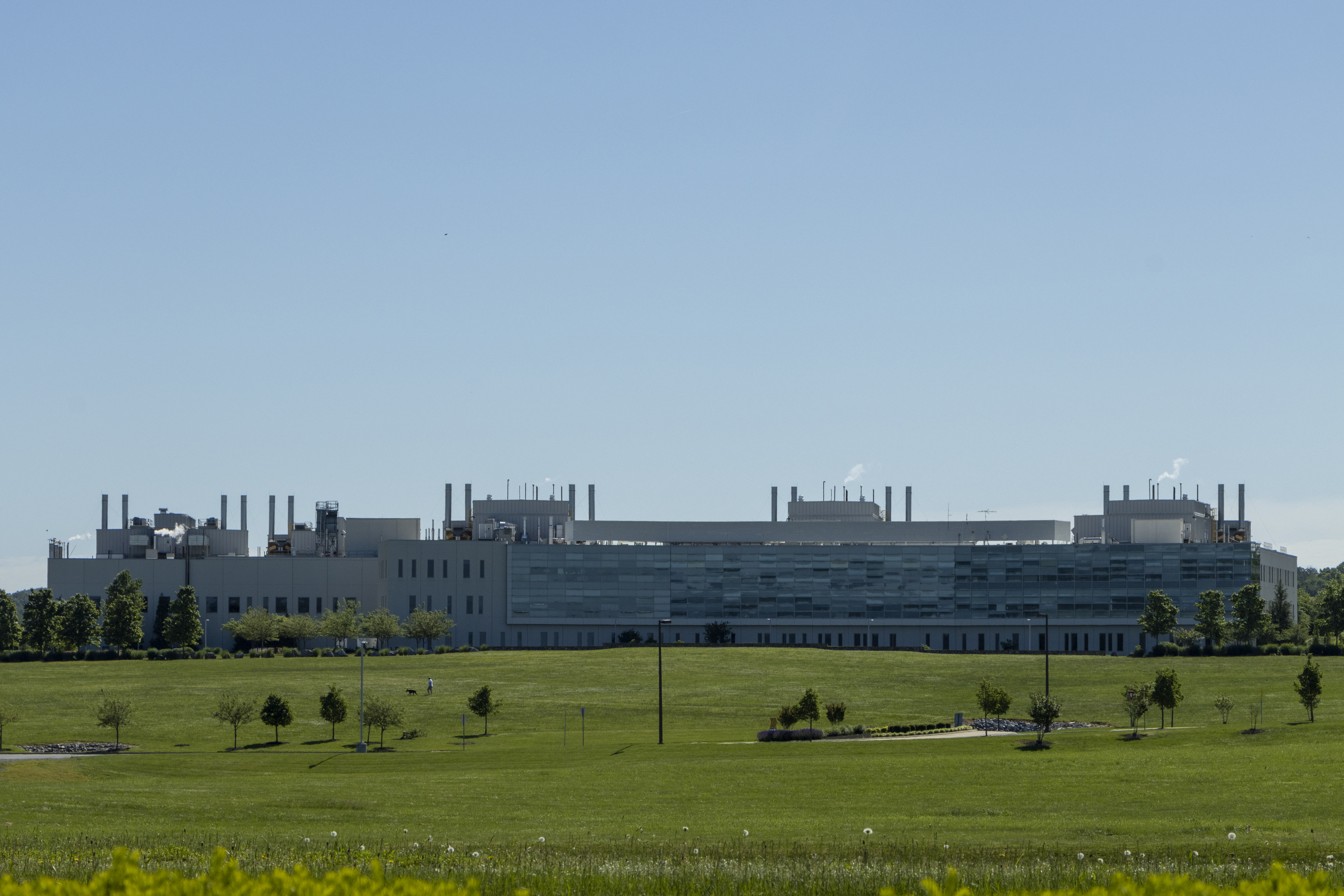
Frederick National Laboratory for Cancer Research

Frederick's relative proximity to Washington, D.C., has always been an important factor in the development of its local economy, along with the presence of Fort Detrick, its largest employer.

Frederick is the home of Riverside Research Park, a large research park located on Frederick's east side. Tenants include the relocated main offices of the National Cancer Institute's Frederick National Laboratory for Cancer Research as well as Charles River Labs; JLG Industries intends to establish a 113,000 square feet (10,500 m^{2}) facility here in 2025. As a result of continued and enhanced federal government investment, the Frederick area will likely maintain a continued growth pattern over the next decade. Frederick has also been impacted by recent national trends centered on the gentrification of the downtown areas of cities across the nation (particularly in the northeast and mid-Atlantic), and to re-brand them as sites for cultural consumption.

The Frederick Historic District in the city's downtown houses more than 200 retailers, restaurants and antique shops along Market, Patrick and East Streets. Restaurants feature a diverse array of cuisines, including Italian American, Thai, Vietnamese, and Cuban, as well as a number of regionally recognized dining establishments.

In addition to retail and dining, downtown Frederick is home to 600 businesses and organizations totaling nearly 5,000 employees. A growing technology sector can be found in downtown's historic renovated spaces, as well as in new office buildings located along Carroll Creek Park.

Carroll Creek Park began as a flood control project in the late 1970s. It was an effort to reduce the risk to downtown Frederick from the 100-year floodplain and restore economic vitality to the historic commercial district. Today, more than $150 million in private investing is underway or planned in new construction, infill development or historic renovation in the park area.

The first phase of the park improvements, totaling nearly $11 million in construction, run from Court Street to just past Carroll Street. New elements to the park include brick pedestrian paths, water features, planters with shade trees and plantings, pedestrian bridges and a 350-seat amphitheater for outdoor performances.

A recreational and cultural resource, the park also serves as an economic development catalyst, with private investment along the creek functioning as a key component to the park's success. More than 400,000 sf of office space; 150,000 sf of commercial/retail space; nearly 300 residential units; and more than 2,000 parking spaces are planned or under construction.

On the first Saturday of every month, Frederick hosts an evening event in the downtown area called "First Saturday". Each Saturday has a theme, and activities are planned according to those themes in the downtown area (particularly around the Carroll Creek Promenade). The event spans a ten-block area of Frederick and takes place from 5 p.m. to 9 p.m. During the late spring, summer, and early fall months, this event draws particularly large crowds from neighboring cities and towns in Maryland, and nearby locations in the tri-state area (Virginia and Pennsylvania). The average number of attendees visiting downtown Frederick during first Saturday events is around 11,000, with higher numbers from May to October.

=== Top employers ===
According to the county's comprehensive annual financial reports, the top employers by number of employees in the county are the following. ("NR" indicates the employer was not ranked among the top ten employers that year.)

Employer	Employees (2025)	Employees (2021)	Employees (2017)	Employees (2012)	Employees (2008)
Fort Detrick	10,827	8,776	5,600	9,200	7,900
Frederick County Board of Education	7,433	6,088	5,650	5,538	5,685
Frederick Health Healthcare System	3,360	3,300	2,328	2,300	2,569
Frederick County Government	2,810	2,342	2,030	2,130	3,170
Leidos Biomedical Research	2,370	2,334	2,050	1,965	NR
Frederick Community College	1,369	1,286	1,080	899	899
Frederick City Government	977	880	870	852	877
AstraZeneca	750	700	700	NR	NR
Aldi	698	NR	NR	NR	NR
Stulz Air Technology Systems	536	520	NR	NR	NR
Wells Fargo Home Mortgage	NR	1,175	1,700	1,881	1,500
UnitedHealthcare	NR	NR	128	832	1,100
State Farm Insurance	NR	NR	NR	793	758
BP Solar	NR	NR	NR	NR	550

== Culture ==
=== Cityscape ===
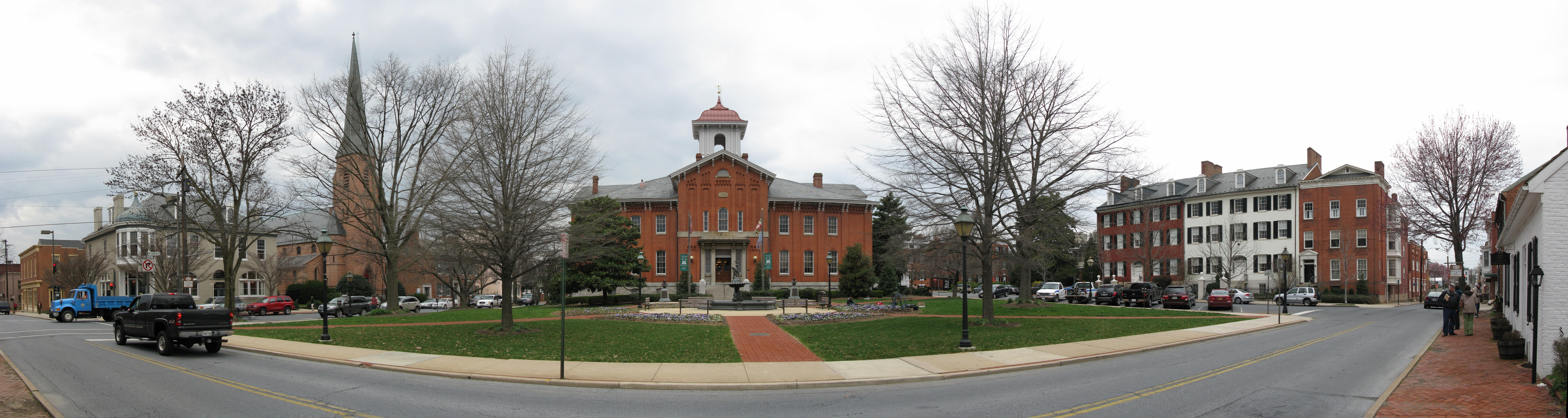
A panorama of downtown Frederick along North Court Street

Frederick is well known for the "clustered spires" skyline of its historic downtown churches. These spires are depicted on the city's seal and many other city-affiliated logos and insignia. The phrase "clustered spires" is used as the name of several city locations such as Clustered Spires Cemetery and the city-operated Clustered Spires Golf Course.

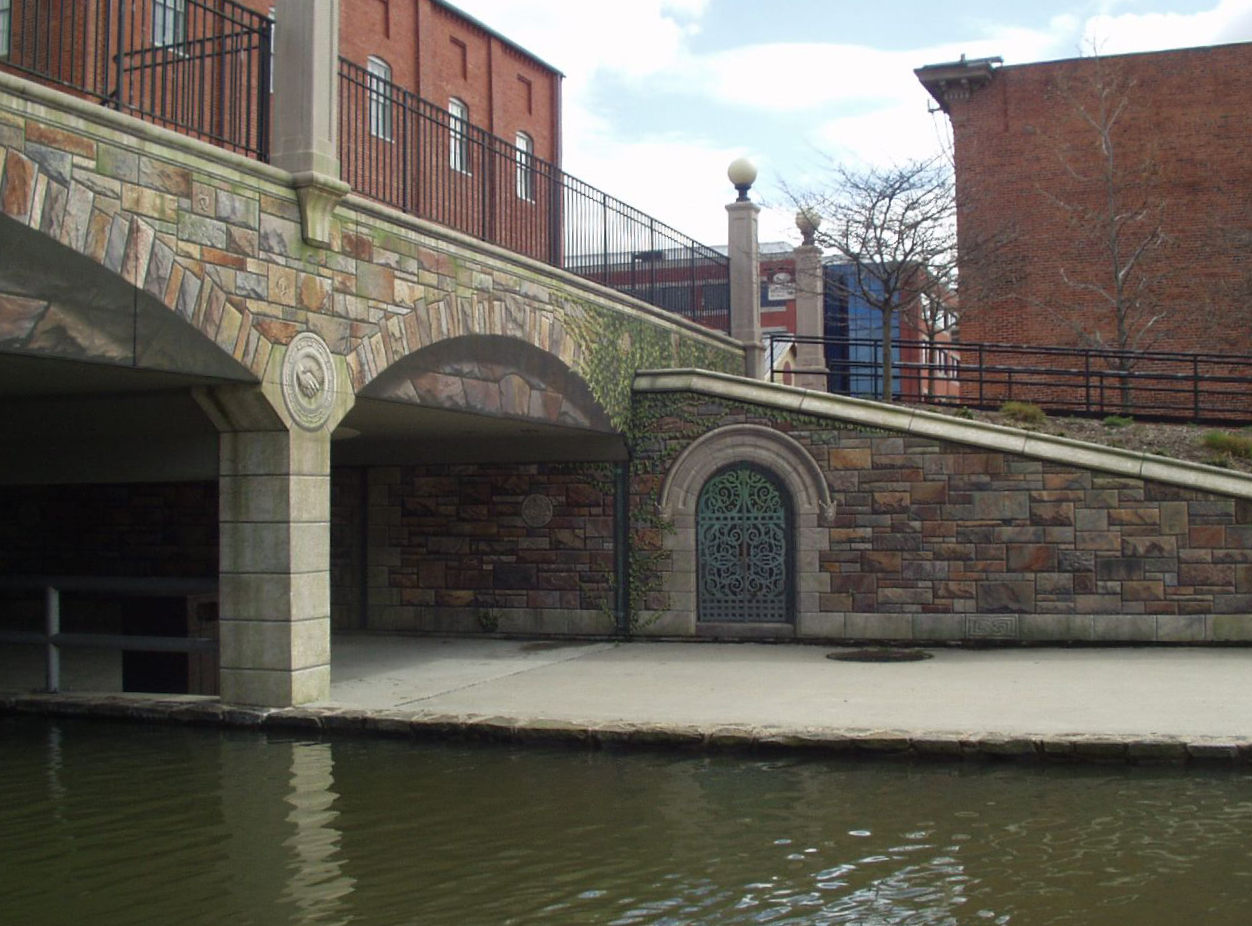
The Community Bridge mural in Frederick

Frederick has a bridge painted with a mural titled Community Bridge. The artist William Cochran has been acclaimed for the trompe-l'œil realism of the mural. Thousands of people sent ideas representing "community", which he painted on the stonework of the bridge. The residents of Frederick call it "the mural", "painted bridge", or more commonly, the "mural bridge".

=== Theatre and arts ===
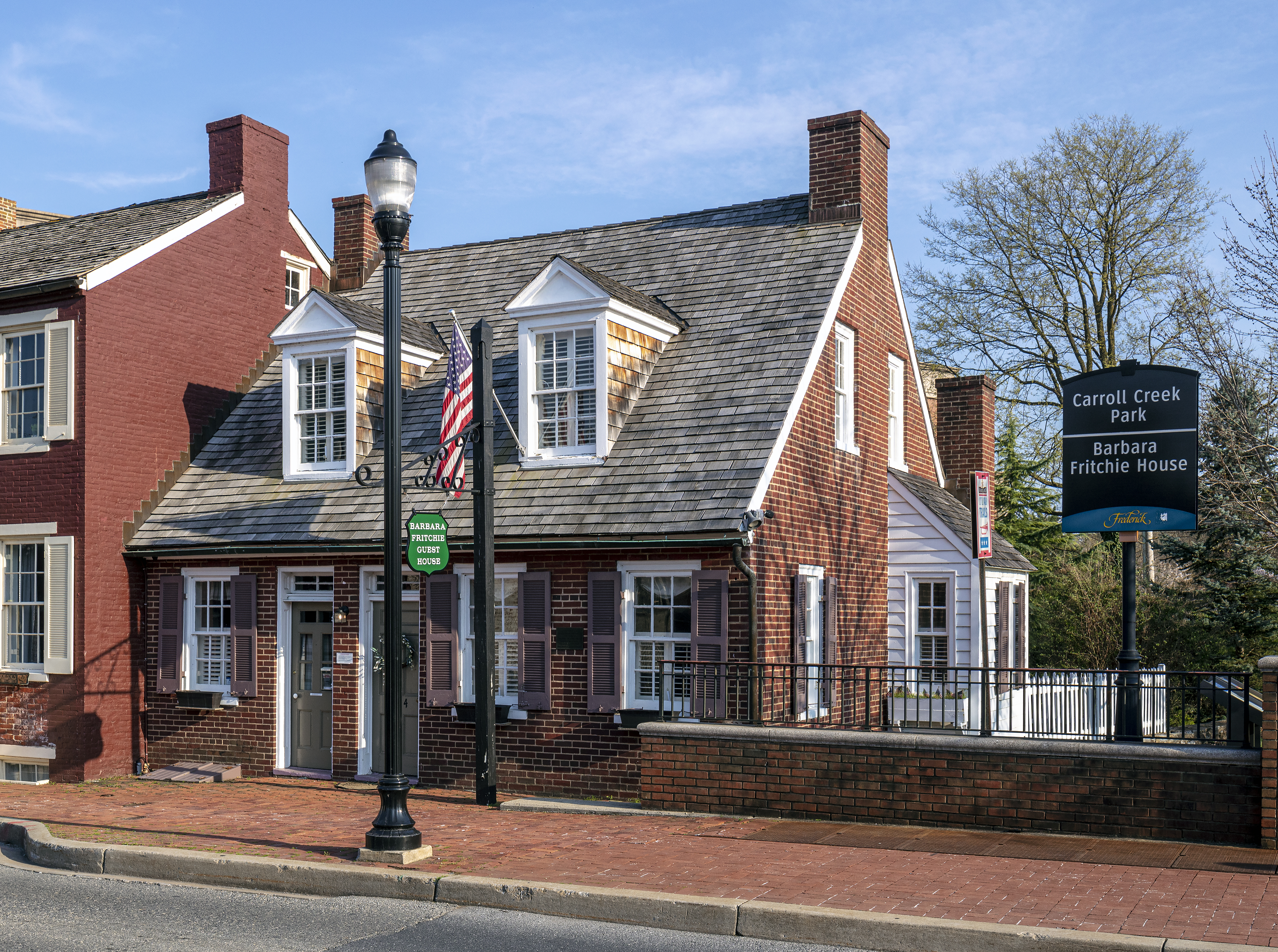
Barbara Fritchie house

The Frederick Arts Council is the designated arts organization for Frederick County. The organization is charged with promoting, supporting, and advocating the arts. There are over ten art galleries in downtown Frederick, and three theaters are located within 50 feet of each other (Cultural Arts Center, Weinberg Center for the Arts, and the Maryland Ensemble Theatre). Frederick is the home of The Delaplaine Visual Arts Education Center, a leading non-profit in the region, as well as the Maryland Shakespeare Festival.

In August 2007, the streets of Frederick were adorned with 30 life-size fiberglass keys as part of a major public art project entitled "The Keys to Frederick". In October 2007, artist William Cochran created a large-scale glass project titled The Dreaming. The project is in the historic theater district, across from the Wienberg Center for the Arts.

The Maryland Ensemble Theatre (MET), a professional theater company, is housed on the lower level of the Francis Scott Key Hotel. The MET first produced mainstage theater in 1997, but the group began performing together with its creation of The Comedy Pigs sketch comedy/improv troupe in April 1993. The students at Hood College also have a theatre club and put on shows at least once during the school year, sometimes two shows are presented during the school year.

The film Blair Witch Project (1999) was set in the woods west of Burkittsville, Maryland, in western Frederick County, but it was not filmed there.

=== Music ===
Frederick has a community orchestra, the Frederick Symphony Orchestra, that performs five concerts per year consisting of classical masterpieces. Other musical organizations in Frederick include the Frederick Chorale, the Choral Arts Society of Frederick, the Frederick Regional Youth Orchestra, and the Frederick Symphonic Band. The Frederick Children's Chorus has performed since 1985. It is a five-tier chorus, with approximately 150 members ranging in age from 5 to 18. A weekly recital is played on the Joseph Dill Baker Carillon every Sunday, year 'round, at 12:30 p.m. for half an hour. The carillon can be heard from anywhere in Baker Park, and the city carillonneur can be seen playing in the tower once a year as part of the Candlelight tour of Historic Houses of Worship, on the first weekday after Christmas.

Frederick is home to the Frederick School of Classical Ballet, the official school for Maryland Regional Ballet. Approximately 30 dance studios are located around the city. Each year, these studios perform at the annual DanceFest event. Frederick also has a large amphitheater in Baker Park, which features regular music performances of local and national acts, particularly in the summer months.

Clutch, a successful rock band formed in 1990, calls Frederick their home. The band rehearses for each album and tour in Frederick while drummer Jean-Paul Gaster has been a resident of Frederick since 2001. One of the band's biggest hits, "50,000 Unstoppable Watts", was written about Fort Detrick and Frederick.

Frederick is also home to indie-rock band Silent Old Mtns. The music video for their 2012 single "Dead All The Time" was shot entirely in Historic Downtown Frederick.

=== Library ===
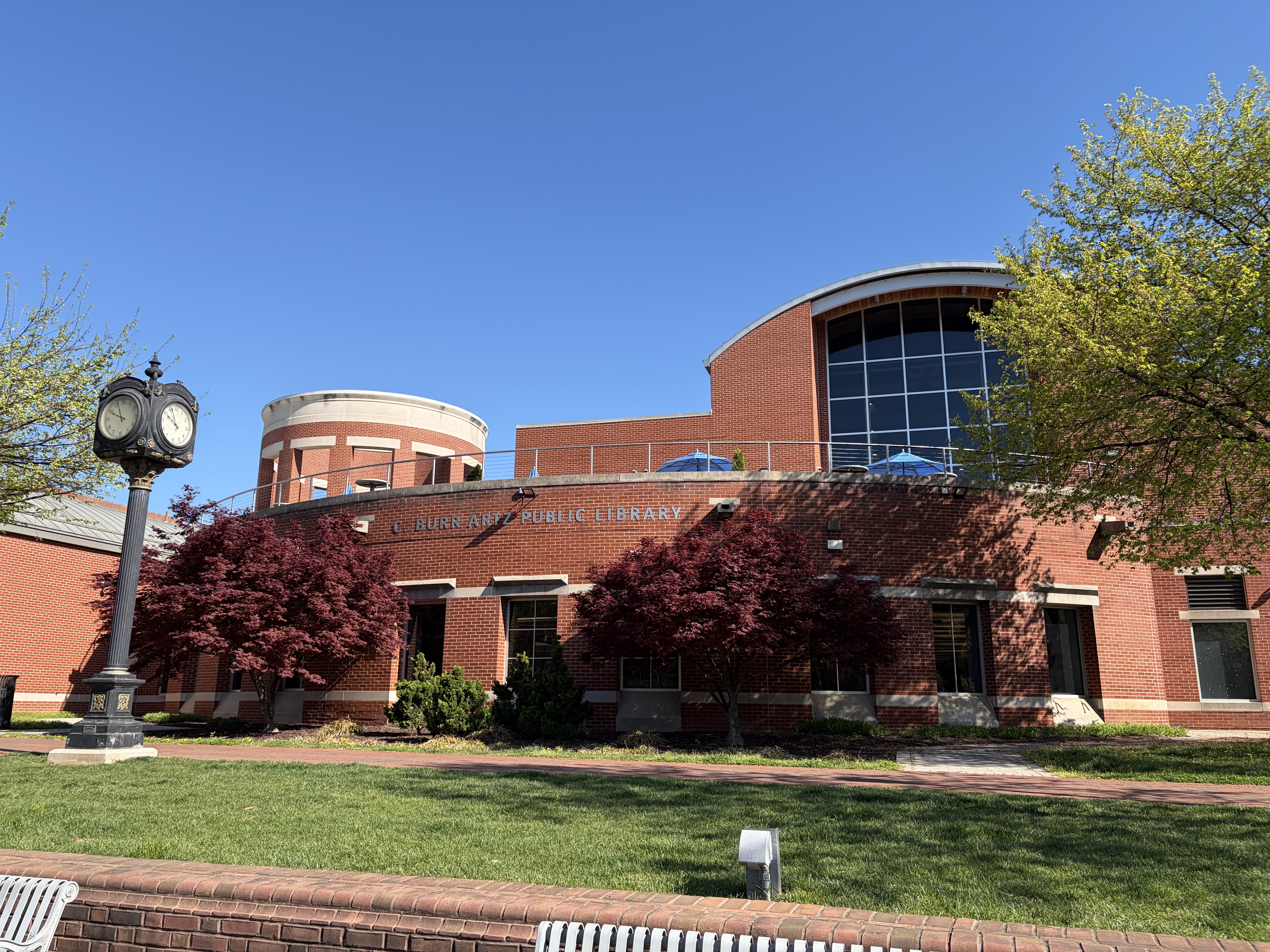
C. Burr Artz Public Library viewed from Carroll Creek

The main library for Frederick County is located in downtown Frederick, with several branches across the county.

The first recorded library in Frederick was the Frederick Town Library Company established in 1810. It was a subscription library that was open for both town, referring to what is now the city of Frederick, and county residents. The fate of the Library Company is unclear.

The next recorded attempt at establishing a Library was a proposal through an advertisement in the Fredericktown Herald on January 21, 1817, by Charles Mann. The proposal did not lead to a new public library in Frederick at the time. It was only in September 1865 that the Frederick Library Association was organized. Subsequently, later that year in December, a library was opened in Kemp Hall. The Frederick News reported in 1899 that the library was poorly patronized from the beginning. It eventually closed in 1871 due to lack of funds.

Another attempt was made to establish a library by the Jesuit fathers in Frederick. It occupied the ground floor of St. John's Literary Institute. In the Seventh Annual Report of the Maryland State Library Commission, it was noted that the St. John's Library opened to the public on February 13, 1899, and closed after two years on October 12, 1901.

Other libraries mentioned as being open to the public or by subscription in the early twentieth century Maryland State Library Commission reports include the Frederick College Library and the Tabard Inn Library, "located in one of the large stores". Because of segregation, black residents were not allowed to use the public libraries, and it wasn't until the late 1950s that the C. Burr Artz Library was open to all residents. The Young Mens Colored Reading Club, later known as the Free Colored Mens Library, was opened in 1913 at the home of Rev. Ignatius Snowden. It continued to operate until 1932.

On May 22, 1914, the Civic Club established the Frederick County Free Library. It acted as an interim library for 23 years while waiting for a portion of Margaret Catherine Thomas Artz's estate to be used to create a library, named after her late husband C. Burr Artz. The portion of the estate allocated for the new public library was to only become available upon the death of her daughter, Victorine Artz, if she had no heirs. In 1931, Victorine Artz died with no heirs and around $160,000 went towards the creation of a new public library. It wasn't until January 18, 1937, that the C. Burr Artz Library was opened on the corner of Record and Counsel Streets. On March 29, 1982, the Library moved to its current location on East Patrick Street with renovations and an addition made to the building in May 2002.

=== Retail ===
The city's main mall is the Francis Scott Key Mall. An abandoned retail center, the Frederick Towne Mall existed previously, and closed in 2013. In 2020, it was renamed District 40, and is currently being rebuilt into an entertainment center. The first business to open in District 40 was the movie theater Warehouse Cinemas in September 2020, followed by Spinners Pinball, a retro arcade which moved from North East Street to District 40 in July 2024.

=== Religion ===
There are numerous religious denominations in Frederick: the first churches were established by early Protestant settlers, followed by Irish Catholics and other European Catholics.

St. Paul African Methodist Episcopal Church in Della (now Urbana) is one of the oldest active African-American churches in Frederick County, Maryland, according to a testimonial placed in its cornerstone which stated that it was the first A.M.E. church built in the southern part of Frederick County. It was built in 1916 on a foundation first laid in 1908.

Other denominations represented in Frederick City and in the surrounding county include large numbers of Brethren, as well as some Pentecostal churches. Quinn Chapel, of the African Methodist Episcopal (A.M.E.) Church, is located on East Third Street. The AME Church, founded in Philadelphia in the early 19th century by free blacks, is the first black independent denomination in the United States. The Church of Jesus Christ of Latter-day Saints (LDS Church) has had a presence in Frederick since the 1970s when the first congregation was organized and now includes four congregations in two buildings within the city.

Beth Sholom Congregation, a conservative synagogue, has been in Frederick since 1917. Congregation Kol Ami, a Reform synagogue, was founded in 2003. Chabad Lubavitch of Frederick was founded in 2009.

Sri Bhaktha Anjaneya Temple, located in Urbana, serves Frederick's Hindu community.

The Islamic Society of Frederick, founded in the early 1990s, serves Frederick's Muslim community.

== Sports ==
=== Baseball ===
The Frederick Keys are a Minor League Baseball team in the South Atlantic League that are affiliated with the Baltimore Orioles. The Keys are named after Francis Scott Key, who was a resident of Frederick. They play at Nymeo Field at Harry Grove Stadium.

The Spire City Ghost Hounds are an independent baseball team in the Atlantic League of Professional Baseball that began playing at Nymeo Field at Harry Grove Stadium in April 2023. The team went on hiatus for the 2024 season, planning to return in 2025 when the Atlantic League was to expand to 12 teams.

=== Basketball ===
The Frederick Flying Cows are a professional basketball team competing in 94x50 League that started playing in Woodsboro Bank Arena at Hood College in April 2024. In the early 1990s, the Frederick Flyers played in the Atlantic Basketball League at Frederick Community College's arena before they relocated to Pennsylvania.

=== Soccer ===
FC Frederick is a semi-pro team in the National Premier Soccer League. The club plays home games at Thomas Athletic Field at Hood College.

=== Rugby ===
In 1990, Frederick Men's Rugby was formed. They are a D3 program in the Capital Rugby Union. They play their home matches at Tobin Triebel Pitch at Walnut Ridge Park.

In 2004, Frederick Women's Rugby was formed. They are a D3 program in the Capital Rugby Union. They play their home matches at Tobin Triebel Pitch at Walnut Ridge Park.

=== Cricket ===
A proposed cricket ground at the junction of Interstate 70 and East Patrick Street, abutting the Monocacy River was approved by the Frederick Planning Commission in July 2025, construction of which would require local land use rezoning. Significant public opposition emerged in advance of pending approval by the Frederick Council.

== Government ==
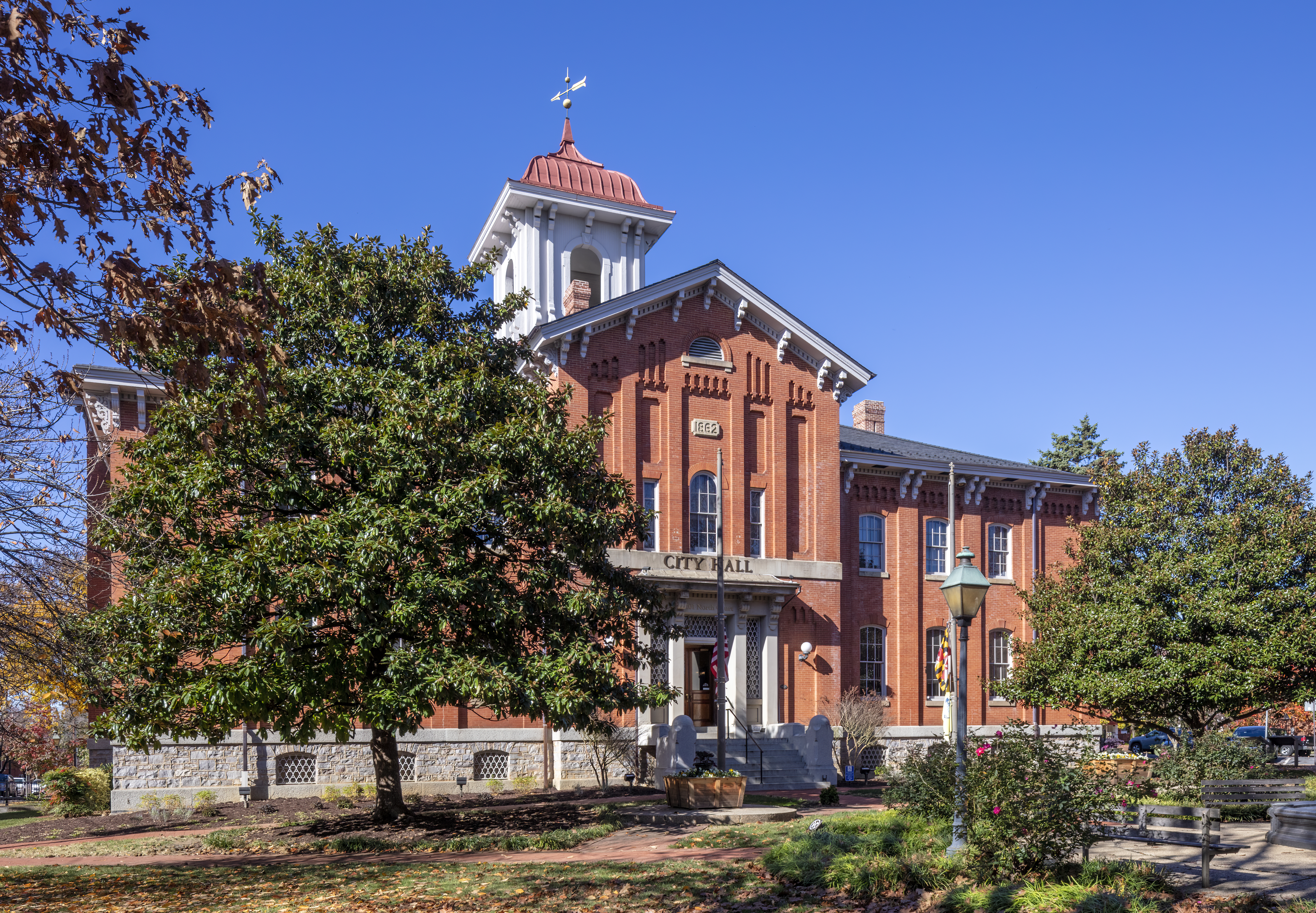
Frederick City Hall

=== Voting and voter registration ===
As of the November 4, 2025, local election, Frederick had 59,688 registered voters; the majority of local voting took place via mail-in and early voting rather than in-person on Election Day. A city-only voter registration roll came into effect in September 2024 coincident with allowing all residents, regardless of citizenship status, to vote in municipal elections. People who have state-level registration do not need to register at the city level. As of February 2025, not a single person had yet taken advantage of the city-level registration.

=== City executive ===
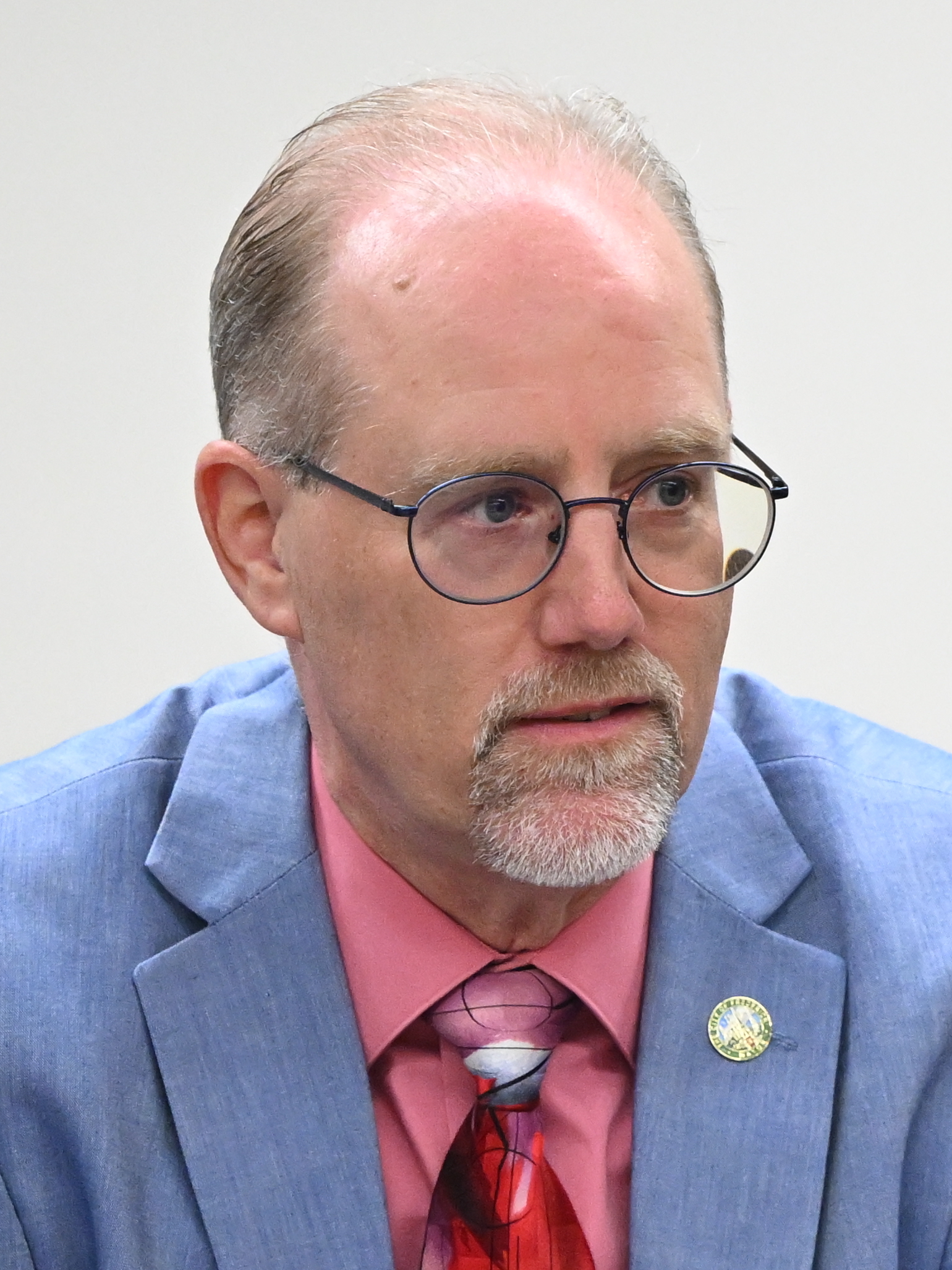
The incumbent mayor is Michael O'Connor (pictured in 2025).

In 2017, Democrat Michael O'Connor was elected mayor of Frederick.

Previous mayors include:

- Lawrence Brengle (1817)
- Hy Kuhn (1818–1820)
- George Baer Jr. (1820–1823)
- John L. Harding (1823–1826)
- George Kolb (1826–1829)
- Thomas Carlton (1829–1835)
- Daniel Kolb (1835–1838)
- Michael Baltzell (1838–1841)
- George Hoskins (1841–1847)
- M. E. Bartgis (1847–1849)
- James Bartgis (1849–1856)
- Lewis Brunner (1856–1859)
- W. G. Cole (1859–1865)
- J. Engelbrecht (1865–1868)
- Valerius Ebert (1868–1871)
- Thomas M. Holbruner (1871–1874)
- Lewis M. Moberly (1874–1883)
- Hiram Bartgis (1883–1889)
- Lewis H. Doll (1889–1890)
- Lewis Brunner (1890–1892)
- John E. Fleming (1892–1895)
- Aquilla R. Yeakle (1895–1898)
- William F. Chilton (1898–1901)
- George Edward Smith (1901–1910)
- John Edward Schell (1910–1913)
- Lewis H. Fraley (1913–1919)
- Gilmer Schley (1919–1922)
- Lloyd C. Culler (1922–1931)
- Elmer F. Munshower (1931–1934)
- Lloyd C. Culler (1934–1943)
- Hugh V. Gittinger (1943–1946)
- Lloyd C. Culler (1946–1950)
- Elmer F. Munshower (1950–1951)
- Donald B. Rice (1951–1954)
- John A. Derr (1954–1958)
- Jacob R. Ramsburg (1958–1962)
- E. Paul Magaha (1962–1966)
- John A. Derr (1966–1970)
- E. Paul Magaha (1970–1974)
- Ronald N. Young (1974–1990)
- Paul P. Gordon (1990–1994)
- James S. Grimes (1994–2002)
- Jennifer Dougherty (2002–2005)
- W. Jeff Holtzinger (2005–2009)
- Randy McClement (2009–2017)
- Michael O'Connor (2017–)

==== Recent mayoral elections ====
Recent mayoral election results
Year	Republican	Democratic	Third parties		Turnout
2021	Steven Hammrick; 14.31% 1,486	Michael O'Connor (inc.); 69.43% 7,208	Write-ins; 16.26% 1,688		21.79%
2017	Randy McClement (inc.); 36.66% 3,295	Michael O'Connor; 58.17% 5,229	Write-ins; 5.17% 465		20.77%
2013	Randy McClement (inc.); 49.56% 4,121	Karen Lewis Young; 31.10% 2,586	Jennifer P. Dougherty (party: "Other"); 19.10% 1,588	Write-ins; 0.24% 20	23.42%
2009	Randy McClement; 51.28% 3,712	Jason Judd Young; 47.40% 3,431	Write-ins; 1.31% 95		23.61%

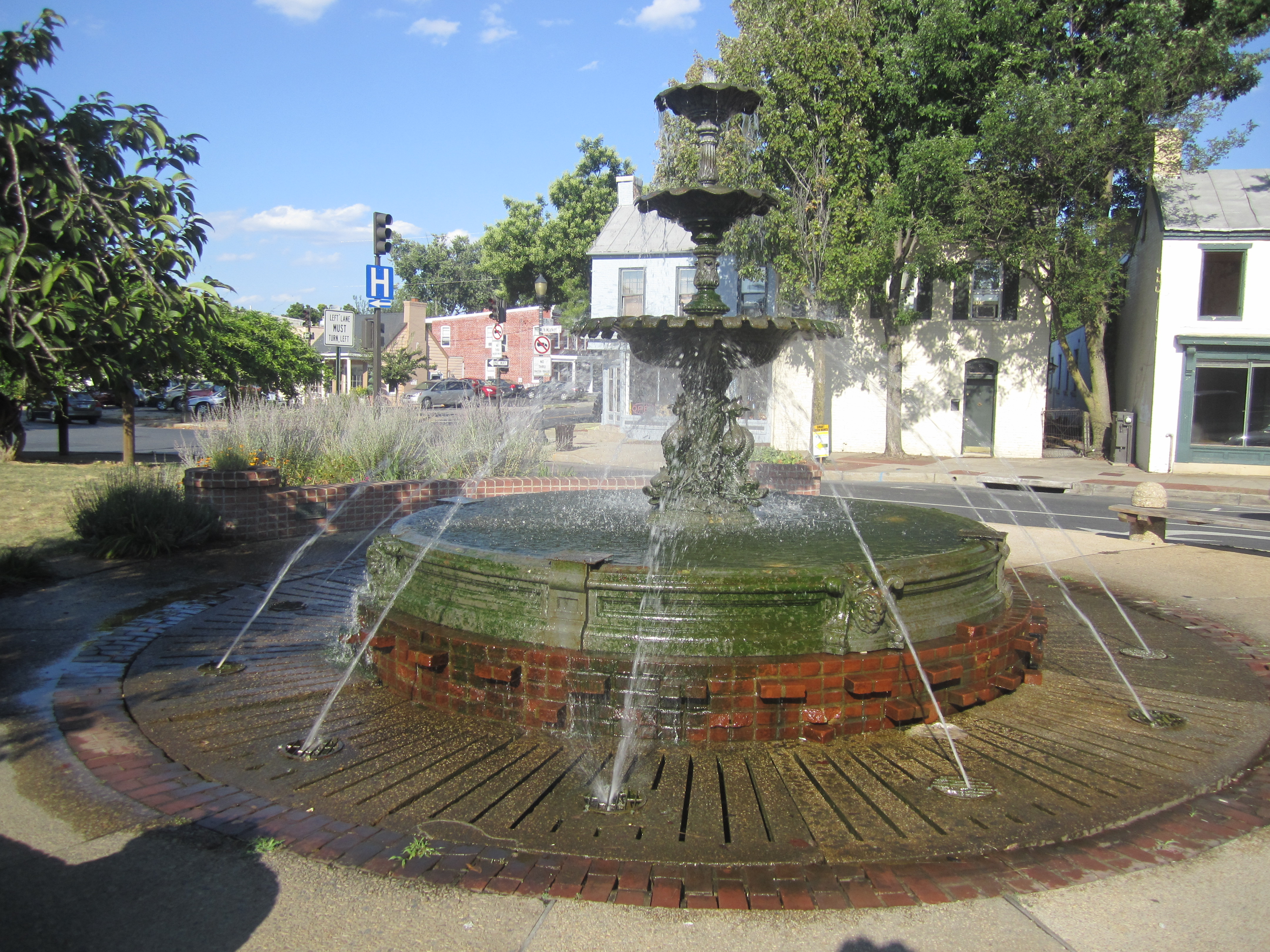
Fountain in Frederick

=== Representative body ===
Frederick had a board of aldermen of six members (one of whom was the mayor) as its legislative body until December 2025. Members were elected at-large, with mayoral candidates appearing separately on the ballot. Following discussions on how to modernize municipal government and increase voter participation, the Board of Aldermen passed legislation to transition the Board of Aldermen into a City Council, separating the Office of the Mayor into an independent executive branch. Elections are held every four years. As of 2026, the President of the City Council was César Díaz.

=== Police ===
The city has its own police department and is also covered by the county sheriff's office.

=== Budget ===
The proposed county budget for 2026 has been reported to be US$238 million, the approved 2025 budget being about US$223 million. City bonds were rated as AAA by Fitch Ratings as of July 2026.

== Education ==
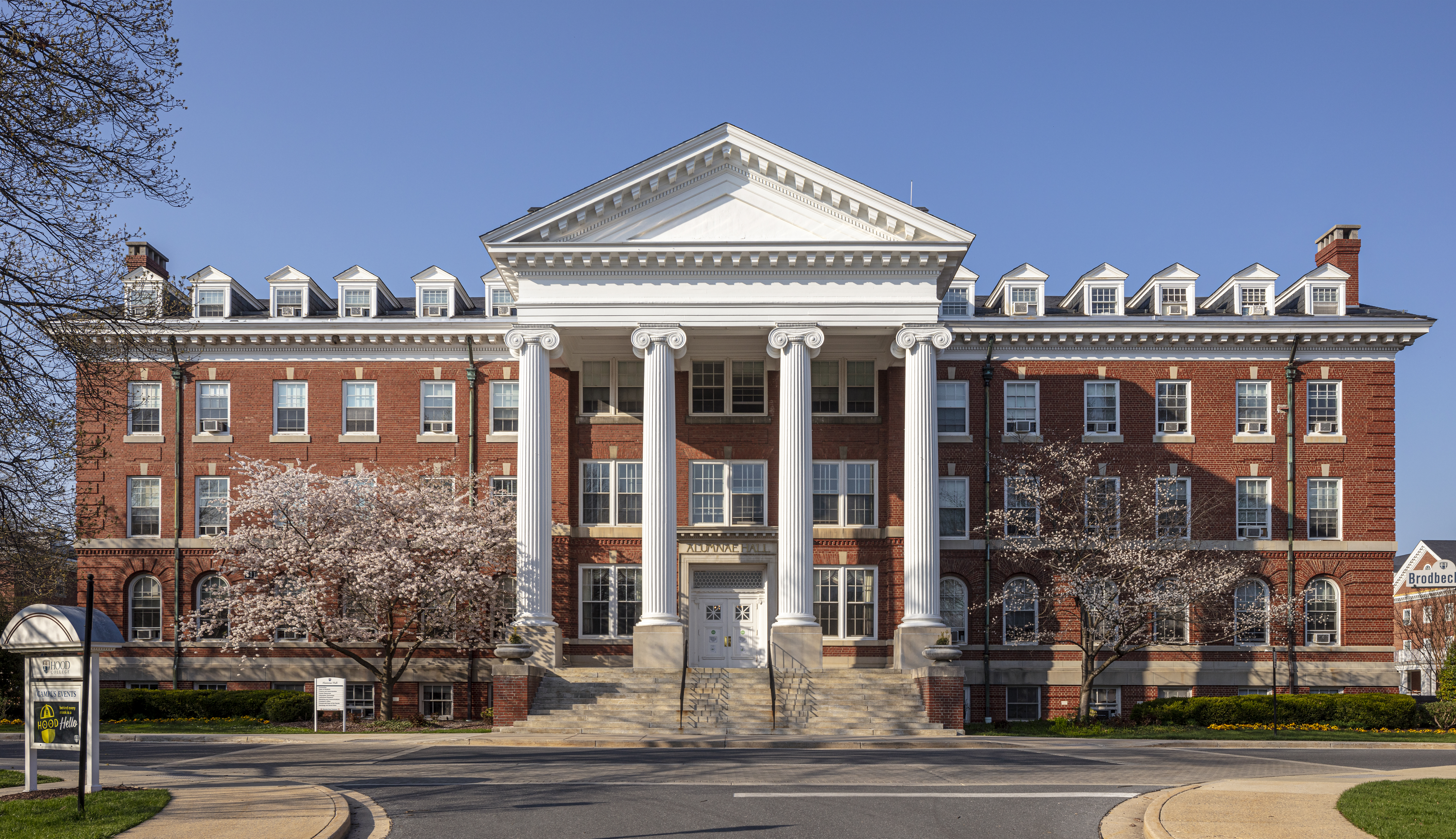
Alumnae Hall at Hood College

=== Public schools ===
Frederick County Public Schools (FCPS) operates area public schools.

Elementary schools in the city limits include:

- Butterfly Ridge
- Hillcrest
- Lincoln
- Monocacy
- North Frederick
- Parkway
- Waverly
- Whittier
- Yellow Springs

Other parts of the city limits are zoned to elementary schools outside of the city limits.

Middle schools in the city limits include:

- Governor Thomas Johnson Middle School
- Monocacy Middle School
- West Frederick Middle School

Other middle schools with sections of Frederick in their attendance boundaries include Ballenger Creek Middle School in Ballenger Creek, Crestwood Middle School in Ballenger Creek, and Walkersville Middle School in Walkersville.

Two public high schools, Frederick High School and Governor Thomas Johnson High School, are in the city limits. Other high schools with portions of their attendance boundaries including sections of the City of Frederick are Tuscarora High School (in Ballenger Creek; its attendance boundary covers a part of southern Frederick) and Walkersville High School (in Walkersville; its attendance boundary covers a part of northern Frederick).

Other public schools include Adult Education, Career and Technology Center, Heather Ridge School, Outdoor School, Rock Creek School, and the Earth and Space Science Laboratory. A public charter school, Frederick Classical Charter School, also serves students. Frederick County was long-time home to a highly innovative outdoor school for all sixth graders in Frederick County. This school was located at Camp Greentop, near the presidential retreat at Camp David and Cunningham Falls State Park.

Maryland School for the Deaf is a PreK-12 public statewide school for the deaf. It is not operated by the school district.

=== Private schools ===
- The Banner School
- Frederick Adventist Academy
- Frederick Christian Academy
- New Life Christian School
- St. John Regional Catholic School - of the Roman Catholic Archdiocese of Baltimore
- Saint John's Catholic Prep

=== Colleges and universities ===
- Frederick Community College
- Hood College

Mount St. Mary's University is near Emmitsburg.

== Media ==
=== Television ===
Frederick is licensed one Maryland Public Television station affiliate: WFPT 62 (PBS/MPT).

=== Radio ===
The city is home to WSHE 820 AM (the former WZYQ 1370) and 94.3 FM, relaying free-form The Gamut; WFMD 930 AM broadcasting a news/talk/sports format; WFRE 99.9 FM broadcasting country music; and WAFY 103.1 FM which plays all the latest pop songs. The following box details all of the radio stations in the local market.

=== Print ===
Frederick's newspaper of record is The Frederick News-Post.

== Transportation ==
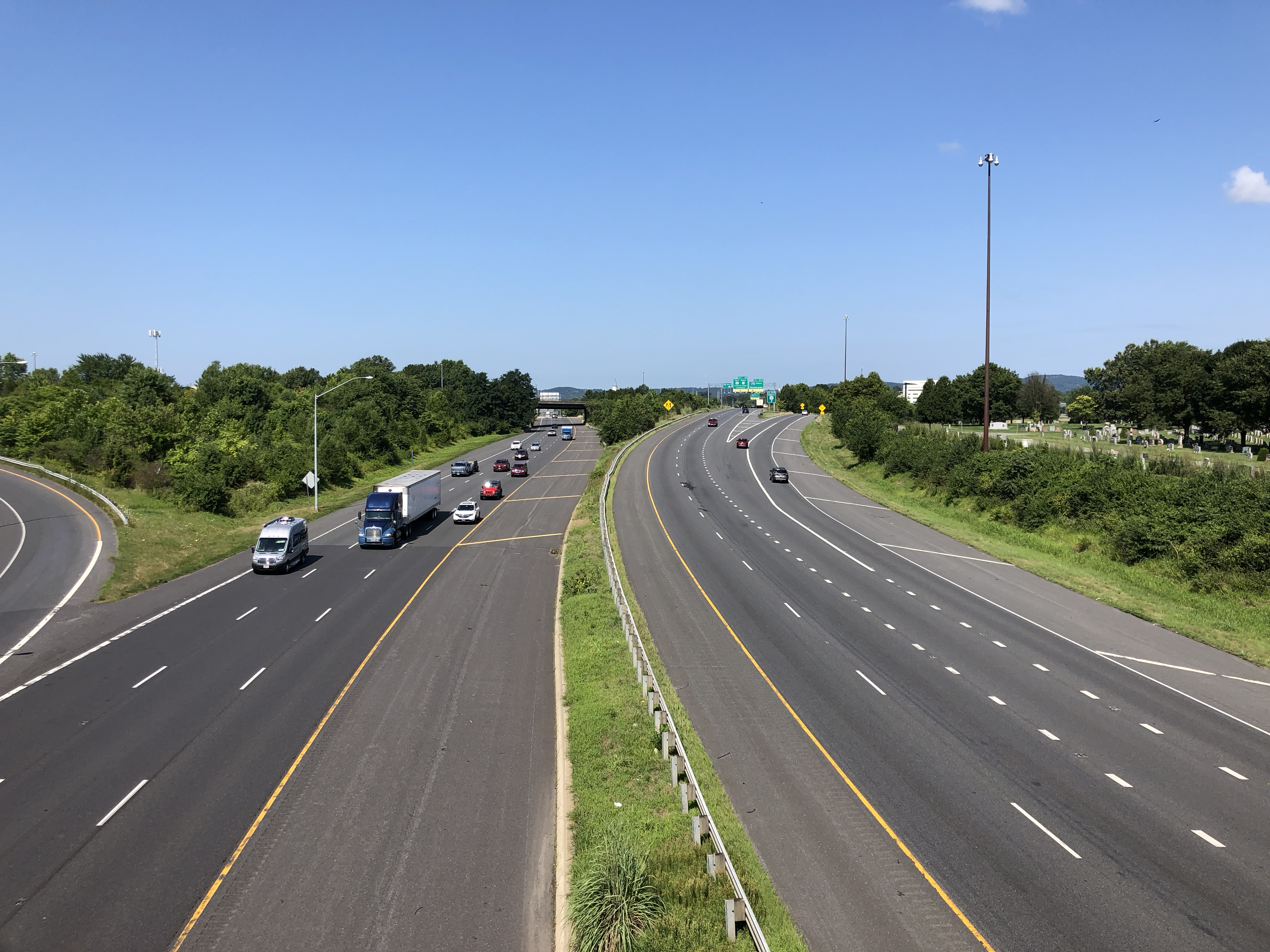
I-70 and US 40 in Frederick

Frederick's location as a crossroads has been a factor in its development as a minor distribution center both for the movement of people in Western Maryland, as well as goods. This intersection has created an efficient distribution network for commercial traffic in and out, as well as through the city.

Major highways serving in Frederick include:

- I-70: A major east–west interstate highway connecting Frederick to Baltimore and Hagerstown
- I-270 Dwight D. Eisenhower Memorial Highway: Begins at I-70, and spurs southeastward towards Washington, D.C.
- US 15 Frederick Freeway: Travels north to Gettysburg, PA and south concurrent with U.S. 340 to Point of Rocks, Maryland and Leesburg, Virginia.
- US 40: Runs concurrent with I-70 and U.S. 15 North until becoming West Patrick Street and Old National Pike to Middletown.
- US 340: Runs southwestward with U.S. 15 until spurring west towards Harpers Ferry, West Virginia.

From 1896 to 1961, Frederick was served by the Hagerstown & Frederick Railway, an interurban trolley service that was among the last surviving systems of its kind in the United States.

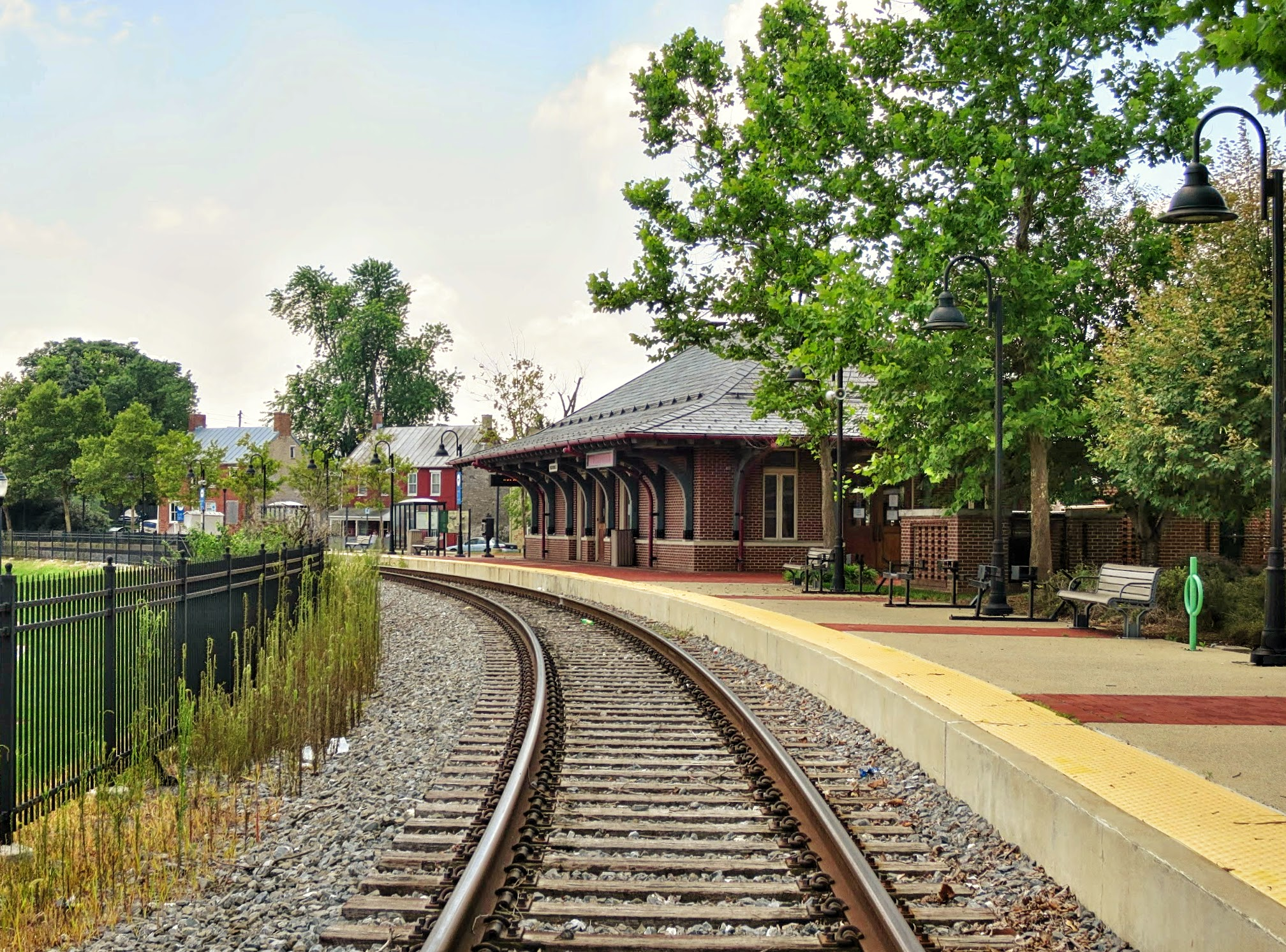
Frederick station

The city is served by MARC commuter rail service, which operates several trains daily on the former Baltimore and Ohio Railroad's Old Main Line and Metropolitan Branch subdivisions to Washington, D.C.; Express bus route 991, which operates to the Shady Grove Metrorail Station, and a series of buses operated by TransIT services of Frederick, Maryland. Greyhound Lines also serves the city along with one bus route from Loudoun County Transit.

Frederick Municipal Airport has a mile-long runway and a second 3600' runway.

Beginning in the 1990s, Frederick has invested in several urban infrastructure projects, including streetscape, new bus routes, as well as multi-use paths. A circular road, Monocacy Boulevard, is an important component to the revitalization of its historic core.

The Mayor's Ad-hoc Bicycle Committee was formed in 2010 and given the mission to achieve designation for the city as a Bicycle Friendly Community (BFC) by the League of American Bicyclists. The first application resulted in an Honorable Mention. Upon reapplication In 2012, Frederick achieved the bronze level BFC designation. The city's third application resulted in re-certification as a Bronze Bicycle Friendly Community. Work is ongoing to achieve an even stronger designation (Silver) at the time of the next application.

In 2013, the Mayor's Ad-hoc Bicycle Committee was expanded in scope to include pedestrian issues and was formally adopted by Resolution 13-08 as a permanent standing committee called the Bicycle and Pedestrian Advisory Committee (BPAC). The BPAC advises City officials and staff on the sound development, management, and safe use of The City of Frederick's pedestrian and bicycle systems as they relate to infrastructure, accessibility, and promoting the benefits of these systems.

In 2024, the BPAC was renamed as the Active Mobility Advisory Committee (AMAC), wish a larger scope targeting other forms of transportation including "walking, biking, skateboarding,... wheelchair, e-scooter, or any other form of micromobility."

== See also ==
- USS Frederick, 2 ships
