= FPD =

FPD may refer to:

== US police departments ==
- Ferguson Police Department (Missouri)
- Frederick City Police Department (Maryland)
- Fresno Police Department, California
- Fowler Police Department, Colorado

== Other uses ==
- Democratic People's Federation (Spanish Federación Popular Democrática)
- First Presbyterian Day School, in Macon, Georgia, United States
- Flame-photometric detector
- Flat-panel detector
- Flat-panel display
- Freezing-point depression
- Liga FPD (Costa Rican top-level football league)
