= John Harding =

John Harding is the name of:

- John Harding (Leicester MP), British politician who represented Leicester (UK Parliament constituency) in 1338?
- John Harding (President of Magdalen) (died 1610), English churchman and academic
- Sir John Harding (1809–1868), Queens Advocate
- John Harding (Southern planter) (1777–1865), American Southern planter and Thoroughbred breeder
- John Harding (cricketer) (fl. 1809), English cricketer
- John Harding (bishop) (1805–1874), bishop of Bombay
- J. Eugene Harding (1877–1959), U.S. Representative from Ohio
- John Harding, 1st Baron Harding of Petherton (1896–1989), British Second World War general, Chief of the Imperial General Staff and Governor of Cyprus
- John Harding, 2nd Baron Harding of Petherton (1928–2016), British Army officer
- John L. Harding (1780–1837), American mayor of Frederick, Maryland
- Jack Harding (1898–1963), American coach of American football
- J. P. Harding (1911–1998), British zoologist
- John Harding (footballer) (1932–1994), Australian rules footballer
- John Harding (photographer) (born 1940), American photographer
- John Tisdale Harding (born c. 1945), American on-air radio personality and news director
- John Harding (violinist) (born 1950), Australian violinist
- John Harding (author) (1951–2017), British novelist
- John Wesley Harding (singer) (born 1965), English singer
- John Harding (playwright) (fl. 1990s– ), Australian playwright, co-founder and board member of the First Nations Australia Writers Network
- John Harding (Sha ko hen the tha) (fl. 2000s), Mohawk leader and politician from Quebec, Canada

== See also ==
- John Hardin (disambiguation)
- John Hardyng (1378–1465), English chronicler
- John Wesley Hardin (1853–1895), American gun-fighter
- John Wesley Harding, a 1967 album by Bob Dylan named after John Wesley Hardin
  - "John Wesley Harding" (song)
