= Naked Raccoon =

Studio album by Silent Old Mtns
- Released: June 19, 2013
- Recorded: June 2011 at The Key Facility, Monrovia, MD
- Genre: Indie folk, indie rock
- Length: 48:24
- Producer: Myles Vlachos

Silent Old Mtns chronology
Velvet Raccoon (2012)	Naked Raccoon (2013)	Untitled Release

Naked Raccoon is an acoustic album by American indie rock band Silent Old Mtns, released on June 19, 2013. It is a companion album to Silent Old Mtns' previous record, Velvet Raccoon, marking the one year anniversary of its release. The album contains all of the tracks from Velvet Raccoon performed acoustically, supplemented by poetry inspired by the album. It was recorded in June 2011 at the Key Facility in Monrovia Maryland, and produced by Myles Vlachos.

On the day of its release Naked Raccoon was review by Trebuchet Magazine's Scott Ladauti. He writes... "Naked Raccoon works so well. A stripped down, track by track, acoustic replica of their first album. Released on June 19th, Naked Raccoon brings the curtain down on a full year of recording and touring under the ten tracks that we first heard on the plugged-in big brother, Velvet Raccoon. Most of the record’s focus is Brohmal’s voice and his guitar."

== Track listing ==
1. "Crust Punks" - 1:34
2. "Ash and Bone" - 3:18
3. "Spaceman Ricky" - 1:45
4. "That Telescope Find" - 5:19
5. "The Biggest Oak Tree" - 1:52
6. "Under Oak" - 3:27
7. "You've Got Your Sights On Me Now" - 3:53
8. "Dead All The Time" - 5:08
9. "Monsters" - 5:14
10. "Songbird" - 1:10
11. "The Most Logical Thing" - 3:27
12. "Old Man" - 3:43
13. "Mine To Give" - 3:52
14. "Pigeons" - 5:34

== Personnel ==
- Andrew Bromhal - Lead Vocals, Guitar
- Samuel Whalen - Spoken Word
