= John Hardin (disambiguation) =

John Hardin may refer to:

- John Hardin (1753–1792), Continental Army officer in the American Revolutionary War
- John J. Hardin (1810–1847), U.S. Representative from Illinois
- John Wesley Hardin (1853–1895), outlaw and gunfighter of the American Old West

== See also ==
- John Hardin High School named after the Continental Army officer
- John Harding (disambiguation)
