= Silent Old Mtns =

American indie rock band

Silent Old Mountains
- Origin: Frederick, Maryland
- Genres: Indie rock
- Years active: 2010–present
- Members: Andrew Bromhal; Samuel Whalen; Pat Acuña; Joe Jalette; Colin Shultzaberger; John Fenker
- Website: silentoldmountains.com

Silent Old Mtns (Silent Old Mountains) is an American indie rock band, formed in Frederick, Maryland, in 2011 by singer songwriter Andrew Bromhal. They have released two full-length albums and are most noted for their energetic and theatrical live shows. They are also well known for their promotion of the indie music scene and DIY ethic: at one point touring the country in a repurposed school bus and averaging over 100 live performances per year despite having no corporate backing. DC Rock Live music blog's David Hintz describes their sound as "a whacked out brand of Americana folk rock that dives headlong into psyche terrain frequently."

== Formation (2010–11) ==
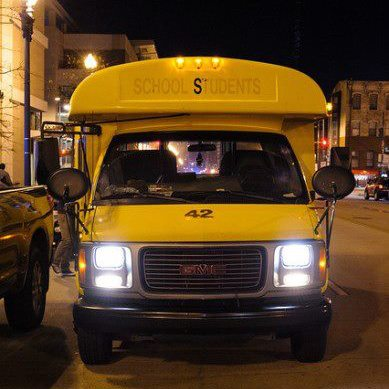
Silent Old Mtns' School/Tour bus

Silent Old Mtns' began in 2010 as a solo project by lead singer Andrew Bromhal. Bromhal would play various coffee shops and bars in the Baltimore-Washington area before expanding to a trio with the addition of Pat Acuña and Thom Huenger in the spring of 2011. Though the expansion was originally only intended to last one night, it was so well received that the move was made permanent and Silent Old Mtns became a band. Shortly after their first performances, local poet Samuel Whalen began to perform spoken word before and during the Mtns' sets. Eventually he was adopted as a banjo player, and became one of the most memorable aspects of their live performance, described by Trebuchet Magazine as... "Sam is the Silent Old Mtns' resident poet. Live, Sam is an IED. At first the crowd is usually confused when a madman next to the drum set starts screaming poems at them. But by his last line, the place has frozen. They've just watched a Gypsy king with shooting stars in his crown. And they're not sure what they feel, but it's enough to take their iPhones out and get the videos streaming." By mid-2011 Steve Younkins, nephew of Kix guitarist Ronnie Younkins, was added on bass guitar, creating the original lineup.

== Velvet Raccoon (2012) ==
Silent Old Mtns began recording their debut album,Velvet Raccoon, in August 2011 at the Key Facility in Monrovia, MD with producer Myles Vlachos. The album was named after a velvet painting of a raccoon that drummer Pat Acuña purchased at a flea market while living in Nashville, TN. Its lead single, Dead All The Time, was released along with a music video on March 22, 2012. This was followed by the release of the album on June 19, 2012. Critical response to Velvet Raccoon was generally positive, receiving an 8/10 when reviewed by Live Music Guide, calling it "...the first step of a visionary band with an honest and original sound." While Muzik Dizcovery's Casey Whitman wrote "Velvet Raccoon is hard to classify and unconventional, but the band has made an enormous leap, blowing away even my high expectations."

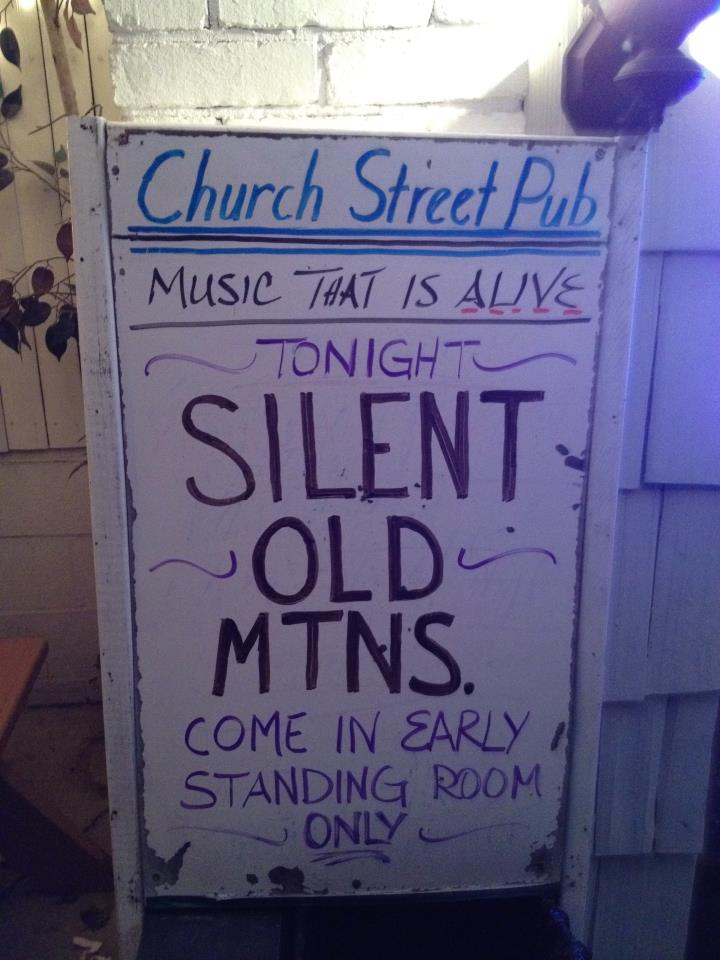
Early Silent Old Mtns Marquee sing

In summer 2012 Silent Old Mtns began touring heavily to support Velvet Racoon, and were featured in a live performance and interview on The Blue Plate Special Radio Show in Knoxville TN. Between touring schedules, they were also invited to serve as the house band for the Maryland Ensemble Theatre's original production, The All New Grand Ole Hee Haw Hootenanny Howdown Jamboree. Members of the band were featured in sketches and other musical routines. The show ran for 16 performances and was well received, earning 4 out of 5 stars from [dcmetrotheaterarts.com].

During this time Joe Jalette was added as the band's first lead guitarist. In a 2013 interview Pat Acuña was quoted as saying, "I can't believe we played this long without Joe. It's such a gaping hole in the music when we perform without him, and it blows my mind that we got to the point we have without that dynamic."

In a January 2013 interview with Sweet Tea Pumpkin Pie, the band confirmed they would be entering the studio to work on their second record with producer Matt Cramer. This album was ultimately never released, as the band broke up during recording. The only song from this track list ever released was the lead single "Beautiful Animal", it was recorded live and is available via Daytrotter. During a sneak preview of the track Gorilla Magazine's Andrew Bailey described the new song: "Although it isn't the final mix, the new song represents a leap forward in the method of capturing the band's live signature. The sound is fuller and the playback more closely resemble what you'd get from a stage show versus the polish of a studio." Though he is featured on Beautiful Animals, Steve Younkins announced his departure from the band during this time.

In March 2013 Silent Old Mtns partnered with Daytrotter Studios in Rock Island, IL to stream a live performance via the Daytrotter website. The session was recorded to tape and was released in June 2013. Shortly after this performance, touring member Colin Shultzaberger was named as the Mtns' new full-time bassist.

Promotional shot from 2013

For the one year anniversary of Velvet Raccoon's release, Silent Old Mtns announced via Facebook that they would be releasing a new album titled Naked Raccoon. The album contains all 10 of the tracks featured on Velvet Raccoon performed acoustically, as well as poetry inspired by the album. It was released on June 19, 2013. In Trebuchet Magazine's review of the album, Scott Laudati writes ... "Naked Raccoon works so well. A stripped down, track by track, acoustic replica of their first album. Released on June 19th, Naked Raccoon brings the curtain down on a full year of recording and touring under the ten tracks that we first heard on the plugged-in big brother, Velvet Raccoon."

In September 2013 Silent Old Mtns performed at the 2013 CBGB Music Festival in New York City.

== Hiatus (2013–14) ==
On November 4, 2013, Silent Old Mtns. abruptly announced an indefinite hiatus in a post on Facebook, stating "We are sad to inform all you beautiful and supportive people that Silent Old Mtns. is officially on an indefinite hiatus." No official final show was planned, their last performance had taken place at The Sidebar in Baltimore, MD a month earlier on October 16, 2013—a Wednesday night. An official explanation was not given for the sudden break up, but in January 2014 Pat Acuna described the group's last months in an anonymous interview about his experiences in the band, posted to YouTube.

In October 2014 (one year after Silent Old Mtns' last performance), lead singer Andrew Bromhal posted an open letter to the band's official Facebook page, claiming responsibility for the break up. Citing a general desire to improve his life as reasons for dissolving the band, he also noted that he and the other band members are "moving on with life", seemingly suggesting that a reunion is unlikely.

== Reunion (2015–16) ==
In summer 2015 it was announced that Silent Old Mtns would be reuniting for at least one show, sponsored by the Frederick News-Post and located at their historic and defunct printing warehouse in downtown Frederick, MD. The show was extremely popular, and calls for a full reunion were immediate. Frederick Playlist statied "We can only hope that Silent Old Mtns. reminded themselves of why they should be playing music from now until forever (especially when we heard the crowd chant "Dead All The Time" from backstage; my goodness, if that doesn't inspire ...)".

After the reunion show a post was made to the band's website regarding their future, stating – "Honestly, I don't have any real news to report. There isn't some secret record that we’ve been sitting on for two years. There's not much more than the five of us getting together to make music again. That's all we got. Who knows what that means. I'm not making any huge promises or trying to tease you all reading this. We’re all in different places in our lives now, but we all know that we want to keep spending time with one another and working on the music that we love to create. The future is wide open."

In the months after the reunion, the Frederick News-Post printed an article stating that their old historic offices had been repurposed as rehearsal and recording studios, and that Silent Old Mtns was using one of the rooms as a practice space. Additionally a second live show was announced, suggesting that the band would continue to further their reunion.

In late 2015 it was announced that Silent Old Mtns would be featured on a compilation album distributed by Flying Dog Brewery, their first release of new music since reuniting. Frederick - Volume One was released on October 10, 2015, and featured Trenches, the first new single by Silent Old Mtns in over 3 years. In an interview with Frederick Playlist, Samuel Whalen said of the track – "While we were on hiatus for a spell, it was the song that would get stuck in my head the most. It's been great to work on a song that's been stewing for so long. Each of us in the band has more time and experience that we’ve put into (it)."

Shortly after the release of Trenches, drummer Pat Acuna was interviewed by the Frederick News Post. During the interview he gave insight to the state of the band, saying; "As of now, we’re being very reserved with booking gigs. We don't want to over do it yet, but we are practicing every week, and we’re working on new material. ...We don't have any tangible news for a new record, but I don't think anyone spends time writing and developing music without the desire to eventually record it. We’re definitely going into 2016 looking for new opportunities. I think it's probably safe to say that there's more cool stuff on the horizon. From the inside, it definitely feels like we’re back."

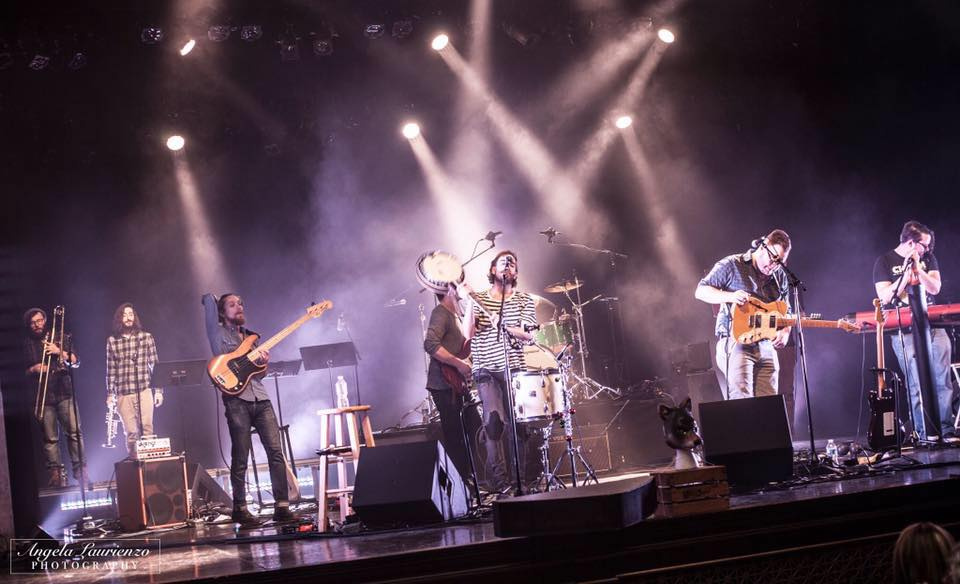
Live in 2016

Silent Old Mtns started 2016 with a blog post that finally cemented their status as an active band, announcing a new member and a performance at the historic Weinberg Center in Frederick, MD. In this release, Alex Stack was named as Silent Old Mtns' fourth bass player. At this show they performed another new song titled Brian Don't Go. The performance was described by Frederick Playlist's Nick Ring as "...a verifiable smorgasbord of instruments and attitudes, their music filled the performance hall thoroughly, bringing young fans bopping to their feet and singing along to cinematic crowd-favorites like Trenches... You have to enjoy a band that can successfully blend electric guitar, bass, drums, keys, banjo, slide guitar, mandolin, and melodica, all while hitting three-part vocal harmonies and having a good time."

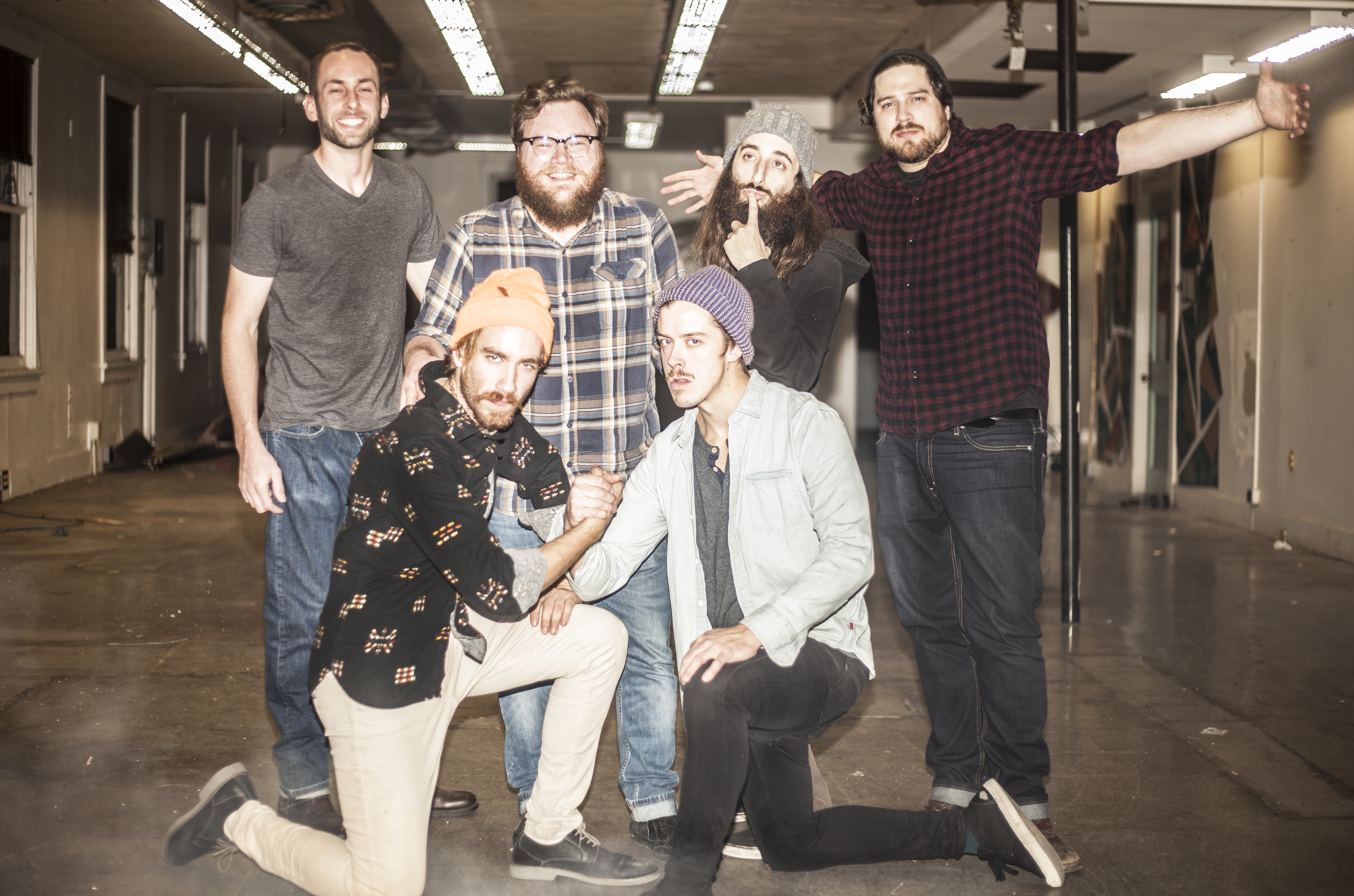
2017 promotional photo

In a September 2016 interview, it was announced that founding member and pianist, Thom Huenger, was leaving the band. No reason was made public. He was replaced by former Mtns' bassist, Colin Shultzaberger, now playing the keyboard.

In the same interview the band stated that they have hopes to record a new album in the near future. Drummer Pat Acuna stated, "An album, I hope, is in the pretty not too far off range. We have a really decent amount of material. You don't create that unless you want to record. No one wants to spend the willpower and time creating music without somehow wanting to lay it down."

== Gary (2019) ==
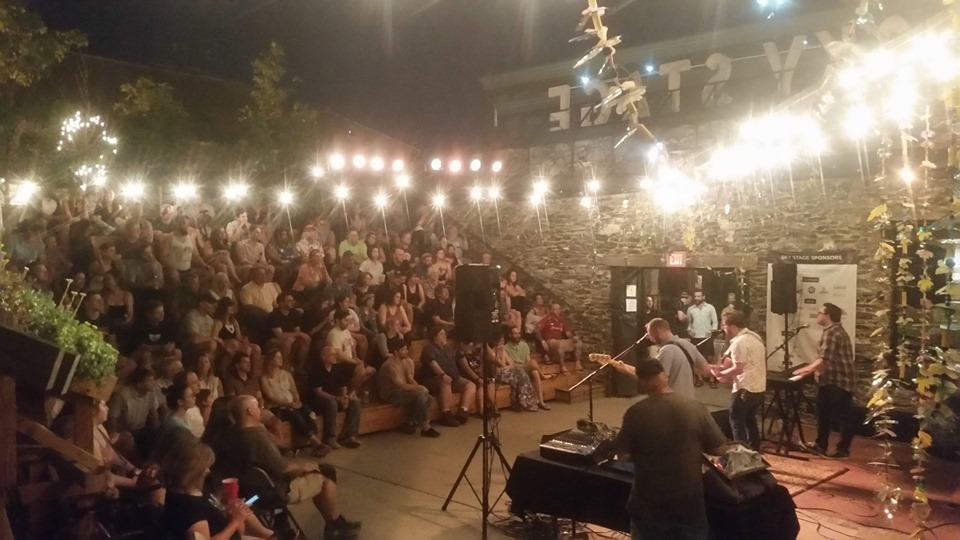
Silent Old Mtns performing at Sky Stage Amphitheater in Frederick Maryland

In a post to Facebook, Pat Acuna announced that MTNS were entering the studio in August 2017 to begin work on a new album at Mystery Ton Studios, with producer Kenny Eaton.

During this time it was announced that bassist Alex Stack would be leaving the band, though he would be featured on the new album. Touring member Jared Davis was named as a temporary replacement.

In a November post to Facebook, producer Kenny Eaton revealed that Silent Old Mtns had participated in a Frederick One Take session. It was released on 12/19/17, and was the official first look at Silent Old Mtns new single, "Submarines".

In December 2017 it was announced that John Fenker would be the Mtns sixth bassist. He made his debut with the band at The Ottobar in Baltimore, MD on January 5, 2018.

In a post to Facebook, Acuna confirmed that the follow-up to 2012's Velvet Raccoon would be released before the end of 2019, titled Gary.

== Discography ==
=== Studio albums ===
- Velvet Raccoon (2012)
- Naked Raccoon (2013)
- Gary (2019)

=== Singles ===
- Dead All The Time (2012)
- Beautiful Animals (2013)
- Trenches (2015)
- People (2019)
- 10 & 2 (2019)

=== Live Recordings ===
- Live Acoustic – YouTube Session (2011)
- The Blue Plate Special Radio Program: WDVX Knoxville (2012)
- Daytrotter Session: A Smell And A Feel Somewhere Down The Line (2013)
- Frederick One Take: Holiday Edition (2017)

=== Compilation Albums ===
- Frederick - Volume One (2015)

== Band members ==
=== Current Members ===
- Andrew Bromhal - Lead Vocals, Guitar (2010–present)
- Pat Acuña - Drums, Vocals (2011– Present)
- Thom Huenger – Piano, Vocals (2011– 2016, 2019–present)
- Samuel Whalen - Banjo, Percussion, Spoken Word, Melodica, Vocals (2011– Present)
- Joe Jalette – Lead Guitar, Lap Steel, Mandolin, Vocals (2012– Present)
- Colin Shultzaberger – Keyboards (2013, 2016–present)
- John Fenker – Bass Guitar (2018–present)

=== Former Members ===
- Alex Stack – Bass Guitar, Vocals (2016–2017)
- Steve Younkins – Bass Guitar (2011–2013)

=== Touring Members ===
- Jared Davis – Bass Guitar (2017)
- Brian Weakly – Bass Guitar, Trombone (2015)
