= Velvet Raccoon =

Studio album by Silent Old Mtns
- Released: June 19, 2012
- Recorded: August 2011–March 2012 at the Key Facility, Monrovia, Maryland
- Genre: Indie folk, indie rock
- Length: 48:06
- Producer: Myles Vlachos

Silent Old Mtns chronology
| Velvet Raccoon (2012) | Naked Raccoon (2013) |

Professional ratings
Review scores
| Source | Rating |
|---|---|
| Live Music Guide | 8/10 stars |
| Frederick News-Post | 4/4 stars |

Velvet Raccoon is the debut studio album of American indie rock band Silent Old Mtns, released on June 19, 2012. Recording began in August 2011 with producer Myles Vlachos at the Key Facility in Monrovia, Maryland, and was finished in March 2012. The album was named after a velvet painting of a raccoon that drummer Pat Acuña purchased at a flea market while living in Nashville, Tennessee. Its lead single, Dead All The Time, was released along with a music video on March 22, 2012.

Critical response to Velvet Raccoon was generally positive, receiving an 8/10 when reviewed by Live Music Guide, calling it "...the first step of a visionary band with an honest and original sound." Muzik Dizcovery's Casey Whitman, wrote "Velvet Raccoon is hard to classify and unconventional, but the band has made an enormous leap, blowing away even my high expectations."

== Track listing ==
1. "Ash and Bone" - 3:24
2. "That Telescope Find" - 5:34
3. "Under Oak" - 3:10
4. "You've Got Your Sights On Me Now" - 3:55
5. "Dead All The Time" - 4:57
6. "Monsters" - 6:58
7. "The Most Logical Thing" - 3:32
8. "Old Man" - 4:05
9. "Mine To Give" - 5:40
10. "Pigeons" - 6:51

== Personnel ==
- Andrew Bromhal - lead vocals, guitar
- Samuel Whalen - banjo, spoken word, vocals
- Thom Huenger - piano, vocals
- Pat Acuña - drums, vocals
- Steve Younkins - bass guitar, vocals
- Myles Vlachos - additional instrumentation
