= Frederick City Police Department (Maryland) =

Coordinates: 39.413701°N 77.413082°W

- Abbreviation: FPD

Jurisdictional structure
- Operations jurisdiction: Maryland, United States
- Frederick City Police Districts
- Area: 57.50 km²
- Population: 78,000
- Legal jurisdiction: Frederick, Maryland
- General nature: Local civilian police

Operational structure
- Headquarters: 100 East All Saints Street, Frederick, MD 21701
- Officers: 155
- Agency executive: Jason Lando, Chief of Police

Website
- link

The Frederick City Police Department (FPD) is a law enforcement organization that provides police services to the city of Frederick, Maryland, the second-largest city in that state. The department is organized into several divisions, and is responsible for policing more than 78,000 people in a land area of 22.9 square miles. FPD is headed by Jason Lando, who was appointed Chief of Police in March, 2021 replacing outgoing Chief Ed Hargis who resigned in 2020.

== History ==
In 1745, Daniel Dulany, a lawyer and land developer, founded "Frederick town" on a feeder creek of the Monocacy River. Frederick became incorporated in 1817 and had a population of 3,640. Four town constables were appointed that year to provide security on the streets and enforce animal laws.

The Police Department was created in 1858. At that time, there was a captain and two constables. The department staff eventually increased the following years and quickly followed other major cities' models. During the later stages of the American Civil War, the city jail served as the basis for a "contraband camp" for displaced Black people.

== Organization ==
As of 2024, the department had 146 sworn officers and about 50 civilians in several divisions. Its headquarters are located just outside the Frederick County courthouse on West Patrick Street. Like many law enforcement agencies across the country, community policing is an important part of its core services provided to the citizens of Frederick.

FPD also has an auxiliary unit composed of uniformed volunteer officers to supplement regular officers. Auxiliary officers perform essential support duties and assist sworn police officers in their daily activities as well as during special events.

The FPD consists of several divisions, including:

- Criminal Investigation Division
- Patrol Division 1
- Patrol Division 2
- Professional Services Division
- Special Operations Division
- Support Services Division
- Technology and Services Division

== Training ==
FPD has its own police academy, certified by the Maryland Training Police Commission. The department trains not only its own officers, but also cadets from surrounding jurisdictions including the Frederick County Sheriff's Office, the Washington County Sheriff's Office and the Brunswick Police Department. Additionally, the academy periodically trains prospects for the auxiliary police force.

== Misconduct ==
=== Perjury ===
In October 2010, Officer Megan Mattingly resigned after it was alleged that she had lied under oath in court.

=== DUI ===
In March 2012, Officer Robert Pierce was arrested after he crashed his patrol car into a guardrail. He was believed to have been driving under the influence when he lost control of the car on U.S. 15 at Jefferson Street, and was off duty at the time. He was sentenced to 2 years of unsupervised probation and 48 hours of community service.

In June 2015, Officer Deborah Kidwell was arrested in the Boonsboro area by Washington County deputies after a vehicle accident. She was charged with DUI offense. She was sentenced to Probation Before Judgement.

=== Domestic violence ===
In June 2012, Frederick Police Corporal Martin Holt, who was an assistant supervisor of the midnight shift, was charged with assaulting his live-in girlfriend by hitting her several times in the chest and once in the back, according to the Frederick Police Department. He was sentenced to Probation before Judgement.

In April 2014, Officer Benjamin Whitmore pleaded guilty to charges of assaulting his girlfriend, who was also a Frederick City Police Officer. He was sentenced to Probation Before Judgement, with 18 months of supervised probation. He ran into trouble again in February 2015 when he was taken into custody by Washington County deputies after a brief chase in Hagerstown. He was reportedly intoxicated. "Frederick officer pleads guilty to assaulting girlfriend".

=== Fraud and theft ===
In October 2013, Officer Charity Faith Hoxie agreed to resign from the department and "not work in law enforcement for three years." This was part of a deal that suspended charges against her for using stolen gift cards in nearby Hagerstown.

== See also ==
- List of law enforcement agencies in Maryland
