= USS Frederick =

USS Frederick may refer to:

- USS Frederick (CA-8) laid down in 1901 as USS Maryland (ACR-8); renamed Frederick in 1916; decommissioned 1922
- USS Frederick (LST-1184), a Newport-class tank landing ship, commissioned in 1970 and decommissioned in 2002
