= John L. Harding =

American politician

John Lackland Harding
- Born: May 3, 1780
- Died: October 15, 1837
- Occupation(s): Mayor; Chief Justice
- Spouse(s): Eleanora Marshall (1804-1816); Eleanor Mantz (1820-1837)

John Lackland Harding (1780 – October 15, 1837) was an American politician from Maryland. He served as mayor of Frederick, Maryland.

== Personal life ==
John Lackland Harding was born on May 3, 1780. He was married to Eleanora Marshall on May 31, 1804. She died on March 31, 1816. After the death of his first wife, he was re-married to Eleanor Mantz on March 20, 1820. John L. Harding died on October 15, 1837.

== Career ==
=== War of 1812 ===
John L. Harding volunteered to serve, and was as a private under Captain Henry Steiner during the War of 1812. His company was made up of volunteers that served as an artillery division, receiving high praise for their conduct and efforts on Louderslagers Hill at the Battle of North Point.

=== Mayoralty ===
In the February 15, 1823 issue of the Frederick Town Herald, John Lackland Harding announced his decision to run for Mayor. His appeal states:

"Fellow Citizens,

From the solicitation of my friends, I am induced to offer myself to your consideration as a candidate for the MAYORALTY at the ensuing election; and if elected, will enforce the ordinances of the corporation of justice, moderation and strict impartiality; and will recommend useful and economical expenditures only, so that taxes may be reduced to suit the present pressure of the times. - John L. Harding"

John L. Harding became Mayor of Frederick, Maryland in 1823, and held the office until 1826.

During Harding's tenure as Mayor, The Marquis de La Fayette and his son Georges Washington de La Fayette came to Frederick, and Mayor Harding participated in a welcoming party for them.

=== Chief Justice ===
Several years after his tenure as Mayor ended, Harding was appointed as Chief Justice of the Orphan's Court, in which he served from 1831 to 1835.
