= Harding (surname) =

Harding is a surname of Anglo-Saxon English origin. The surname is primarily found in England, the United States, Canada, Australia, New Zealand and parts of Africa, such as Sierra Leone. Despite the surname having English Origins, the USA has the highest amount of people with the surname (53,232 with the surname are Americans) and Sierra Leone has the highest concentration of people bearing the surname (51st most common surname in the country).

The surname comes from Old English, coming from the word ''Hearding'' the word ''Heard'' meaning Brave/Strong/Hard and the suffix ''ing'' meaning "son of", Therefore the name literally translates to "Son of the Brave One"

Also, the name has Irish roots. From 2 distinct Irish Clans. The Ó hIarnáin, meaning "Descendent of the Iron-Strong One" and Mac an Bhaird, meaning "Son of the Poet", but when the English arrived, they Anglicised (sounded out) the surnames (Ó hIarnáin and Mac an Bhaird) to the English surname "Harding" due to their similar sounds.

== Real people ==
- Aaron Harding (1805–1875), American politician
- Abi Harding, English saxophonist
- Abner C. Harding (1807–1874), American politician
- Alan Harding (born 1948), English footballer
- Albert Austin Harding (1880–1958), First Director of Bands at the University of Illinois
- Anita Harding (1952–1995), British neurologist
- Ann Harding (1901–1981), American actress
- Antony Harding (fl. c. 2000), English singer
- Arthur Harding (1878–1947), Wales and British Isles rugby union international player
- Austie Harding (1917–1991), ice hockey player
- Baron Harding of Petherton, English peerage
- Ben Harding (born 1984), English footballer
- Ben Harding (guitarist) (born 1965), English guitarist, vocalist and songwriter
- Benjamin F. Harding (1823–1899), American politician
- Brent Harding (born 1967), American bass player
- Buster Harding (1912–1965), Canadian jazz pianist
- C. B. Harding, American film director
- Charles R. Harding (c.1866 – ?), aka 'Wag' Harding, English champion sculler
- Chester Harding (disambiguation)
- Çiğdem Balım Harding, American academic
- Clare Harding (1895–1973), English horsewoman
- Dale Harding (artist), Australian artist, subject of a 2019 exhibition at the Institute of Modern Art, Brisbane
- Dan Harding (born 1983), English footballer
- Daniel Harding (born 1975), British conductor
- David Harding (disambiguation)
- Donald Harding (1949–1992), American serial robber and spree killer
- Douglas Harding (1909–2007), English mystic and author
- Duncan Harding (1926–2007), pseudonym of Charles Whiting
- Edwin F. Harding (1886–1970), military commander
- Elizabeth Ya Eli Harding (born 1956), Gambian diplomat
- Eric Harding (born 1972), American boxer
- Fitz Harding (born 1999), rugby union player
- Francis Pym Harding (1821–1875), English army general
- Florence Harding (1860–1924), First Lady of the United States
- Georg Harding (born 1981), Australian rules footballer
- George Frederick Harding (1858–1927), Wales international rugby union player
- George M. Harding (1827–1910), American architect
- George Harding, 8th Baron Berkeley (1601–1658), seventeenth-century English nobleman
- Gerald Lankester Harding (1901–1979), British archaeologist
- Gilbert Harding (1907–1960), British journalist
- Greg Harding (born 1976), Australian rules footballer
- Hamish Harding (1964–2023), British businessman
- Hamish Harding (rower) (born 1999), Australian rower
- Harding of Bristol (c. 1048 – c. 1125), son of Eadnoth the Constable
- Harold Harding (1900–1986), British civil engineer
- Harry Harding (disambiguation)
- Ian Harding (born 1986), American actor
- Israel Harding (1833–1917), English recipient of the Victoria Cross
- Jack Harding (1898–1963), American football coach
- Jack Harding (hurler) (1933–2020), Irish hurler
- Jaime Harding, English pop singer
- James Harding (disambiguation)
- Jamie Harding (born 1979), English actor
- Jeff Harding (disambiguation)
- Jeremy Harding (born 1952), British writer and journalist
- Jesper Harding (1799–1865), American publisher
- John Harding (disambiguation)
- Joseph Harding (1805–1876), English cheesemaker
- Josh Harding (born 1984), Canadian ice hockey player
- June Harding (1940–2019), American actress
- Karl Ludwig Harding (1765–1834), German astronomer
- Keith Harding (born 1938), Scottish politician
- Kenneth R. Harding (1914–2007), American politician
- Laurie Harding (born 1947), American politician
- Laverne Harding (1905–1984), American animator
- Lee Harding (born 1983), Australian singer
- Lee Harding (writer) (1937–2023), Australian writer
- Leigh Harding (born 1981), Australian rules footballer
- Lindsey Harding (born 1984), American basketball player
- Lyn Harding (1867–1952), Welsh actor who appeared in British made silent films, talkies and radio
- Major B. Harding (born 1935), American attorney
- Mark Hardinges (born 1978), English cricketer
- Maria Harding, Canadian mayor
- Mary Esther Harding (1888–1971), American Jungian analyst
- Matt Harding (born 1976), computer game designer
- Matt Harding (musician) (born 1975), British musician
- Matthew Harding (1953–1996), British businessman
- Maurice Harding, birth name of Mopreme Shakur (born 1967); American rapper
- Meg Harding (born 1945), American politician from Missouri
- Michael Harding (born 1953), Irish writer
- Mike Harding (born 1944), English comedian and singer
- Natasha Harding (born 1989), Welsh association football player
- Nicholas Harding (1956–2022), Australian artist
- Nicholas Mark Harding (born 1964), English writer
- Oliver P. Harding (1822–1900), American politician from Maryland
- Oswald Harding (1935–2026), Jamaican politician
- Paul Harding (disambiguation)
- Peter Harding (disambiguation)
- Phil Harding (disambiguation)
- Phyllis Harding (1907–1992), English swimmer
- Prince Harding, Sierra Leone politician
- Ralph R. Harding (1929–2006), Idaho congressman
- Randolph Harding (1914–1996), Canadian politician
- Reggie Harding (1942–1972), American basketball player
- Richard Harding (born 1953), English rugby union player
- Rodney Harding (born 1962), Canadian American-football player
- Ross Harding (1948–2006), pseudonym of David Gemmell
- Rowe Harding (1901–1991), Welsh rugby union player
- Ryan Harding (born 1984), Scottish soccer player
- Sam Harding (rugby union) (born 1980), New Zealand rugby union footballer
- Sam Harding (athlete) (born 1991), Australian Paralympic athlete
- Samuel Harding (American football) (1873–1919), American football coach
- Sandra Harding (born 1935), American philosopher
- Sarah Harding (1981–2021), member of the British group Girls Aloud
- Sarah Harding (lama) (born 1951), Buddhist teacher and translator
- Seth Harding (1734–1814), officer in the US Navy
- Stephen Harding (died 1134), Christian saint
- Stephen Harding (cricketer), English cricketer of the mid-18th century
- Stephen S. Harding (1808–1891), Utah politician
- Ted Harding (1921–2004), Australian politician
- Theo Harding (1860–1919), Wales rugby union player
- Tim Harding (musician) (born 1978), Australian entertainer
- Tim Harding (chess player) (born 1948)
- Tanya Harding (born 1972), Australian softball player
- Thomas Harding (1448–1532), 16th-century religious dissident
- Tony Harding (1942–2014), British illustrator
- Tonya Harding (born 1970), American figure skater
- Traci Harding (born 1964), Australian novelist
- Trevor Harding, Canadian politician
- Valerie Campbell-Harding (1932–2006), Canadian textile designer
- Vanessa Harding (born 1970), American wrestler
- Vic Harding (1952–1979), English speedway rider
- Vincent Harding (1931–2014), African-American historian
- Walter Harding (1917–1996), American academic
- Warren Harding (climber) (1924–2002)
- Warren G. Harding (1865–1923), 29th president of the United States
- Weylan Harding (born 1972), American football coach
- William Harding (disambiguation)
- Zay Harding (born 1974), American television personality and actor

== Fictional characters ==
- Ace Harding, a character in Deja Vue video game
- Angela Harding, a character from the video game Avatar: Frontiers of Pandora
- Cyrus Harding, a fictional character created by Jules Verne
- Dale Harding, a character in One Flew Over the Cuckoo's Nest
- Leyla Harding, a fictional character in British soap Emmerdale
- Tess Harding, a fictional character created by Jason Katims
- Septimus Harding, protagonist of Trollope's The Warden.
