= 1923 in Australian soccer =

The 1923 season was the 40th season of regional competitive soccer in Australia.

== National teams ==
=== Australia men's national soccer team ===
Australia hosted their first international match at Brisbane Cricket Ground on 9 June against New Zealand, with seven players making their national team debuts resulting in a 2–1 win through Percy Lennard scoring early on and William Maunder scoring in the last minute recording Australia's first win in an international match. Ahead of the second match against New Zealand at Sydney Cricket Ground on 16 June, Jack Gilmore and Johnny Peebles were set to make their debuts for Australia; as Australia lost 3–2 with Percy Lennard scoring again and Jack Gilmore scoring on debut. A fortnights time later until Australia's last match in 1923 against New Zealand at Newcastle Showground saw Bob Austin start as their goalkeeper; the first time since George Cartwright started as Australia's first goalkeeper, and further fellow debutants Judy Masters, Ernie Owen, and Gilbert Storey. The final match resulted in a 4–1 loss with William Maunder scoring for Australia, and finishing the three-match series with one win and two losses.

==== Friendlies ====
9 June 1923	Australia	2–1	New Zealand	Brisbane, Australia
	Lennard 7'; Maunder 90'	Report	Dacre 57'	Stadium: Brisbane Cricket Ground; Attendance: 7,000; Referee: A. Jackson (Australia)

16 June 1923	Australia	2–3	New Zealand	Sydney, Australia
	Lennard (?); Gilmore (?)	Report	Campbell (?)	Stadium: Sydney Cricket Ground; Attendance: 12,000; Referee: W.A. Wright (Australia)

30 June 1923	Australia	1–4	New Zealand	Newcastle, Australia
	Lennard (?); Gilmore (?)	Report	Campbell (?)	Stadium: Newcastle Showground; Attendance: 15,000; Referee: L.B. Tamlyn (Australia)

=== Player statistics ===
Pos.	Player	Apps.	Goals
GK	Bob Austin	1	0
GK	George Cartwright	2	0
FB	Cliff Gedge	3	0
FB	Ernie Owen	1	0
FB	Sid Robinson	1	0
HB	Alex Gibb	3	0
HB	Peter Doyle	1	0
HB	Jimmy Love	1	0
HB	Johnny Peebles	1	0
HB	Gilbert Storey	1	0
HB	Jack White	2	0
FW	Mosie Burton	1	0
FW	Jack Gilmore	1	1
FW	Percy Lennard	3	2
FW	Judy Masters	1	0
FW	William Maunder	3	2
FW	William Mitchell	3	0
FW	Tom Thompson	3	0

== League competitions ==
Federation	Competition	Grand Final			Regular Season		
Federation	Competition	Champions	Score	Runners-up	Winners	Runners-up	Third place
Northern District British Football Association	Northern NSW Football League	Weston	3–1	Adamstown Rosebud	Wallsend Rovers	Adamstown Rosebud	West Wallsend Bluebells
Australian Soccer Association	Sydney Metropolitan First Division	Granville	Unknown		Granville	Balmain Fernleigh	Unknown
Queensland British Football Association	Brisbane Area League	Thistle	5–1	Bundamba Rangers	Dinmore Bush Rats	Thistle	Bundamba Rangers
South Australian British Football Association	South Australian Metropolitan League	Not played			Cheltenham	South Adelaide	North Adelaide
Tasmanian Soccer Association	Tasmanian Division One	South Hobart	4–2	Elphin	Unknown		
Anglo-Australian Football Association	Victorian League Division One	Not played			St Kilda	Footscray Thistle	Play-off
Western Australian Soccer Football Association	Western Australian Division One	Not played			Claremont	Thistle	Northern Casuals

== Cup competitions ==
Federation	Competition	Winners	Runners-up	Venue	Result
Northern District British Football Association	Ellis Cup	Weston	Adamstown Rosebud	–	3–2
New South Wales British Football Association	Gardiner Challenge Cup	West Wallsend (4/4)	Sydney (0/2)	–	1–0 (R)
South Australian British Football Association	South Australian Federation Cup	Prospect United (1/0)	South Adelaide (1/3)	–	2–1 (R)
Tasmanian Soccer Association	Falkinder Cup	Sandy Bay (1/0)	Hobart (0/2)	–	3–1
Anglo-Australian Football Association	Dockerty Cup	St Kilda (2/2)	Preston (0/2)	–	1–0

(Note: figures in parentheses display the club's competition record as winners/runners-up.)

== See also ==
- Soccer in Australia
