= Harding =

Harding may refer to:

== People ==
- Harding (surname)
  - Warren G. Harding, 29th president of the United States
- Maureen Harding Clark (born 1946), Irish jurist

== Places ==
=== Australia ===
- Harding River

=== Iran ===
- Harding, Iran, a village in South Khorasan Province

=== South Africa ===
- Harding, KwaZulu-Natal

=== United States ===
- Harding, Georgia
- Harding, Illinois
- Harding, Kansas
- Harding, Minnesota
- Harding Township, New Jersey
- Harding, South Dakota
- Harding, West Virginia
- Harding, Wisconsin
- Harding County, New Mexico
- Harding County, South Dakota
- Harding Home, home and future presidential center of US president Warren G. Harding, in Marion, Ohio
- Harding Icefield, Alaska
- Harding Senior High School (St. Paul, Minnesota)
- Harding Township, Lucas County, Ohio
- Harding University, a private college located in Searcy, Arkansas, United States
- Harding University High School, a public high school in Charlotte, North Carolina
- Lake Harding, Georgia
- Lake Harding (Minnesota)
- Chester Harding House, historic house in Massachusetts
- Sarah H. Harding House, a historical building in Andover, Massachusetts

=== Elsewhere ===
- Harding oilfield
- Harding (crater), a small lunar impact crater

== Other uses ==
- USS Harding (DD-91), destroyer

== See also ==
- Hardinge (disambiguation)
- Justice Harding (disambiguation)
