= List of Australia men's international soccer players (2–3 caps) =

The Australia national football team represents the country of Australia in international association football. It is fielded by Football Australia, the governing body of soccer in Australia, and competes as a member of the Asian Football Confederation (AFC), which encompasses the countries of Asia.

Australia have competed in numerous competitions, and all players who have played in two or three matches, either as a member of the starting eleven or as a substitute, are listed below. Each player's details include his usual playing position while with the team, the number of caps earned and goals scored in all international matches, and details of the first and most recent matches played in. The names are initially ordered by date of debut, and then by alphabetical order. All statistics are correct up to and including the match played against Lebanon on 21 March 2024.

== Key ==
Player
This colour background and the * symbol indicate that the player was active at club level and eligible to play for Australia on the date specified above.

Positions key
pre–1960s		1960s–present	
GK	Goalkeeper		
FB	Full back	DF	Defender
HB	Half back	MF	Midfielder
FW	Forward		

Position
Playing positions are listed according to the tactical formations that were employed at the time. Thus the change in the names of defensive and midfield positions reflects the tactical evolution that occurred from the 1960s onwards.
Caps and goals
Caps and goals comprise those in the FIFA World Cup, OFC Nations Cup, AFC Asian Cup, their associated qualification matches and international friendly tournaments and matches.

== Players ==
Australia national soccer team players with 2 or 3 caps
Player	Pos.	Caps	Goals	Debut		Last or most recent match		Refs.
Player	Pos.	Caps	Goals	Date	Opponent	Date	Opponent	Refs.
Dave Cumberford	DF	3	0	17 June 1922	New Zealand	8 July 1922	New Zealand	
Jock Cumberford	MF	3	0	17 June 1922	New Zealand	8 July 1922	New Zealand	
Allen Fisher	DF	3	0	17 June 1922	New Zealand	8 July 1922	New Zealand	
Clarence Shenton	DF	3	0	17 June 1922	New Zealand	8 July 1922	New Zealand	
Cliff Gedge	DF	3	0	9 June 1923	New Zealand	30 June 1923	New Zealand	
Percy Lennard	FW	3	0	9 June 1923	New Zealand	30 June 1923	New Zealand	
William Mitchell	FW	3	0	9 June 1923	New Zealand	30 June 1923	New Zealand	
Jack White	DF	3	0	9 June 1923	New Zealand	7 June 1924	Canada	
William Owen	DF	3	0	30 June 1923	New Zealand	28 June 1924	Canada	
Stan Bourke		3	0	14 June 1924	Canada	26 July 1924	Canada	
James Donaldson		3	0	5 June 1933	New Zealand	18 July 1936	New Zealand	
Charlie O'Connor		3	0	5 June 1933	New Zealand	24 June 1933	New Zealand	
Alec Forrest		3	0	4 July 1936	New Zealand	1 October 1938	India	
Jim Harden		3	0	4 July 1936	New Zealand	18 July 1936	New Zealand	
Billy Price		3	6	4 July 1936	New Zealand	18 July 1936	New Zealand	
Dick Kemp		3	0	31 May 1947	South Africa	14 June 1947	South Africa	
Angus Drennan		3	0	28 August 1948	New Zealand	11 September 1948	New Zealand	
Lou Hearne		3	0	14 August 1954	New Zealand	4 September 1954	New Zealand	
Colin Kitching		3	0	3 September 1955	South Africa	12 December 1956	India	
Cliff Almond		3	0	10 September 1955	South Africa	1 October 1955	South Africa	
George Arthur		3	0	27 November 1956	Japan	12 December 1956	India	
Graham McMillan		3	1	27 November 1956	Japan	12 December 1956	India	
Brian Vogler		3	2	12 December 1956	India	23 August 1958	New Zealand	
Ron Giles		3	0	26 November 1965	Cambodia	28 May 1967	Scotland	
Ian Johnston		3	1	26 November 1965	Cambodia	8 December 1965	Malaysia	
John Giacometti		3	0	28 May 1967	Scotland	3 June 1967	Scotland	
David Zeman		3	0	20 October 1969	South Korea	4 December 1969	Israel	
Jim Armstrong		3	1	9 October 1972	New Zealand	24 October 1972	South Korea	
Bogdan Nyskohus		3	0	9 October 1972	New Zealand	29 October 1972	Philippines	
John Davies		3	0	11 August 1976	Hong Kong	18 June 1978	Greece	
Kevin Mullen		3	0	11 August 1976	Hong Kong	12 June 1980	Northern Ireland	
Paul Kay		3	0	26 February 1980	Papua New Guinea	6 September 1981	Taiwan	
Peter Tredinnick		3	0	4 December 1983	China	18 December 1983	Singapore	
Steve Calderan		3	0	12 March 1989	New Zealand	2 April 1989	New Zealand	
David Lowe		3	0	6 February 1991	Czechoslovakia	15 May 1991	New Zealand	
Aytek Genc		3	1	12 May 1991	New Zealand	18 January 1997	New Zealand	
Mike Grbevski		3	0	8 July 1992	Croatia	11 August 1992	Malaysia	
Darren Stewart		3	0	8 July 1992	Croatia	26 September 1992	Solomon Islands	
Francis Awaritefe		3	1	24 September 1993	South Korea	10 February 1996	Japan	
Ross Aloisi		3	0	24 September 1994	Kuwait	6 June 1998	Croatia	
Sean Cranney		3	0	10 November 1995	New Zealand	18 September 1996	South Africa	
George Kulcsar		3	0	23 April 1996	Chile	12 March 1997	Macedonia	
Robert Trajkovski		3	0	22 January 1997	South Korea	2 October 1998	Tahiti	
Joel Griffiths		3	1	9 October 2005	Jamaica	23 May 2008	Ghana	
Shane Stefanutto		3	0	24 March 2007	China	5 September 2009	South Korea	
Danny Allsopp	FW	3	0	2 June 2007	Uruguay	28 January 2009	Indonesia	
Nathan Coe	GK	3	0	5 January 2011	United Arab Emirates	7 October 2011	Malaysia	
Adam Sarota	DF	3	0	10 August 2011	Wales	6 September 2012	Lebanon	
Terry Antonis *	MF	3	0	3 December 2012	Hong Kong	9 December 2012	Taiwan	
Matt Smith	MF	3	0	3 December 2012	Hong Kong	7 December 2012	Guam	
Tarek Elrich *	DF	3	0	30 March 2015	Macedonia	8 October 2015	Jordan	
Dimitri Petratos *	MF	3	0	23 March 2018	Norway	7 June 2019	South Korea	
Thomas Deng *	DF	3	0	15 October 2018	Kuwait	28 March 2023	Ecuador	
Nicholas D'Agostino *	FW	3	0	29 March 2022	Saudi Arabia	9 September 2023	Mexico	
Jason Cummings *	FW	3	1	25 September 2022	New Zealand	28 March 2023	Ecuador	
George Brown	FW	2	1	24 June 1922	New Zealand	8 July 1922	New Zealand	
Sid Robinson	DF	2	0	9 June 1923	New Zealand	16 June 1923	New Zealand	
Jack Gilmore	FW	2	0	16 June 1923	New Zealand	28 June 1924	Canada	
Andy Henderson		2	0	7 June 1924	Canada	14 June 1924	Canada	
Cecil Williams		2	0	28 June 1924	Canada	12 July 1924	Canada	
Vic Sharp		2	0	4 July 1936	New Zealand	11 July 1936	New Zealand	
Alf Henwood		2	0	3 September 1938	India	17 September 1938	India	
Alf Quill		2	2	3 September 1938	India	24 September 1938	India	
Cec Brittain		2	0	10 September 1938	India	17 September 1938	India	
Dave Coote		2	0	10 May 1947	South Africa	24 May 1947	South Africa	
Ted Drain		2	0	10 May 1947	South Africa	24 September 1955	South Africa	
Robert Murray		2	0	7 June 1947	South Africa	14 June 1947	South Africa	
Alec Duncan		2	0	4 September 1948	New Zealand	3 September 1955	South Africa	
Cyril Nichols		2	0	17 June 1950	Rhodesia	1 July 1950	South Africa	
Bill Murphy		2	1	4 September 1954	New Zealand	17 September 1955	South Africa	
Ralph Piercy		2	0	10 September 1955	South Africa	17 September 1955	South Africa	
Harry Murdoch		2	0	16 August 1958	New Zealand	23 August 1958	New Zealand	
Steve Herczeg	FW	2	0	24 November 1965	North Korea	3 December 1965	Chinese Taipei	
Peter Fuzes		2	0	28 May 1967	Scotland	3 June 1967	Scotland	
Ted de Lyster	FW	2	0	17 November 1967	Indonesia	21 November 1967	Singapore	
Sandy Irvine	DF	2	0	10 November 1970	Israel	2 December 1970	Mexico	
Terry Butler	FW	2	1	9 October 1972	New Zealand	29 October 1972	Philippines	
Duncan Cummings	FW	2	1	6 August 1975	China	11 August 1976	Hong Kong	
Richard Bell		2	0	11 August 1976	Hong Kong	20 October 1976	Indonesia	
Mendo Ristovski		2	0	11 August 1976	Hong Kong	11 June 1978	Greece	
Sebastian Giampaolo		2	0	18 June 1978	Greece	25 April 1981	New Zealand	
John O'Shea		2	0	18 June 1978	Greece	13 June 1979	New Zealand	
Joe Senkalski		2	0	18 June 1978	Greece	26 August 1980	Mexico	
Yakka Banovic		2	0	26 February 1980	Papua New Guinea	15 June 1980	Northern Ireland	
Billy Rogers		2	0	25 April 1981	New Zealand	16 May 1981	New Zealand	
Glenn Ahearn		2	0	30 August 1981	Indonesia	6 September 1981	Taiwan	
Grant Lee		2	0	30 August 1981	Indonesia	6 September 1981	Taiwan	
Mark Koussas		2	0	30 August 1981	Indonesia	6 September 1981	Taiwan	
Charlie Egan		2	0	6 October 1982	Thailand	11 October 1982	Indonesia	
Rod Brown		2	0	2 September 1987	New Zealand	9 September 1987	New Zealand	
Jean-Paul de Marigny	DF	2	0	15 November 1987	Taiwan	6 September 1990	South Korea	
Andrew Callanan		2	0	12 May 1991	New Zealand	15 May 1991	New Zealand	
John Filan		2	0	21 June 1992	Uruguay	2 April 1997	Hungary	
Tony Franken		2	0	14 August 1992	Indonesia	26 September 1992	Solomon Islands	
Gary Hasler		2	0	11 September 1992	Tahiti	26 September 1992	Solomon Islands	
Frank Juric	GK	2	0	10 November 1995	New Zealand	10 February 1996	Japan	
Paul Bilokapic	MF	2	0	7 February 1998	Chile	11 February 1998	South Korea	
Glenn Gwynne	DF	2	0	28 September 1998	Cook Islands	2 October 1998	Tahiti	
Michael Curcija	FW	2	0	4 October 2000	Kuwait	7 October 2000	South Korea	
Con Blatsis	DF	2	0	7 October 2000	South Korea	28 February 2001	Colombia	
Sasho Petrovski	FW	2	1	15 August 2001	Japan	16 August 2006	Kuwait	
Ante Covic	GK	2	0	22 February 2006	Bahrain	22 March 2008	Singapore	
Kristian Sarkies	MF	2	0	7 June 2006	Liechtenstein	22 June 2008	China	
Travis Dodd	FW	2	1	16 August 2006	Kuwait	11 October 2006	Bahrain	
Mark Bridge	FW	2	0	22 March 2008	Singapore	23 May 2008	Ghana	
Dean Heffernan	DF	2	1	28 January 2009	Indonesia	6 January 2010	Kuwait	
Paul Reid	MF	2	0	28 January 2009	Indonesia	5 March 2009	Kuwait	
Eli Babalj	FW	2	2	14 November 2012	South Korea	7 December 2012	Guam	
Dino Djulbic	DF	2	0	7 December 2012	Guam	9 December 2012	Taiwan	
Erik Paartalu	MF	2	0	20 July 2013	South Africa	28 July 2013	China	
Curtis Good *	DF	2	0	5 March 2014	South Africa	7 June 2021	Chinese Taipei	
Bernie Ibini-Isei	FW	2	0	10 October 2014	United Arab Emirates	14 October 2014	Qatar	
Ruon Tongyik *	DF	2	0	7 June 2021	Chinese Taipei	11 June 2021	Nepal	
Gianni Stensness *	MF	2	0	24 March 2022	Japan	29 March 2022	Saudi Arabia	
Cameron Devlin *	MF	2	0	25 September 2022	New Zealand	28 March 2023	Ecuador	
Alexander Robertson *	MF	2	0	24 March 2023	Ecuador	15 June 2023	Argentina	
Joe Gauci *	GK	2	0	28 March 2023	Ecuador	6 January 2024	Bahrain	
John Iredale *	FW	2	1	21 March 2024	Lebanon	26 March 2024	Lebanon	

== See also ==
- List of Australia international soccer players with one cap
- List of Australia international soccer players (4–9 caps)
- List of Australia international soccer players (10+ caps)
