= William Harding =

William Harding may refer to:

== Politics ==
- William Harding (politician) (1835–1903), Australian politician
- William L. Harding (1877–1934), Republican Governor of Iowa from 1917 to 1921, best remembered for the "Babel Proclamation"
- William Neville Harding (1893–1978), Lord Mayor of Sydney

== Sports ==
- William Harding (footballer) (1883–1967), English footballer
- William Harding (sport shooter) (1910–1936), American sports shooter
- Halley Harding (William Claire Halley Harding, 1904–1967), American baseball player and sportswriter

== Others ==
- William Harding (Virginia witch trials) (c. 1625), first person convicted of witchcraft in Virginia Colony
- William Harding (yeoman) (1643–1718), British yeoman and founder of a charity in 1719 to clothe and educate poor children in the hamlet of Walton, Aylesbury
- William Harding (antiquary) (1792–1886), antiquary and British army officer
- William Giles Harding (1808–1886), American heir, Southern planter, horse breeder and Confederate general
- William Harding (photographer) (1826–1899), British-born photographer in New Zealand
- William P. G. Harding (1864–1930), American banker, former Federal Reserve Chairman
- Ali Eisami (a.k.a. William Harding, born 1786/1787), Kanuri man who lived in Sierra Leone

== Other uses ==
- William Harding Combined School in Elm Farm, Aylesbury, England

== See also ==
- William Harding Carter (1851–1925), U.S. soldier
- William Harding Jackson (1901–1971), Deputy Director of the CIA in the 1950s
