= Sarah Harding (disambiguation) =

Sarah Harding (1981–2021) was an English singer and actress, best known for being a member of the girl group Girls Aloud.

Sarah Harding may also refer to:

- Sarah Harding (lama), Buddhist teacher and translator
- Sarah Harding (printer), Irish printer and publisher
- Sarah Harding (legal scholar), dean of the Schulich School of Law
- Dr. Sarah Harding, a character from the novel and film The Lost World: Jurassic Park
- Sarah Harding, a character from the British television series To Play the King, see List of House of Cards trilogy characters

== See also ==
- Sarah H. Harding House, a historical building in Andover, Massachusetts
- Sarah Ann Lillie Hardinge (1824–1913), American painter
