= Hardinge =

Hardinge is a surname. Notable people with the surname include:

- Viscount Hardinge, UK peerage, including:
  - Henry Hardinge, 1st Viscount Hardinge (1785–1856), British Army field marshal, Governor-General of India
  - Charles Hardinge, 2nd Viscount Hardinge (1822–1894), British politician
- Baron Hardinge of Penshurst, UK peerage, including:
  - Charles Hardinge, 1st Baron Hardinge of Penshurst (1858–1944), British diplomat and statesman, Viceroy of India
  - Alexander Hardinge, 2nd Baron Hardinge of Penshurst (1894–1960), British Army officer and courtier
- Sir Arthur Edward Hardinge (1828–1892), British Army general, Governor of Gibraltar
- Sir Arthur Henry Hardinge (1859–1933), British diplomat
- Frances Hardinge (born 1973), British author
- George Hardinge (1743–1816), English judge and Member of Parliament
- George Nicholas Hardinge (1781–1808), Royal Navy officer
- Nicholas Hardinge (1699–1758), English civil servant, Member of Parliament, known also as a neo-Latin poet
- Richard Hardinge (c.1593–1658), English parliamentarian and courtier
- Sarah Ann Lillie Hardinge (1824-1913), Texas artist
- Wally Hardinge (1886–1965), English cricketer
- William Money Hardinge (1854–1916), English poet and author

== See also ==
- Harding (surname)
