= Hardinge (disambiguation) =

Hardinge is a surname.

Hardinge may also refer to:

- Hardinge County, New South Wales, Australia
- Hardinge, Inc., American machine tool manufacturer

== See also ==
- Harding (disambiguation)
