= James Hardin =

James Hardin may refer to:

- James Hardin, co-founder of Camden House Publishing
- Jim Hardin (1943–1991), American baseball player
- James N. Hardin Jr. (1939–2026), American Germanist
- James Timothy Hardin or Tim Hardin (1941–1980), American musician

== See also ==
- James Harden (born 1989), American basketball player
- James Harden (disambiguation)
- James Harding (disambiguation)
