= Justine Shapiro =

American actress and film director

- Born: March 20, 1963 (age 62); South Africa
- Occupations: Actress, TV travel host, documentary filmmaker, director, producer, writer
- Years active: 1992–present
- Notable credit: Globe Trekker
- Website: Justine Shapiro profile

Justine Shapiro (born March 20, 1963) is a South African-born American actress, filmmaker, writer, hostess and producer, who was one of several main hosts of the Pilot Productions travel/adventure series Globe Trekker (also called Pilot Guides in Canada and originally broadcast as Lonely Planet).

== Television and film career ==
Before hosting Globe Trekker (Pilot Guides), Shapiro appeared in various roles in film and television. Eventually, she was involved in several documentaries including co-production/direction duties on 2001's Promises, which won two 2002 Emmy Awards, for Best Documentary and Outstanding Background Analysis, and was nominated for best Documentary Feature at the 74th Academy Awards. Promises attempts to humanize the Arab–Israeli conflict by examining it in microcosm, through the eyes of seven Palestinian and Israeli children living in or near the divided city of Jerusalem.

She produced and directed a feature-length documentary entitled Our Summer in Tehran.

In 2013 she became host of Time Team America, shown on PBS.

In 2021, Shapiro's company Matlana Media secured the rights to the Globe Trekker show archive. In 2024, she launched a reboot of the show titled Globe Trekker Now with fellow original hosts Ian Wright, Saami Sabiti, and Megan McCormick as well as other original crew members.

== Personal life ==
Shapiro was born in South Africa and grew up in Berkeley, California. She is Jewish.

Shapiro is a survivor of the World Airways Flight 30H airplane crash at Boston's Logan Airport on January 23, 1982.

During an October 2006 broadcast of the Globe Trekker Venice City Guide episode, Shapiro revealed that she went to Tufts University (majoring in history and theater) with Oliver Platt, who recognized her in the crowd while she was covering the Venice Film Festival, where Platt was promoting Casanova.

In her lead-up to a Globe Trekker visit to the Auschwitz concentration camp she stated "Like many Jewish Americans, I have Polish roots. And the Auschwitz concentration camp was where many of my relatives died during World War II."

In Globe Trekker's "South Africa 2", Shapiro and co-host Sami Sabiti traveled to South Africa. While in Soweto, Shapiro visited the nanny she had as a child.

Shapiro has an adult son and lives in San Francisco Bay Area.
