= Cliff Almond =

Cliff Almond may refer to:

- Cliff Almond (musician), American drummer and percussion player
- Cliff Almond (soccer) (1930–2018), Australian soccer player
