= James Harden (disambiguation) =

James Harden (born 1989) is an American basketball player.

James Harden may also refer to:

- Jim Harden (soccer) (fl. 1936), Australian soccer playerl see List of Australia men's international soccer players (2–3 caps)
- Richard Harden (politician) (James Richard Edwards Harden, 1916–2000), Northern Irish politician
- James Harden, one of the Dixmoor 5, American teenager wrongly convicted of rape and murder in Illinois, United States, in 1991
- Rich Harden (James Richard Harden, born 1981), Canadian baseball player
- Sheriff Jim Harden, fictional character in the 1950 western film The Bandit Queen

== See also ==
- James Harden-Hickey (1854–1898), Franco-American author
- James Harden Daugherty, African-American soldier in World War II
- James H. Hays (James Harden Hays, 1800–1876), American coal mine owner
- James Hardin (disambiguation)
- James Hard (1843–1953), American Civil War Union Army soldier
