= Adela Úcar =

Spanish journalist, host and producer (born 1980)

- Born: Adela Úcar Innerarity; March 16, 1980 (age 45); Bilbao, Spain
- Occupation: Journalist

Adela Úcar Innerarity (Bilbao, 1980) is a Spanish journalist, host and producer.

She studied Audiovisual Communication at the University of Navarre with a postgraduate course in Documentary Direction at the University of Melbourne (Australia), and she started working for Discovery Networks Asia in Singapore in 2004, after winning the international competition Discovery Channel "Reel Race" in 2003.

== Television ==
- Lonely Planet (Discovery Channel <UK version only>, 2007)
- Españoles en el mundo (TVE 1)
- Mucho Viaje (La 2)
- 21 días (Cuatro, 2009–2011)
- Globe Trekker (PBS, 2012) <also known as Pilot Guides)
