= Sigismund Koelle =

German missionary and scholar of languages of Africa

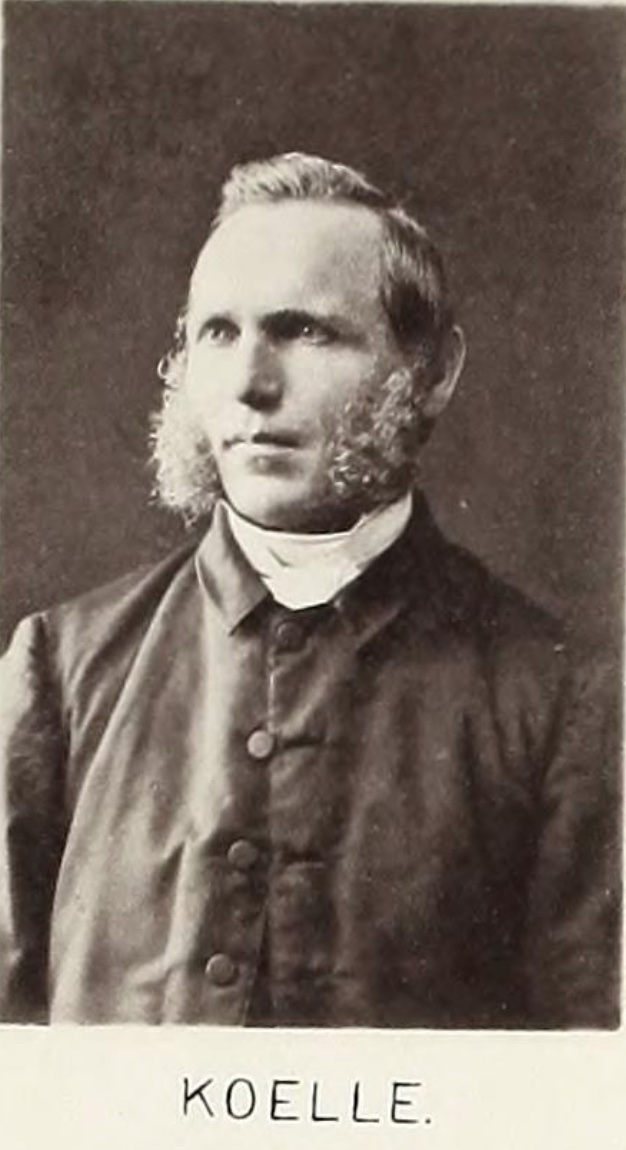
Photograph of Sigismund Wilhelm Koelle, from Robert Needham Cust ‘A sketch of the modern languages of Africa’ (1883)

Sigismund Wilhelm Koelle or Kölle (July 14, 1820 – February 18, 1902) was a German missionary working on behalf of the London-based Church Missionary Society, at first in Sierra Leone, where he became a pioneer scholar of the languages of Africa, and later in Constantinople (Istanbul). He published a major study in 1854, Polyglotta Africana, marking the beginning of serious study by Europeans of African languages.

== Life ==
Sigismund Koelle was born in Cleebronn in the Württemberg region of southern Germany. In his Württemberg origin he resembles his contemporaries Johann Ludwig Krapf (born 1810) and Johannes Rebmann (born 1820), who also worked as linguists and missionaries for the Church Missionary Society, but in East Africa. Another CMS missionary born in Württemberg was Karl Gottlieb Pfander (born 1803), who was Koelle's colleague in Constantinople.

After training in the Basel Mission, a missionary seminary in Basel, Switzerland, Koelle transferred in 1845 to the Church Missionary Society based in London; after further training in Islington he was ordained by the Bishop of London, Charles Blomfield. From December 1847 to February 1853 he lived and worked in Sierra Leone, the British protectorate established in West Africa for liberated slaves.

Koelle taught at Fourah Bay College, which was founded by the Church Missionary Society in 1827. "He was a Semitic scholar, and started a Hebrew class at Fourah Bay; and very soon African youths, the children of liberated slaves, could be seen reading the Old Testament in the original." While in Sierra Leone he also collected linguistic material from many African languages, some of it from freed slaves such as Ali Eisami, a Kanuri man. Koelle's major work, Polyglotta Africana (1854), is considered the beginning of the serious study of a large range of African languages by European scholars.

== Grammar of the Vai language ==
In 1849, when Koelle had been in Freetown for just over a year, he was asked to investigate a report that speakers of the Vy, Vei, or Vai language were using a script of their own invention. Koelle made a 7-week trip to Vailand to meet the inventor of the script, and wrote an account of his journey which was published later that same year. In mid 1850, Koelle spent a few weeks in the Gallinas district of Vailand, and from November 1850 to March 1851 he worked again in the Cape Mount district. By July 1851 he had completed his Vai grammar, and it was published by the Church Missionary Society in 1854.

== Polyglotta Africana ==
The second great linguistic work carried out by Koelle during his five years in Sierra Leone was the Polyglotta Africana. The idea of this was to use the fact that Sierra Leone was a melting pot of ex-slaves from all over Africa to compile a list of 280 basic words (a sort of early Swadesh list) in some 160 languages and dialects. These were then grouped as far as possible in families. Most of the informants who contributed to this work came from West Africa, but there were also others from as far away as Mozambique. One area that was lacking was the Swahili coast of Kenya and Tanzania, since it seems that slaves from this region were generally taken northwards to Zanzibar and Arabia rather than southward towards America and Brazil. The pronunciations of all the words were carefully noted using an alphabet similar, though not identical, to that devised by Karl Richard Lepsius, which was not yet available at that time. The name of the book was imitated from a well-known work called Asia Polyglotta (1823) by the German scholar Julius Klaproth.

In the introduction Koelle tells us that he wanted a selection of words that would be simple enough for each informant to be interviewed on a single day, and for this reason he omitted pronouns, which would have taken much longer to elicit. He adds that a few years earlier during a long vacation he had made a similar such list, of just 71 languages, and that in making the present list he had learnt from that experience. Included with a book is a map of Africa showing the approximate location, as far as it could be ascertained, of each language, prepared by the cartographer August Heinrich Petermann.

The value of the list is not merely linguistic, since the work not only includes the words themselves, arranged with all the languages spread out on two facing pages for each group of three English words, but Koelle also added a short biography of each informant, with geographical information about their place of origin, and an indication of how many other people they knew in Sierra Leone who spoke the same language. This information, combined with a census of Sierra Leone conducted in 1848, has proved invaluable to historians researching the African slave trade in the 19th century. Of the 210 informants, there were 179 ex-slaves (two of them women), while the rest were mostly traders or sailors. An analysis of the data shows that typically Koelle's informants were middle-aged or elderly men who had been living in Freetown for ten years or more. Three-quarters of the ex-slaves had left their homeland more than ten years earlier, and half of them more than 20 years before; and three-quarters of the informants were over 40 years old. Another interesting facet of the book is the manner in which the informants had been made slaves. Some had been captured in war, some kidnapped, some sold by a relative, others condemned for a debt or sentenced for a crime.

== Grammar of the Kanuri language ==
Another work researched and written by Koelle in Sierra Leone was the Grammar of the Bornu or Kanuri Language, also published in 1854. Koelle was engaged on this at intervals from 1848 to 1853, working for several hours a day with an informant called Ali Eisami Gazirma (also known as William Harding). Eisami also provided the material for another work, African Native Literature, which consists of proverbs, fables, descriptive accounts, and historical fragments in the Kanuri language.

Of Koelle's grammar, a later researcher, A. Von Duisburg, wrote:

"Koelle's Grammar is compiled with very great industry, but it unfortunately contains numerous errors, which may be explained by the fact that Koelle was never in Bornu or any racially allied country. His chief informant was an interpreter resident in Sierra Leone, who had left his mother-country more than forty years before Koelle made use of him in his linguistic studies. An examination of the above-mentioned Grammar warrants the assumption that Koelle himself never spoke Kanuri. He himself admits in the Preface to his Grammar that his interpreter did not seem to be reliable as regards the pronunciation of consonants, a fact which is frequently noticeable in the Grammar."

However, the translator P. A. Benton adds in a footnote: "I cannot agree. Koelle seems to me to be extraordinarily accurate."

== Later career ==
After 1853, Koelle, who had become ill by the end of his stay in Sierra Leone, never returned to West Africa. For a time he continued his linguistic researches, in particular on questions of standard orthography, in connection with the Standard Alphabet which was being discussed in 1854 by Karl Lepsius. In 1855 he was sent to Egypt, but remained only a short time; he moved on to Haifa in Palestine in the same year. In 1856 he was awarded the Volney Prize of 1,200 francs by the French Academy of Sciences for his work on the Polyglotta Africana.

In 1859 he was posted by the Church Missionary Society to Constantinople (Istanbul) to join Karl Gottlieb Pfander, who had gone out the year before. Together with another missionary, R. H. Weakley, he had some success in converting Turks to Christianity. However, in 1864, there was a violent reaction from the Turkish government and several Turkish converts were arrested. Pfander and Weakley were forced to leave Constantinople, while Koelle remained behind for a few more years. When the Church Missionary Society withdrew from the city in 1877, he stayed on there for a time as an independent missionary, until in 1879 he too was forced to depart, after being arrested, together with a Turkish friend, Ahmed Tewfik, who had helped him translate the Anglican prayer book into Turkish. Koelle was released after a few hours, but Tewfik was imprisoned and sentenced to death. After pressure from the British Government, Tewfik was sent into exile on the island of Chios, and eventually escaped to England, where he was baptized in 1881 into the Anglican church in a ceremony in St Paul's, Onslow Square London, witnessed among others by Koelle's father-in-law, Archdeacon Philpot. However, it seems that he was unhappy with his new life and after being sent to Egypt in 1883 he eventually voluntarily gave himself up again to his captors in Chios.

Sigismund Koelle died in London in 1902.

== Family ==
After returning from Africa, Koelle married Charlotte Elizabeth Philpot (1826–1919), the daughter of an English archdeacon. They had seven children. One of them, Constantine Philpot Koelle, born in Constantinople in 1862, later became a Church of England clergyman. One of Constantine's sons, Sir Harry Philpot Koelle (1901–1980), was to become a vice-admiral in the British Navy. His descendants pronounce the name as "Kelly".

== Works by Sigismund Koelle ==
- Koelle, S. W. (1849). Narrative of an expedition into the Vy country of West Africa and the discovery of a system of syllabic writing recently invented by the natives of the Vy tribe. London: Seeleys, Fleet Street; Hatchards, Picadilly; J. Nisbet and Co. Berners Street.
- Koelle, S. W. (1854). Outline of a Grammar of the Vei Language, Together with a Vei-English Vocabulary, and an Account of the Discovery and Nature of the Vei Mode of Syllabic Writing. London: Church Missionary House.
- Koelle, S. W. (1854). Grammar of the Bornu Or Kanuri Language (Google books)
- Koelle, S. W. (1854). African native literature, or Proverbs, tales, fables, & historical fragments in the Kanuri or Bornu language. To which are added a translation of the above and a Kanuri-English vocabulary.
- Koelle, S. W. (1854). Polyglotta Africana, or a comparative vocabulary of nearly three hundred words and phrases, in more than one hundred distinct African languages. London, Church Missionary House. (Click on the spanner icon to download.)
- Koelle, S. W. (1865). Food for Reflection: Being an Historical Comparison Between Mohammedanism and Christianity. London. (Published under the pseudonym Abd Isa.)
- Koelle, S. W. (1883). The Book of Common Prayer, Translated into Turkish. London: SPCK.
- Koelle, S. W. (1885). The death of Christ upon the cross. A fact, not a fiction: being a word in defence of Christianity against Mohammedan attacks. (Published under the name Abd Isa.)
- Koelle, S. W. (1889). Mohammed and Mohammedanism, Critically Considered. London: Rivingtons.
- Koelle, S. W. (1890). "Is Mohammed as Innocent of Imposture as Jesus Christ?" in Church Missionary Intelligencer and Record, 15, 162–65.
- Koelle, S. W. (1896). The Apocatastasis, or Restitution of All Things. London.
- Koelle, S. W. (1905) The Goal of the Universe or the Travail of the World's Saviour. (Reviewed in The Journal of Theological Studies, Vol. 8, No. 31 (April, 1907), pp. 471–472.)

== Bibliography ==
- Anderson, Richard; Lovejoy, Henry B. (2020). Liberated Africans and the Abolition of the Slave Trade, 1807-1896. University of Rochester Press.
- Curtin, Philip D.; Vansina, Jan (1964). "Sources of the Nineteenth Century Atlantic Slave Trade" The Journal of African History, Vol. 5, No. 2 (1964), pp. 185–208.
- Dalby, D. (1964). "Provisional identification of languages in the Polyglotta Africana", Sierra Leone Language Review (1964), 3, 83–90.
- Guthrie, Malcolm (1964). "Bantu Languages in the Polyglotta Africana". Sierra Leone Language Review 3, 59–64.
- Hair, P. E. H. (1963), "Koelle at Freetown: An Historical Introduction”, in Koelle, (1963 [1854a]), Polyglotta Africana, ed. P. E. H. Hair. Graz, pp. 7–17.
- Hair, P. E. H. (1965) "The Enslavement of Koelle's Informants". The Journal of African History, Vol. 6, No. 2 (1965), pp. 193–203.
- Houis, Maurice (1966). "Review: (Untitled). Reviewed Work: Polyglotta Africana by Sigismund Wilhelm Koelle." L'Homme. T. 6, No. 1 (Jan. - Mar., 1966), pp. 136–139. (in French)
- Johnston, Harry H. (1917). "The Bantu and the Semi-Bantu Languages" Journal of the Royal African Society, Jan., 1917, Vol. 16, No. 62, pp. 97-110.
- Lohmann, Hartmut (1992). "Sigismund Koelle". In Bautz, Traugott (ed.). Biographisch-Bibliographisches Kirchenlexikon (BBKL) (in German). Vol. 4. Herzberg: Bautz. cols. 259–261. ISBN 3-88309-038-7.
- Lapsansky-Werner, Emma J.; Bacon, Margaret Hope (eds) (2005). Back to Africa: Benjamin Coates and the Colonization Movement in America, 1848–1880. Pennsylvania State University.
- Pugach, Sara (2006). "Koelle, Sigismund Wilhelm (1823–1902)".
- Solleveld, Floris (2020). "Language Gathering and Philological Expertise: Sigismund Koelle, Wilhelm Bleek, and the Languages of Africa". Les Linguistes allemands du XIXème siècle et leurs interlocuteurs étrangers. pp. 169–200.
- Stock, Eugene (1899). History of the Church Missionary Society Vol 2. London.
- Stock, Eugene (1899). History of the Church Missionary Society Vol 3. London.
- Stammerjohann, Harro (ed.) (2009). Lexicon Grammaticorum: A bio-bibliographical companion to the history of Linguistics. Tübingen; 2nd edition, p. 823.
- Vander Werff, Lyle L. (1977). Christian Mission to Muslims: The Record. William Carey Library.
