= Sir Bourchier Wrey, 6th Baronet =

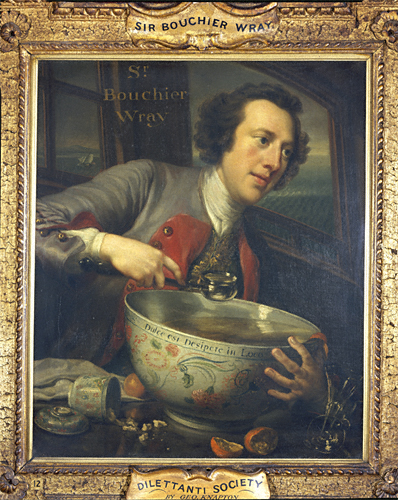
Bourchier Wrey, depicted on a ship at sea serving from a punch bowl, the rim of which is inscribed from Horace, IV Odes, xii, closing line: Dulce est Desipere in Loco ("It is sweet at fitting time to act foolishly"). 1744 portrait by George Knapton (1698–1778) for the Society of Dilettanti.

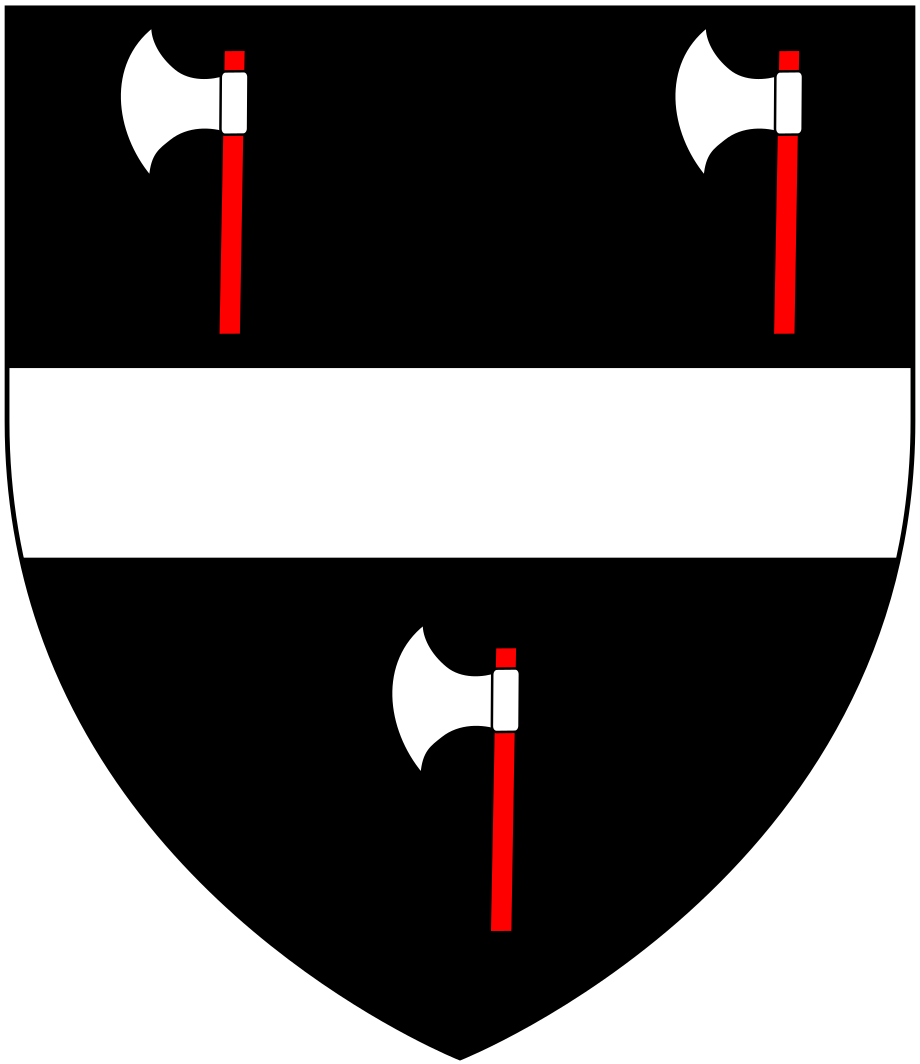
Arms of Wrey of Trebeigh, Cornwall and Tawstock, Devon: Sable, a fesse between three pole-axes argent helved gules

Sir Bourchier Wrey, 6th Baronet (c. 1715 – 13 April 1784) of Tawstock, Devon, was a Member of Parliament for Barnstaple, Devon, in 1747–1754. The manor of Tawstock, about two miles south of Barnstaple, had been since the time of Henry de Tracy (died 1274) the residence of the feudal barons of Barnstaple, ancestors of the Wrey family.

== Origins ==
He was the eldest son and heir of Sir Bourchier Wrey, 5th Baronet (c. 1683 – 1726), lord of the manor of Tawstock, a Jacobite sympathiser, by his wife (who had married him as her second husband) and first cousin Diana Rolle (born 1683), a daughter of John Rolle (died 1689), eldest son and heir of Sir John Rolle (1626–1706) of Stevenstone, near Great Torrington, Devon, Sheriff of Devon in 1682 and one of the largest landowners in Devon.

== Career ==
He was educated at Winchester College and New College, Oxford and succeeded his father as 6th baronet on 12 November 1726.

He made his Grand Tour in 1737–40 during which he visited Paris, Geneva, Rome, Florence and Milan. While living in Rome, Lady Mary Wortley Montagu recorded him as having slept with his landlady, with the encouragement of his landlord. In 1742 he was elected to the Society of Dilettanti, a group of gentlemen who wanted to maintain an interest in the antiquarian and artistic pursuits which they had enjoyed abroad. George Knapton (1698–1778), the official portraitist of the society, painted his portrait in 1744, in which he is depicted on board a ship holding a punch bowl inscribed with a line from Horace's Odes: "dulce est desipere in loco" (it is sweet on occasion to play the fool).

He was elected Member of Parliament for Barnstaple in 1748 and supported the Whigs. In this seat he replaced his first cousin Henry Rolle, 1st Baron Rolle (1708–1750) who had been elevated to the House of Lords in 1748. In 1752 he went to Bremen, Hamburg and Lübeck as a delegate for the 'Society for Carrying on the Herring Fishery'. He rebuilt the pier at Ilfracombe, of which manor he was lord, and established better arrangements for English fishermen in Bremen, Hamburg, Lübeck and Copenhagen.

== Marriages and children ==
Wrey married twice:

- Firstly in 1749 to Mary Edwards (d.1751), a daughter of John Edwards of Highgate. She died childless in 1751 and was the subject of a long Latin epitaph in The Gentleman's Magazine of that year.
- Secondly in 1755 he married Ellen Thresher (1733–1813), a daughter and co-heiress of John Thresher of Bradford on Avon, Wiltshire. She died at her house in The Circus, Bath, Somerset, on 3 December 1813. His children by Ellen were two sons and four daughters:
  - Sir Bourchier Wrey, 7th Baronet (1757–1826), eldest son and heir.
  - Rev. Bourchier William Wrey (1761–1839), Rector of Tawstock 1801–1839, who re-built as his residence Corffe House within the parish. In 1789 he married Sophia Bethell, daughter of George Bethell. His mural monument survives in Tawstock Church inscribed as follows:

"In memory of the Revd BOURCHIER WILLIAM WREY, M.A. Son of Sir BOURCHIER WREY, Bar; and 38 Years Rector of this Parish, who departed this Life, and entered into his Eternal Rest August 19th, 1839, Aged 78 Years. Here Affection lingers to recal his noble mien, his gentle dignified address, his amiability, benevolence, and worth, and Piety, with humble thankfulness records, the heavenborn comfort of his latter years, wherein the Name of Jesus proved, his Wisdom, Righteousness and Strength, his Joy in sorrow, his Life in death. Also in memory of SOPHIA Wife of the above Br Wm WREY who departed this Life Decr 1st 1848; Aged 81 Years. Blessed are the Dead which Die in the Lord."

Below is a brass plaque inscribed: The Reverend Bourchier William Wrey, M.A Rector of Tawstock, Natus 6th May, 1761. Obiit 19th August, 1839.

  - Ellen Wrey.
  - Dyonisia Wrey, wife of Robert Harding and mother of the Devon historian Lt-Col. William Harding (1792–1886) of Upcott in the parish of Pilton in North Devon, about 3 miles north of Tawstock.
  - Florentina Wrey, who married Richard Godolphin Long.
  - Anna Maria Wrey

== Death and burial ==
Sir Bourchier Wrey died 13 April 1784 and was interred in Tawstock church where survives his monument. He was succeeded by his eldest son Sir Bourchier Wrey, 7th Baronet (1757–1826).

== Monument at Tawstock ==
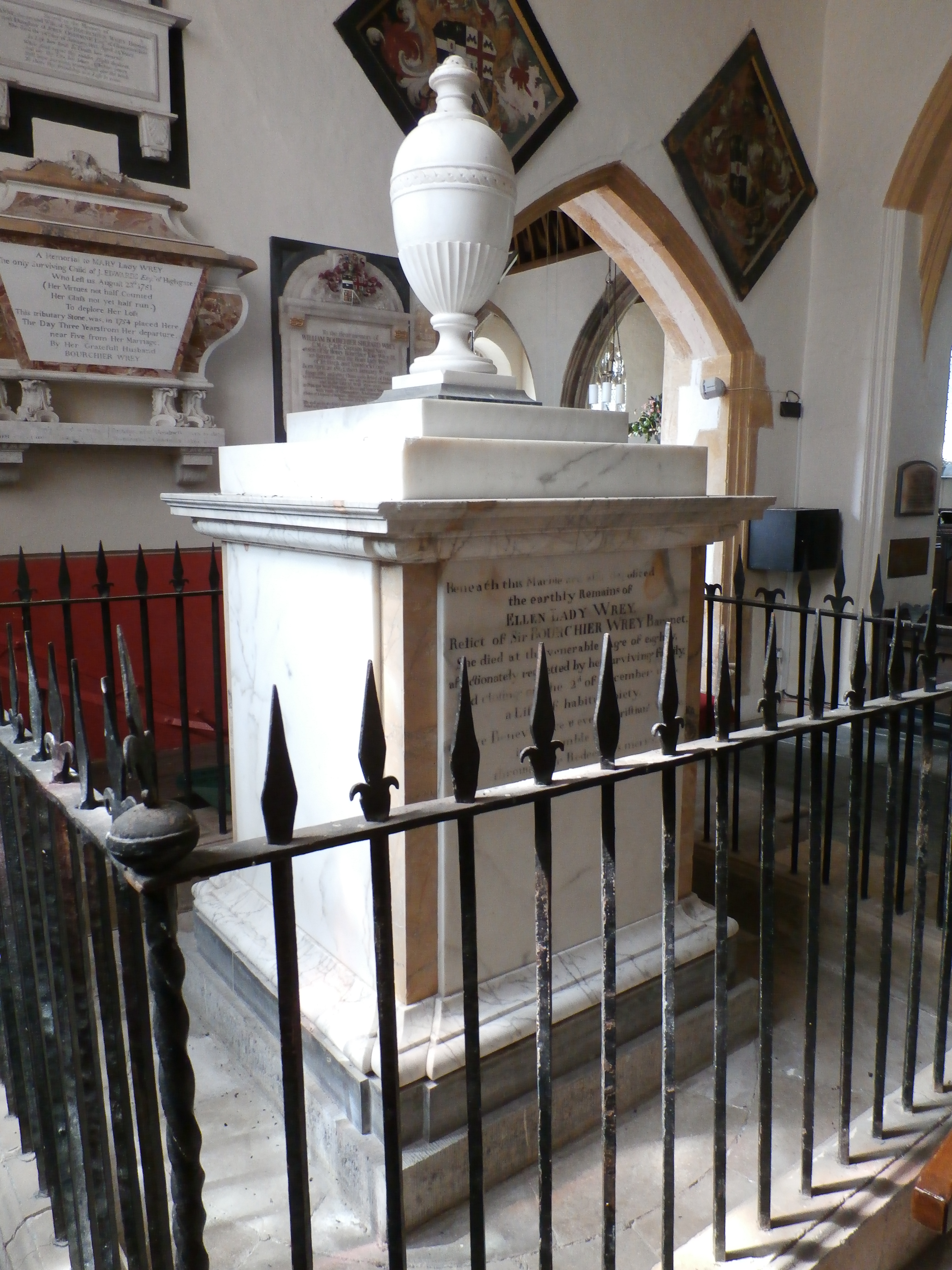
1784 monument to Sir Bourchier Wrey, 6th Baronet (c. 1715–1784), south transept, Tawstock Church. Viewed from south-east

A monument to Sir Bourchier Wrey, 6th Baronet (c. 1715–1784), described by Pevsner as "stately", exists in the south transept of Tawstock Church, being a plain free-standing urn on a big square pedestal, railed off by iron railings. The north side of the base is inscribed as follows:

"Sacred To the Memory of Sir Bourchier Wrey of Tawstock House In the County of Devon Bart Descended from Sir Chichester Wrey Bart Of Trebeigh in the County of Cornwall By Ann wife Wife Daughter and Coheiress Of Edward Bourchier Earl of Bath And Lord Fitz-warine, and relict of James Earl of Middlesex. He was chosen in 1748 to represent in Parliament the Borough of Barnstaple And was nineteen Years Colonel of the North Devon Regiment of Militia He departed this Life April 13th 1784 Aged 69 Years Sir Bourchier Wrey was twice married First to Mary daughter of John Edwards of Highgate Esqr By which Marriage there was no issue, Afterwards to Ellen Daughter & Coheiress of John Thresher Esqr of Bradford in the County of Wilts (By Whom he has left two Sons and four Daughters Bourchier, Bourchier William, Ellen, Dyonisia, Florentina, and Anna Maria) & who having surviv's him has caus'd This Monument to be erected As a Testimony of Her Respect and Affection".

The east side is inscribed:

"Beneath this Marble are also deposited the earthly Remains of Ellen Lady Wrey, Relict of Sir Bourchier Wrey Baronet, She died at the venerable Age of eighty, affectionately regretted by her surviving family, and closing on the 2d of December 1813, a Life of habitual piety, active Benevolence & every Christian Virtue, in the humble hope, through her Redeemers merits. Immortality".

== See also ==
- Wrey baronets

== Sources ==
- Leigh Rayment's list of baronets
- Vivian, Lt.Col. J.L., The Visitations of Cornwall: Comprising the Heralds' Visitations of 1530, 1573 & 1620; with Additions by J.L. Vivian, Exeter, 1887, pp.564-566, pedigree of "Wrey of Trebeigh"

Parliament of Great Britain
Preceded by Henry Rolle; Thomas Benson	Member of Parliament for Barnstaple; 1748–1754; With: Thomas Benson	Succeeded by John Harris; George Amyand
Baronetage of England
Preceded by Bourchier Wrey	Baronet (of Trebitch); 1726–1784	Succeeded by Bourchier Wrey
