= Roy McNaughton =

Australian soccer player

Personal information
- Place of birth: Cessnock, Australia
- Position: Forward

Youth career
- Cessnock

Senior career*
| Years | Team | Apps | (Gls) |
| ?–1927 | Cessnock | | |
| 1928–1929 | Kurri Kurri | | |
| 1929–? | Weston | | |

International career
| 1924 | Australia | 2 | (0) |
- * Club domestic league appearances and goals

Roy McNaughton was an Australian soccer player who played as forward for the Australia national team. He played most of his senior career with Cessnock and switched a variety of Newcastle based clubs including Kurri Kurri, Weston and Aberdare afterwards.

== International career ==
McNaughton played for Australia twice; his debut in a 4–1 against Canada on 23 June 1924 and his final match in a 0–0 draw also against Canada on 28 June 1924.

== Honours ==
Cessnock

- Northern NSW Premiership: 1925, 1926, 1927

== Career statistics ==
=== International ===
| Team | Year | Competitive | | Friendly | | Total | |
| Team | Year | Apps | Goals | Apps | Goals | Apps | Goals |
|---|---|---|---|---|---|---|---|
| Australia | 1924 | 0 | 0 | 2 | 0 | 2 | 0 |
