= Henry Harding =

Henry Harding may refer to:

- Henry Harding (actor), Ghanaian film actor
- Henry Harding (chess player) in American Chess Congress
- Henry Harding, character in Preaching to the Perverted (film)

== See also ==
- Henry Hardinge, politician
- Harry Harding (disambiguation)
