= Paul Hardin =

Paul Hardin may refer to:

- Paul Hardin Jr. (1903–1996), American Methodist bishop
- Paul Hardin (chronobiologist) (born 1960), American scientist in the field of chronobiology
- Paul Hardin III (1931–2017), American academic administrator

== See also ==
- Paul Harding (disambiguation)
