= Globe Trekker =

English television series

- Also known as: Pilot Guides
- Genre: Adventure travel
- Starring: Various hosts (known as Travellers)
- Country of origin: England
- Original language: English
- No. of seasons: 17
- No. of episodes: 218+

Production
- Running time: 60 minutes

Original release
- Network: Channel 4 PBS; OLN Canada; Travel Channel; Travel Channel (international); Discovery Travel & Living (Aus); NYC Media; Arutz HaTiyulim (yes (Israel), HOT (Israel)); Yle TV2; DR2; NRK2
- Release: 1994 – 2016

Globe Trekker (sometimes called Pilot Guides in Australia, Spain and Thailand, and originally broadcast as Lonely Planet) is a British adventure tourism television series produced by Pilot Productions. The British series was inspired by the Lonely Planet travelbooks and began airing in 1994. Globe Trekker is broadcast in over 40 countries across six continents. The programme won over 20 international awards, including six American Cable Ace awards.

== Program synopsis ==
Each episode features a host, called a traveller, who travels with a camera crew to a country/major city and experiences the sights, sounds, and culture that the location has to offer. Special episodes feature in-depth looks at beaches, volcanoes, journeys, history, festivals, endangered places and food guides. DVDs of special interest also feature culture, nature and around the world collections.

The show often goes far beyond popular tourist destinations in order to give viewers a more authentic look at local culture. Presenters usually participate in different aspects of regional life, such as attending a traditional wedding or visiting a mining community. They address the viewer directly, acting as tourists-turned-tour guides, but are also filmed interacting with locals and discovering interesting locations in (mostly) unrehearsed sequences. Globe Trekker also sometimes includes brief interviews with backpackers who share tips on independent travel in that particular country or city.

== Production details ==
It usually takes 12 to 15 weeks to complete an episode of the show from start to finish, including at least four weeks of research, three weeks of planning and preparation (speaking to tourist boards, making travel arrangements), two to three weeks of actual filming, and three weeks of editing and post-production.

The traveller is often accompanied by five or six members of camera and production crew, who almost never appear on camera. Specifically, the crew consists of a camera operator and a sound technician, plus a producer and a director, who scout locations two weeks before filming. A driver, pilot, or other type of facilitator is often hired locally. A traveller and crew almost never spend more than three nights in one particular area.

== Theme music ==
The series is known for its distinctive theme and background music, which consists largely of instrumental downtempo electronic dance compositions containing global folk music elements. Most of the music is written for the show by Ian Ritchie, Michael Conn, Colin Winston-Fletcher, with additional music from Makoto Sakamoto, Nainita Desai & Malcolm Laws, Nomad, Jesper Mattsson, The Insects, The West India Company, Stephen Luscombe, and Pandit Dinesh. Several collection of tracks from the show have been released as albums, including Globe Trekker: Ambient Journeys, Globe Trekker: Earth Journeys (volumes 1 and 2), Globe Trekker: Music From The TV Series (volumes 1 and 2), Globe Trekker: Asian Journeys, Globe Trekker: Latin American Journeys, and Globe Trekker: World Jam.

== Presenters ==
Pilot Productions employs several presenters for its variety of programs which include Planet Food, Bazaar, World Cafe, and Treks in a Wild World. This list of presenters is limited to those appearing in Globe Trekker.

- Jonathan Atherton
- Danielle Baker
- Brianna Barnes
- Estelle Bingham
- Christina Chang
- Bobby Chinn
- KT Comer
- Bradley Cooper, who hosted a number of episodes in the early 2000s before achieving success as a Hollywood actor
- Mark Crowdy
- Zoe D’Amato
- Andrew Daddo
- Tyler Florence
- Neil Gibson
- Nikki Grosse
- Zay Harding
- Katy Haswell
- Judith Jones
- Padma Lakshmi, who would go on to host major productions such as Top Chef
- Megan McCormick
- Shilpa Mehta
- Holly Morris
- Eils Nevitt
- Zoe Palmer
- Merrilees Parker
- Alex Riley
- Sami Sabiti
- Justine Shapiro
- Lavinia Tan
- Adela Úcar
- Lucille Whitney
- Ian Wright
- Matt Young

== Reception ==
In 2020 The Washington Post listed the show, as hosted on the Vudu video streaming service, as one of the best adventure travel television shows.

== Episodes ==
During the course of the series, 248 episodes were produced.

=== Season 1 (1994) ===
#	Title	Presented by
1	"Indonesia: The Eastern Islands"	Mark Crowdy
2	"Pacific Islands: Fiji, Vanuatu & The Solomon Islands"	Ian Wright
3	"Africa: Zimbabwe, Botswana & Namibia"	Andrew Daddo
4	"Morocco"	Ian Wright
5	"South East Australia"	Ian Wright
6	"Ecuador & The Galapagos Islands"	Justine Shapiro
7	"Vietnam"	Justine Shapiro
8	"Japan: Tokyo to Taiwan"	Ian Wright
9	"La Ruta Maya"	Justine Shapiro
10	"Alaska"	Ian Wright
11	"North East Brazil"	Ian Wright
12	"North India: Varanasi to the Himalayas"	Andrew Daddo
13	"Jamaica"	Ian Wright

=== Season 2 (1995) ===
#	Title	Presented by
1	"Israel & The Sinai Desert"	Justine Shapiro
2	"East Africa: Tanzania & Zanzibar"	Ian Wright
3	"Central Asia"	Ian Wright
4	"The American Rockies"	Ian Wright
5	"South West China"	Justine Shapiro
6	"Chile & Easter Island"	Ian Wright
7	"South India"	Justine Shapiro
8	"Baja California"	Ian Wright
9	"West Africa: Benin, Burkina Faso & Mali"	Justine Shapiro
10	"Trekking in Uganda and Zaire"	Nikki Grosse
11	"Turkey"	Justine Shapiro
12	"Corsica, Sardinia & Sicily"	Ian Wright
13	"Iceland & Greenland"	Ian Wright

=== Season 3 (1996) ===
#	Title	Presented by
1	"New York City Guide"	Ian Wright
2	"Syria, Jordan & Lebanon"	Ian Wright
3	"Argentina"	Justine Shapiro
4	"Ethiopia"	Ian Wright
5	"South Africa & Lesotho"	Justine Shapiro
6	"Cuba & Haiti"	Ian Wright
7	"Philippines"	Shilpa Mehta
8	"Outback Australia"	Ian Wright
9	"Pakistan"	Neil Gibson
10	"Peru"	Neil Gibson
11	"Northern Spain"	Shilpa Mehta
12	"South West USA"	Justine Shapiro
13	"Hungary & Romania"	Ian Wright

=== Season 4 (1997) ===
#	Title	Presented by
1	"North Thailand & Laos"	Ian Wright
2	"Central America: Costa Rica & Nicaragua"	Neil Gibson
3	"Indonesia: Bali & Sulawesi"	Shilpa Mehta
4	"Iran"	Ian Wright
5	"Norway"	Ian Wright
6	"London City Guide"	Jonathan Atherton
7	"Mongolia"	Ian Wright
8	"Czech Republic & Southern Poland"	Justine Shapiro
9	"Papua New Guinea"	Jonathan Atherton
10	"Paris City Guide"	Justine Shapiro
11	"Nepal"	Ian Wright
12	"Southern Italy"	Justine Shapiro
13	"Amsterdam City Guide"	Jonathan Atherton

=== Season 5 (1998) ===
#	Title	Presented by
1	"Hawaii"	Megan McCormick
2	"Finland & The Baltic States"	Neil Gibson
3	"West India"	Megan McCormick
4	"San Francisco City Guide"	Justine Shapiro
5	"New Zealand"	Ian Wright
6	"Mexico City Guide"	Justine Shapiro
7	"Malaysia & Southern Thailand"	Justine Shapiro
8	"Rio de Janeiro City Guide"	Ian Wright
9	"Sydney City Guide"	Justine Shapiro
10	"Egypt"	Megan McCormick
11	"West Africa: Ghana & The Ivory Coast"	Megan McCormick
12	"Arctic Canada"	Ian Wright
13	"New Orleans City Guide"	Justine Shapiro

=== Season 6 (1999) ===
#	Title	Presented by
1	"Mainland Greece"	Christina Chang
2	"Ireland"	Ian Wright
3	"Deep South USA"	Ian Wright
4	"Sri Lanka & Maldive Islands"	Megan McCormick
5	"Bolivia"	Ian Wright
6	"Madagascar"	Ian Wright
7	"World Food: Vietnam"	Justine Shapiro
8	"Micronesia"	Megan McCormick
9	"Cambodia"	Ian Wright
10	"Eastern Caribbean"	Justine Shapiro
11	"Moscow, St Petersburg and Murmansk"	Ian Wright
12	"World History: England"	Justine Shapiro
13	"Southern Spain"	Christina Chang

=== Season 7 (2000) ===
#	Title	Presented by
1	"Queensland and The Great Barrier Reef"	Megan McCormick
2	"Georgia & Armenia"	Ian Wright
3	"Greek Islands"	Megan McCormick
4	"California"	Justine Shapiro
5	"Scotland"	Megan McCormick
6	"Germany"	Justine Shapiro
7	"Central China"	Megan McCormick
8	"Venezuela"	Ian Wright
9	"Northern Italy"	Megan McCormick
10	"Tunisia & Libya"	Ian Wright
11	"Tahiti & Samoa"	Ian Wright
12	"South West Australia"	Estelle Bingham
13	"Portugal and the Azores"	Megan McCormick

=== Season 8 (2001) ===
#	Title	Presented by
1	"Istanbul City Guide"	Estelle Bingham
2	"Beijing City Guide"	Megan McCormick
3	"South of France"	Christina Chang
4	"Java and Sumatra"	Megan McCormick
5	"Kenya"	Estelle Bingham
6	"Vienna City Guide"	Ian Wright
7	"New England, USA"	Megan McCormick
8	"Ultimate Indo China"	Multiple Travelers
9	"Rome City Guide"	Estelle Bingham
10	"South Korea"	Ian Wright
11	"Ultimate Australia"	Multiple Travelers
12	"Asian Cities: Calcutta, Shanghai & Bangkok"	Multiple Travelers
13	"Southern Mexico"	Ian Wright

=== Season 9 (2002) ===
#	Title	Presented by
1	"Arab Gulf States"	Megan McCormick
2	"Northern France"	Justine Shapiro
3	"Tuscany"	Ian Wright
4	"London 2"	Jonathan Atherton, Megan McCormick
5	"Morocco 2"	Ian Wright, Megan McCormick
6	"Washington DC City Guide"	Justine Shapiro
7	"Great Festivals 2"	Multiple Travelers
8	"Ultimate France"	Multiple Travelers
9	"Ultimate Italy"	Multiple Travelers
10	"Marrakech and Dubai City Guides"	Megan McCormick
11	"Hong Kong & Taiwan"	Megan McCormick
12	"World History Middle East"	Multiple Travelers
13	"New York 2"	Ian Wright, Megan McCormick

=== Season 10 (2003) ===
#	Title	Presented by
1	"Tokyo City Guide"	Ian Wright
2	"Mozambique"	Ian Wright
3	"Cameroon"	Zay Harding
4	"South East China"	Zay Harding
5	"Ultimate Caribbean"	Multiple Travelers
6	"South Africa 2"	Justine Shapiro, Sami Sabiti
7	"Belgium and Luxembourg"	Katy Haswell
8	"Ultimate Mexico"	Multiple Travelers
9	"Pacific North West USA"	Sami Sabiti
10	"Florida and the Bahamas"	Lavinia Tan
11	"Ultimate China"	Multiple Travelers
12	"Ultimate India"	Multiple Travelers
13	"Western Canada"	Zay Harding

=== Season 11 (2004) ===
#	Title	Presented by
1	"England and Wales"	Ian Wright
2	"Midwest USA"	Justine Shapiro
3	"Venice City Guide"	Justine Shapiro
4	"South East USA"	Megan McCormick
5	"Civil War Special"	Megan McCormick, Justine Shapiro
6	"Malaysia: Penang, Malacca & Borneo"	Ian Wright
7	"Indian Ocean Islands"	Ian Wright
8	"New Zealand 2"	Ian Wright, Zay Harding
9	"Chinatown Special"	Multiple Travelers
10	"Beirut City Guide"	Multiple Travelers
11	"Ultimate UK"	Multiple Travelers
12	"Great Festivals 3"	Multiple Travelers
13	"The Good and Bad Food Guide 2"	Multiple Travelers

=== Season 12 (2005) ===
#	Title	Presented by
1	"Sweden and Denmark"	Megan McCormick
2	"Spanish Islands"	Alex Riley
3	"Las Vegas City Guide"	Ian Wright
4	"Galleons, Pirates and Treasure Special"	Megan McCormick
5	"Colombia and Panama"	Megan McCormick
6	"Trekking the Turks and Caicos Islands and Walking the Milford Track"	Ian Wright, Zay Harding
7	"Ice Trekking the Alps"	Zay Harding
8	"Paris City Guide 2"	Adela Ucar, Justine Shapiro
9	"Cyprus and Crete"	KT Comer, Adela Ucar
10	"Great Journeys: Road Warriors"	Multiple Travelers
11	"Globe Shopper 2"	Multiple Travelers
12	"Great Journeys 2: Planes, Trains and Automobiles"	Multiple Travelers
13	"Eco Trekker Special: Great Natural Wonders"	Multiple Travelers

=== Season 13 (2006) ===
#	Title	Presented by
1	"Los Angeles"	Megan McCormick
2	"Zambia & Malawi"	Holly Morris
3	"Honduras & El Salvador"	Brianna Barnes
4	"Senegal & Cape Verde"	Zoe Palmer
5	"Utah & Colorado"	Holly Morris
6	"The Caribbean Islands"	Zoe Palmer
7	"World War II in Europe"	Multiple Travelers
8	"Germany 2"	Megan McCormick, Justine Shapiro
9	"Slovenia & Croatia"	Bradley Cooper
10	"Volcanoes: Rings of Fire"	Multiple Travelers
11	"Transatlantic Slave Trade"	Multiple Travelers
12	"Planet of the Apes Special"	Multiple Travelers
13	"Trekking the Pacific: The Cook Islands & Kokoda Trail in Papua New Guinea"	Zoe Palmer, Matt Young

=== Season 14 (2007) ===
#	Title	Presented by
1	"Holy Lands: Jerusalem & The West Bank"	Zay Harding
2	"Holy Lands 2: Israel"	Zay Harding
3	"Barcelona City Guide"	Megan McCormick
4	"Madrid City Guide"	Adela Úcar
5	"Turkey 2"	Adela Úcar
6	"Syria"	Holly Morris
7	"Antarctica"	Zay Harding
8	"The South Atlantic"	Zay Harding
9	"Nigeria"	Adela Úcar
10	"Ukraine"	Holly Morris
11	"The Netherlands"	Brianna Barnes
12	"Amsterdam 2"	Brianna Barnes
13	"Endangered Places"	Multiple Travelers

=== Season 15 (2008) ===
#	Title	Presented by
1	"Puerto Rico"	Zay Harding
2	"Papua New Guinea Islands"	Zay Harding
3	"Bangladesh"	Holly Morris
4	"Great Historic Sites: The Age of Empire"	Multiple Travelers
5	"Great Historic Sites: The Modern World"	Multiple Travelers
6	"World War II: The Pacific"	Multiple Travelers
7	"East Texas"	Zay Harding
8	"West Texas"	Zay Harding
9	"Mid-Atlantic States, USA"	Brianna Barnes
10	"Eastern Canada"	Zoe D’Amato
11	"Isolated Islands: Marshall Islands & Dutch Antilles"	Zay Harding
12	"London 3"	Brianna Barnes
13	"Uruguay & Paraguay"	Holly Morris

=== Season 16 (2009) ===
#	Title	Presented by
1	"Buenos Aires City Guide"	Judith Jones
2	"Colonial Australia"	Zay Harding
3	"Art Trails of the French Riviera"	Kate Comer
4	"Great Australian Hikes"	Zay Harding
5	"Myanmar"	Megan McCormick
6	"World War I: The Western Front"	Zay Harding
7	"Good and Bad Food (and Drink) Guide 3"	Multiple Travelers
8	"Northeast England"	Judith Jones
9	"Switzerland"	Brianna Barnes
10	"Building England 1:Before there were Architects"	Judith Jones
11	"Delhi and Rajasthan"	Holly Morris
12	"Central Japan"	Megan McCormick
13	"Mumbai City Guide"	Zay Harding

=== Round the World ===
#	Title	Presented by
1	"Across America: Route 66 & Beyond"	Justine Shapiro
2	"Pan Americana 1: Conquistadors, Aztecs & Revolutions"	Judith Jones
3	"Pan Americana 2: Conquistadors, Incas & Inquisitions"	Brianna Barnes
4	"Pacific Journeys 1: Santiago to Pitcairn"	Zay Harding
5	"Pacific Journeys 2: Tonga to New Caledonia"	Zay Harding
6	"The Silk Road 1: Xi’an to Kashgar"	Megan McCormick
7	"The Silk Road 2: Kashgar to Istanbul"	Holly Morris
8	"East to West: Istanbul to Vienna"	Ian Wright

=== Season 17 (2010) ===
#	Title	Presented by
1	"Building England 2: The Age of Architects"	Judith Jones
2	"Road Trip Ruta 40: Patagonia"	Zay Harding
3	"Road Trip Ruta 40: The Andes"	Zay Harding
4	"Top Ten South American Adventures"	Multiple Travelers
5	"Isolated Islands: Saint Helena"	Zay Harding
6	"Poland"	Megan McCormick
7	"Delhi and Agra"	Ian Wright
8	"Top Ten African Adventures"	
9	"Sacred Places Special: Great Mosques"	Multiple Travelers
10	"The Rise and Fall of The British Raj"	Zay Harding voice-over, involving multiple travellers (Ian Wright mostly, Bobby Chinn & Holly Morris)
11	"The Wild West, USA"	Multiple Travelers
12	"Hawaii 2"	Zoe D’Amato
13	"Rust Belt Highway, USA"	Megan McCormick
