= Meg Harding =

American politician

Meg Harding (born July 15, 1945) is a former American Democratic politician from Kansas City, Missouri, who served in the Missouri House of Representatives.

Born in Midland, Michigan, she graduated from the University of Michigan. She previously worked as a speech and hearing therapist in public schools of Arlington, Virginia, and in Darmstadt, Germany.
