= Ernie Owen =

Australian soccer player

William Owen
Personal information
- Full name: William Owen
- Place of birth: Wollongong, Australia
- Position: Right-half

Youth career
- Mazeppas

Senior career*
Years	Team	Apps	(Gls)
1919	Minmi		
1920–1928	Wallsend		

International career
1923–1924	Australia	3	(0)
- * Club domestic league appearances and goals

William "Ernie" Owen was a former Australian professional soccer player who last played as a full-back for Wallsend, Speers Point and the Australia national soccer team.

== Club career ==
After Owen progressed from his junior career at Mazeppas in 1919, he joined Wallsend from 1920 to 1928. He joined Speers Points in a brief stint in the year of 1928.

== International career ==
Owen began his international career with Australia in June 1923 on their second historic tour against New Zealand, debuting in a 1–4 loss to New Zealand. He played two more matches for Australia against Canada men's national soccer team resulting in a 4–1 win and a 0–0 draw.

== Career statistics ==
=== International ===
National team	Year	Competitive		Friendly		Total	
National team	Year	Apps	Goals	Apps	Goals	Apps	Goals
Australia	1923	0	0	1	0	1	0
Australia	1924	0	0	2	0	2	0
Career total		0	0	3	0	3	0
