= Chester Harding =

Chester Harding may refer to:

- Chester Harding (painter) (1792–1866), American artist
- Chester Harding Jr. (1827–1875), American lawyer and Civil War officer
- Chester Harding (governor) (1866–1936), Governor of Panama Canal Zone
- Chester Harding House, historic house in Massachusetts, U.S.A.
