= Peter Harding =

Peter Harding may refer to:

- Sir Peter Harding (RAF officer, born 1933) (1933–2021), former Royal Air Force Chief of the Air Staff, and Chief of Defence Staff
- Peter Harding (RAF officer, born 1940) (1940–2013), air vice-marshal
- Peter Harding (metallurgist) (1919–2006), RAF reconnaissance pilot, World War II prisoner of war and metallurgist at the Royal School of Mines
- Peter Harding (wheelchair rugby) (born 1969), Australian Paralympic wheelchair rugby union player
- Peter Harding (climber) (1924–2007), British rock climber
- Pete Harding, 2003 NASCAR Craftsman Truck Series
