= William Harding (antiquary) =

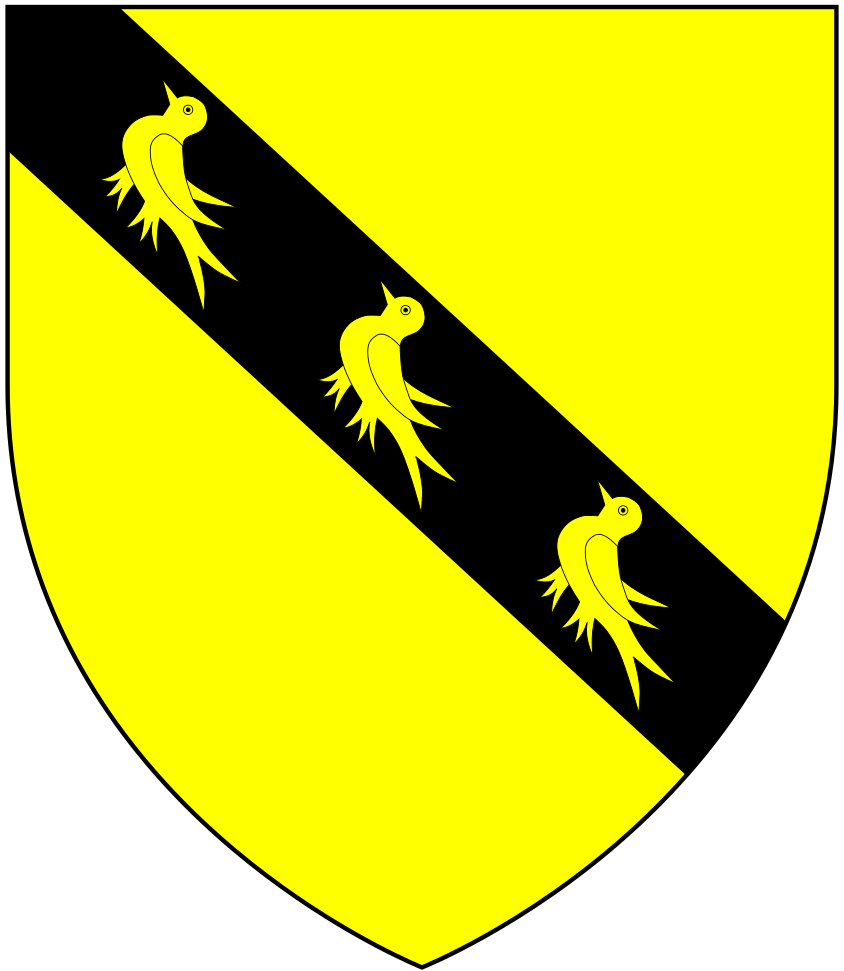
Arms of Harding: Or, on a bend sable three martlets of the field

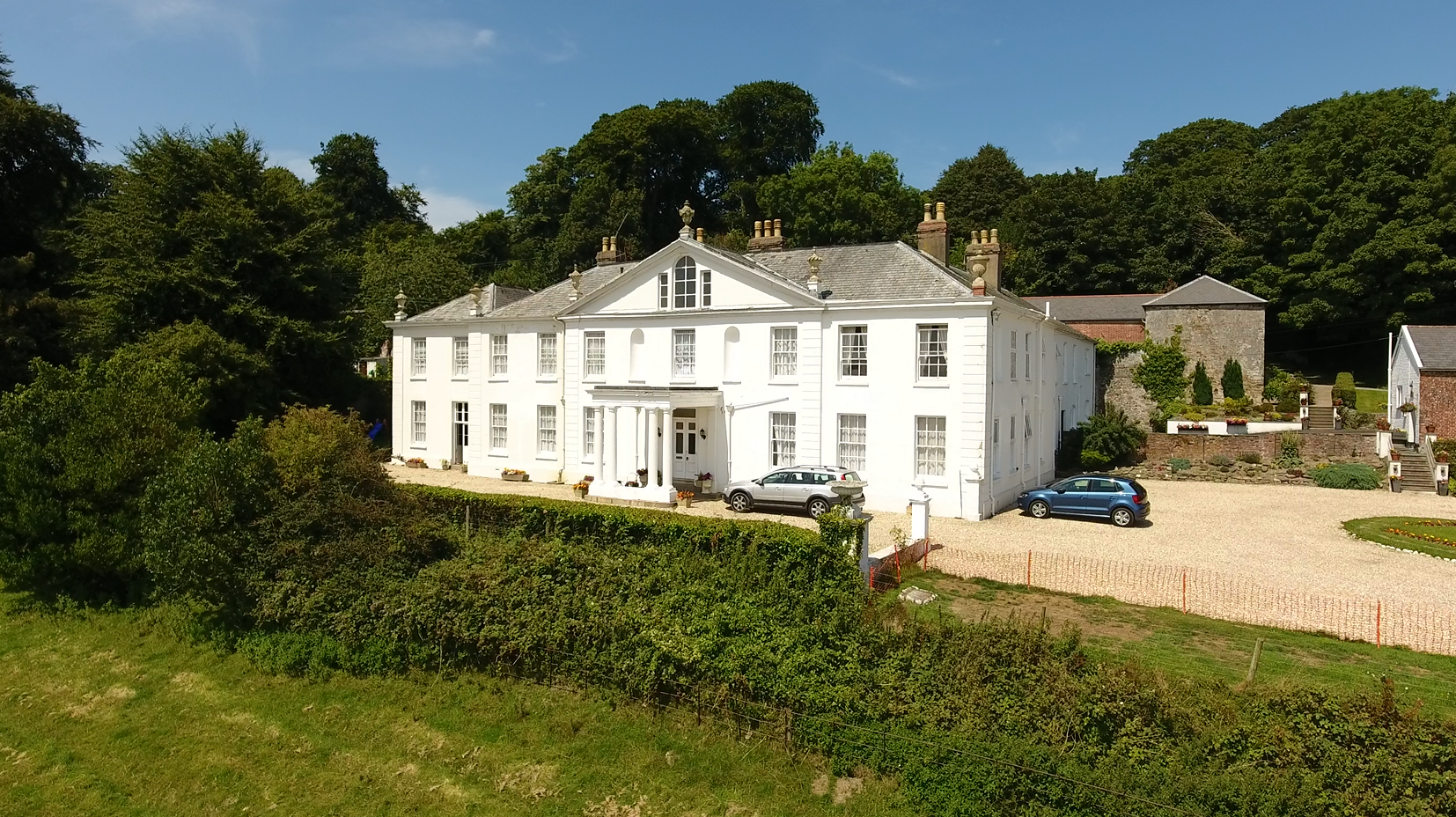
Upcott House in the parish of Pilton, Devon, residence of William Harding from 1866. Built mid-18th c. (rainwater head dated "1752") by Thomas Harding (1708-1772), grandfather of William Harding, remodelled mid-19th c.

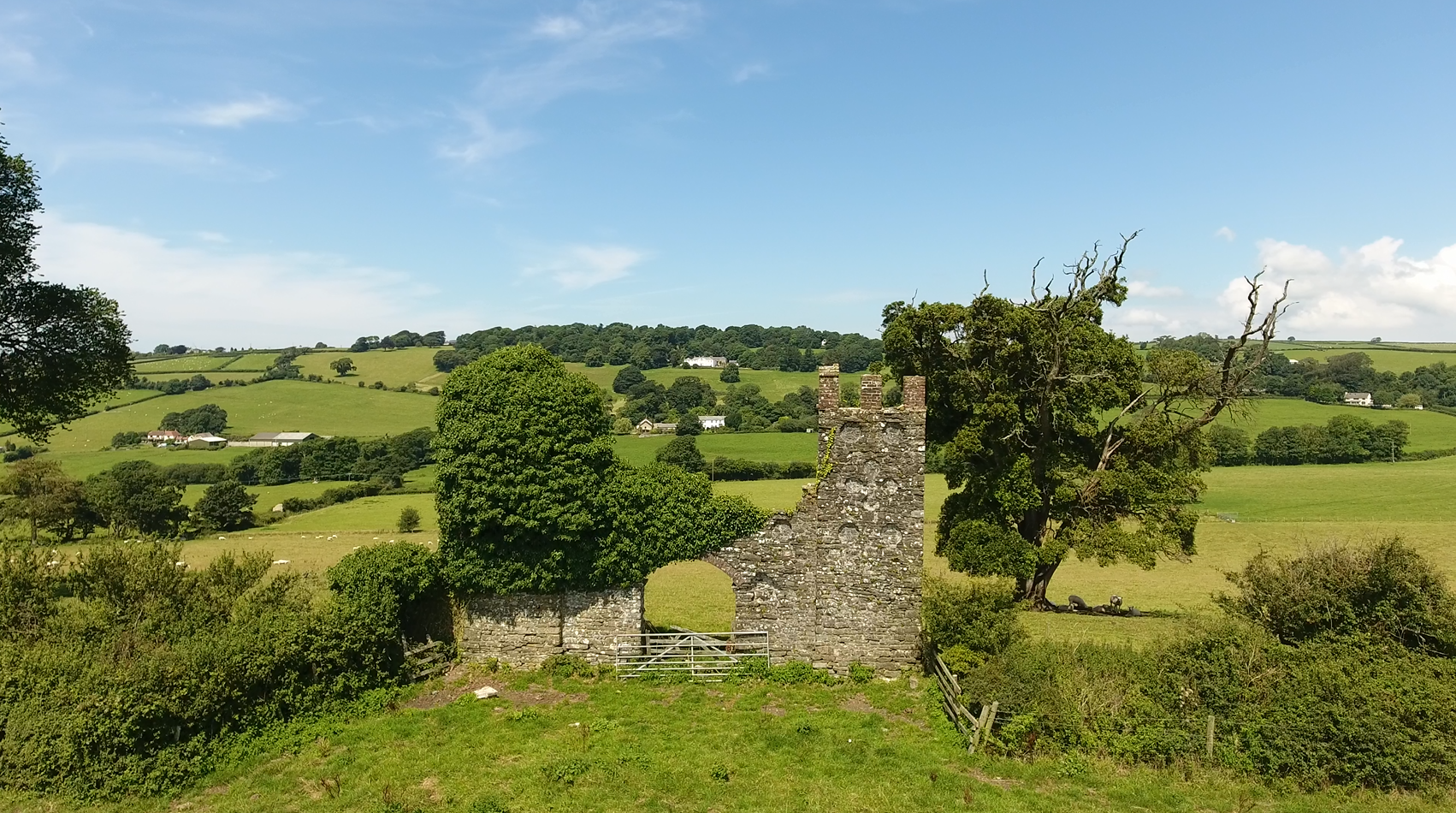
Sham Castle Folly built on his Upcott estate by William Harding, looking north with Upcott House in higher distance

Lieutenant-Colonel William Harding (16 August 1792 – 13 January 1886) of Upcott in the parish of Pilton in Devon, was a British antiquary, geologist and army officer. He was a Fellow of the Geological Society and after his retirement from the Army was an active member of the Exeter Diocesan Architectural and Archaeological Society. He is known for his History of Tiverton (2 volumes) published in 1845 and 1847.

== Origins ==
He was born on 16 August 1792 at Upcott, the 3rd son of Robert Harding (1750–1804) of Upcott, (son of Thomas Harding (1708–1772) of Upcott by his wife Mary Bryan daughter of Richard Bryan of South Molton) by his wife Dyonisia Wrey (1759–1836) 2nd daughter of Sir Bourchier Wrey, 6th Baronet (c.1715–1784) of Tawstock Court, Devon (about 3 miles south of Upcott), a Member of Parliament for Barnstaple, Devon (1 mile south-east of Upcott), one of the most prominent noblemen and largest landowners in the county, being the heir of the Bourchier Earls of Bath of Tawstock. His younger brother, the fourth son, was Rev. John Harding (1800–1880), Rector of Goodleigh from 1831 until his death.

His family was related to the Harding family of Buzzacott in the parish of Combe Martin in North Devon, of whom an early member was Thomas Harding (1516–1572) a Roman Catholic priest and controversialist and one of the Worthies of Devon of the biographer John Prince (d.1723). In the early 1790s Richard Harding of the Buzzacott family was a founding partner of the surviving Devonshire law firm Brewer Harding & Rowe, whose early work involved the management of the Harding estates. After World War II it was acquired by Geoffrey Stallard, a London solicitor, and in 1988 the firm donated a large collection of Harding family papers to the North Devon Records Office.

== Career ==
Harding attended Blundell's School in Tiverton (1801–7), about 28 miles south-east of his home at Upcott, during which time his father died. In July 1811, aged 18, his military career commenced when he received a commission as ensign and served with the 5th Regiment of Foot (later renamed 5th Northumberland Fusiliers) during the Peninsular War, during which he was present at the Siege of Burgos (1812), the capture of Madrid (1812), and fought in the Battle of Vitoria (1813), Battle of the Pyrenees (July 1813), and the battles of Nivelle, Nive, Orthes and Toulouse, having been promoted Lieutenant in 1813. He was awarded the Military General Service Medal with six clasps.

Following the end of the war, in 1823 he obtained his own company, becoming captain of the 58th Foot and was posted to the recently built Military Ordnance Depot at Weedon Bec in Northamptonshire. In November 1826 he left the army as a major on half-pay.

== Retirement ==
In 1866, following the death of his elder brother Thomas Wrey Harding (1783–1866), he inherited the Upcott estate and lordship of the manor of Pilton. On a prominent hill on his estate of Upcott he built a large stone folly, described variously as either a "castellated sham gatehouse" (Pevsner) or a Triumphal Arch, which latter interpretation is believed to commemorate his military service during the Peninsular War. This survives today, somewhat dilapidated, as a prominent landmark visible from the main road between Barnstaple to Braunton. In 1850 he paid for the building of three of the turrets on Pilton Church. He spent the last years of his life working on his huge collection of papers mostly relating to the churches, memorials and families of Devon. These remain unpublished and following his death were deposited in the Athaneum in Barnstaple. A Report on the Harding Collection was published in 1870 by the Devonshire Association.

== Marriage and children ==
In January 1824 at Weedon Bec he married Ann Elizabeth Jones (d.1893), who survived him and by whom he had two sons, who predeceased him unmarried and without children of their own, and one daughter, who also predeceased him, as follows:

- Robert William Harding (1824–1851), eldest son, educated at Blundell's School, matriculated at Balliol College, Oxford in 1842, a barrister-at-law of the Inner Temple in 1851. He died in Exeter in 1851 aged 27. His joint monument with his brother is in Pilton Church.
- Capt. Thomas Henry Harding (1826–1856), Royal Artillery, educated at Blundell's School, died aged 30, buried at Barnstaple, near Upcott. His joint monument with his brother is in Pilton Church.
- Maria Elizabeth Harding (1830–1846), died aged 16, to whom he erected a monument in St Peter's Church, Tiverton.

== Death and burial ==
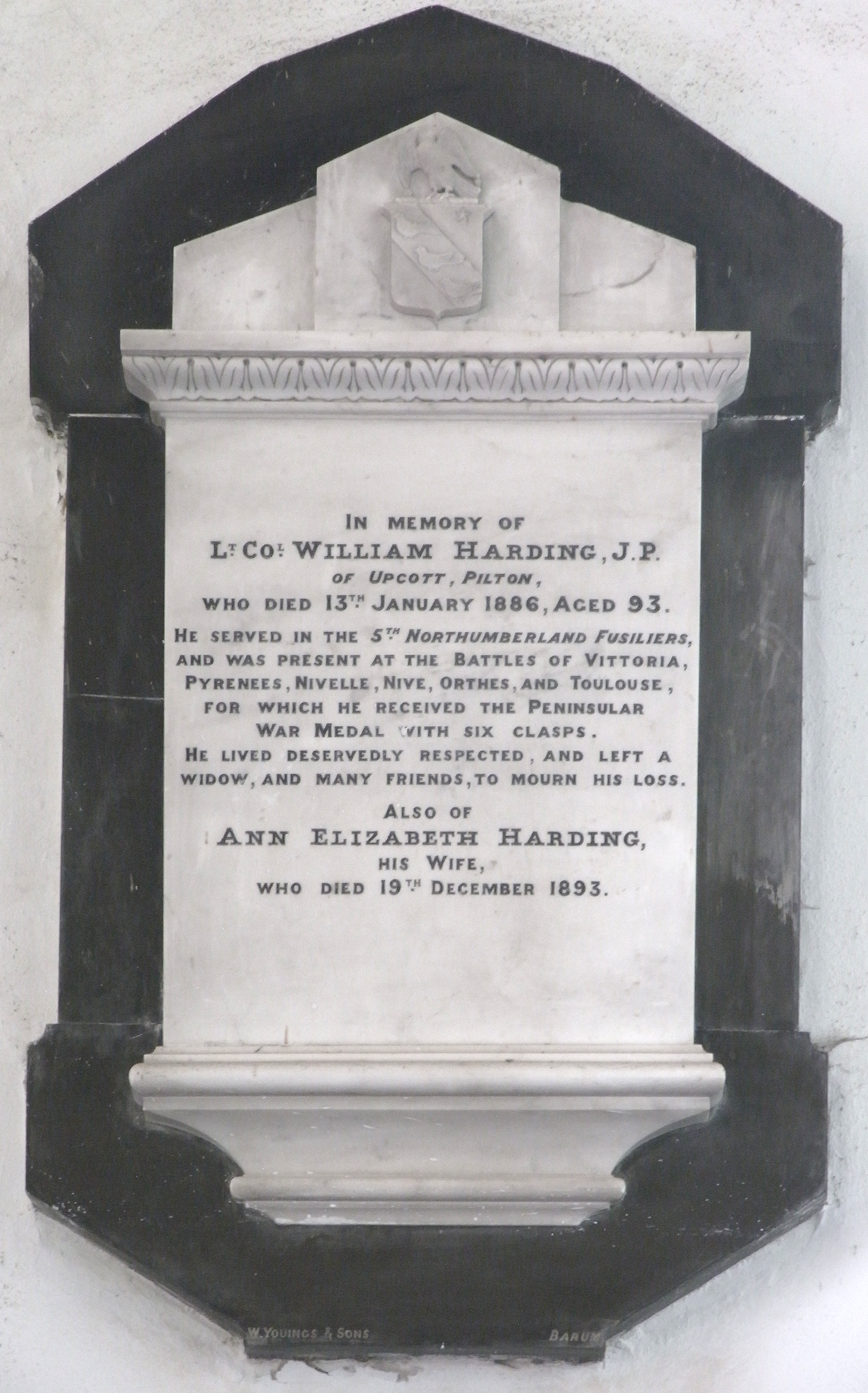
Monument to William Harding in Pilton Church

He died on 13 January 1886 at Upcott and his funeral was held in Pilton Church, to which his coffin had been accompanied by a large procession including his tenantry and estate workers. He was buried in the churchyard of Pilton Church, inside which survives his mural monument, on the centre of the west wall, inscribed as follows:

"In memory of Lt Col William Harding JP of Upcott, Pilton, who died 13th January 1886 aged 93. He served in the 5th Northumberland Fusiliers and was present at the Battles of Vittoria, Pyrenees, Nivelle, Nive, Orthes and Toulouse, for which he received the Peninsular War Medal with six clasps. He lived deservedly respected and left a widow and many friends to mourn his loss. Also of Ann Elizabeth Harding his wife who died 19th December 1893".

Arms above: Or, on a bend sable three martlets of the field (Harding), a mullet for difference of a 3rd son. Crest: A falcon rising. Monument marked: W.Youings & Son, Barum

== Succession ==
He was succeeded by his kinsman Colonel John Stafford Goldie Harding (1856–1936), OBE, of the Devon Regiment, who commenced his military service in 1874 with the Devon Militia and later served with the 3rd (which he later commanded) and 4th Battalions of the Devonshire Regiment. In World War I he served as Chief Recruiting Officer for Devonshire. John Stafford Goldie Harding was buried at Instow in North Devon.

== List of works ==
- The History of Tiverton in the County of Devon,
  - Volume I, Books I & II, Tiverton, 1845
    - Historical Memoirs etc., Book I, General History and Remarkable Occurrences, pp. 1–273
    - Historical Memoirs etc., Book II, Lords of the Manor, pp. 1–119
  - Volume II, Books III & IV, Tiverton, 1847
    - Historical Memoirs etc., Book III, Public Donations, pp. 1–280
    - Historical Memoirs etc., Book IV, Antiquities, Public Buildings, And Biographical Notices, pp. 1–94 (Index for Books I-IV, pp. 95 et seq )
- Harding Collection (unpublished), North Devon Ataneum, Barnstaple.
- Morwenstow Church, Transactions of Exeter Diocesan Architectural and Archaeological Society, 1867.
