= Harry Harding =

Harry Harding may refer to:

- Harry Harding (political scientist) (born 1946), American politician scientist, China specialist
- Harry Harding (politician), Canadian politician, member of the Newfoundland and Labrador House of Assembly
- Harry Harding, stage name Hazza, Australian singer and television presenter

== See also ==
- Henry Harding (disambiguation)
- Harold Harding (1900–1986), British civil engineer
- Harold Hardinge, English cricketer and footballer
