= Lake Harding (Minnesota) =

Lake in the state of Minnesota, United States

- Location within Minnesota
- Location: Meeker County, Minnesota
- Coordinates: 44°59′N 94°30.5′W
- Type: lake

Lake Harding is a lake in Meeker County, in the U.S. state of Minnesota.

Lake Harding was named for W. C. Harding, a local reverend.

== See also ==
- List of lakes in Minnesota
