= Harding, Georgia =

Unincorporated community in Georgia, US

Coordinates: 31°31′40″N 83°25′45″W

Harding is an unincorporated community in Tift County, in the U.S. state of Georgia.

== History ==
A post office called Harding was established in 1896, and remained in operation until 1901. According to tradition, the toponym Harding is a transfer from Massachusetts.
