= James Harding =

James Harding or Jim Harding may refer to:

- J. Barclay Harding (1830–1865), publisher of the Philadelphia Evening Telegraph
- Jim Harding (1924–2000), American basketball coach
- Jim Harding (American football), American football coach
- James Harding (cricketer), English professional cricketer
- James Harding (explorer) (1838–1864), English explorer
- James Harding (harbourmaster) (1811–1867)
- James Harding (journalist) (born 1969), British journalist and former Director of BBC News
- James A. Harding (1848–1922), early influential leader in the Church of Christ
- James Duffield Harding (1798–1863), English landscape painter
- James McKay Harding (1926–1995), political figure in Nova Scotia, Canada
- James Harding (music writer) (1929–2007), writer on music and theatre
- James Havelock Harding (1883–1978), master shipwright and shipbuilder
- James C. Harding (born 1934), United States Air Force officer
- Nick Zedd (né James Franklyn Harding III, 1956–2022)
- Jim Harding, Canadian professor, author of Canada's Deadly Secret
- James Harding (runner) (born 2003), New Zealand middle-distance runner

== See also ==
- Jamie Harding (born 1979), English actor
- Jaime Harding (born 1975), singer with British band Marion
- James Hardin (disambiguation)
