= Paul Harding =

Paul Harding may refer to:

- Paul Harding (Australian rules footballer) (born 1964), English-born Australian rules footballer
- Paul Harding (English footballer) (born 1964), English association football (soccer) player
- Paul Harding, pen-name for English writer Paul C. Doherty (born 1946)
- Paul Harding (author) (born 1967), American author, previously drummer for Cold Water Flat
- Paul "El Hornet" Harding, DJ and co-founder of Australian-British drum and bass band Pendulum
- Paul Harding High School, a high school in northeast Indiana that was closed in 2011.

== See also ==
- Paul Hardin (disambiguation)
