= Phil Harding =

Phil Harding may refer to:

- Phil Harding (archaeologist) (born 1950), British field archaeologist and television personality on Time Team
- Phil Harding (producer) (born 1957), British music engineer, producer, and remixer best known for partnership with keyboardist Ian Curnow
- Phil Harding (BBC executive), journalist and media consultant, former editor at the BBC
