= Kenneth R. Harding =

Sergeant at Arms of the US House of Representatives

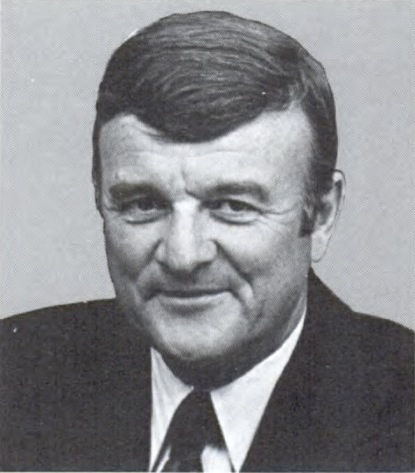

31st Sergeant at Arms of the United States House of Representatives
- In office October 1, 1972 – February 29, 1980
- Leader: Carl Albert; Tip O'Neill
- Preceded by: Zeake W. Johnson Jr.
- Succeeded by: Benjamin J. Guthrie

Personal details
- Born: March 28, 1914 Medina, New York
- Died: October 3, 2007 (aged 93) Ormond Beach, Florida
- Education: George Washington University

Kenneth R. Harding (March 28, 1914 – October 3, 2007) served as Sergeant at Arms of the United States House of Representatives from October 1, 1972, until February 29, 1980.

== Personal life ==
Harding was born on March 28, 1914, in Medina, New York. His parents were Victor Hunt Harding and Edith Falk Harding. He graduated from George Washington University Law School in 1937. He married his first wife, Jane Wedderburn Harding, in 1938. The couple were married for 68 years until her death in 2005.

== Career ==
Harding served in the U.S. Navy for three years and the U.S. Air Force Reserves for ten years. He retired from the Reserves as a full Colonel. He went on to become executive director of the Democratic Congressional Campaign Committee in 1954, which he held for 18 years.

Harding worked in some capacity on Capitol Hill for over thirty years and served as Sergeant at Arms of the United States House of Representatives from October 1, 1972, until February 29, 1980. He moved to Ormond Beach, Florida, upon his retirement.

== Death ==
Harding died of pneumonia at Ormond Beach Memorial Hospital in Florida on October 3, 2007, at the age of 93. He was survived by his second wife, Ruth Campbell Harding, four sons, Kenneth (Honolulu), Richard (Savannah), Bruce (New York), and Victor (Orlando), and thirteen grandchildren, including actor and television host, Zay Harding and physician-author, Kelli Harding.

Political offices
Preceded by Zeake W. Johnson Jr.	31st Sergeant at Arms of the United States House of Representatives; October 1, 1972 – February 29, 1980	Succeeded by Benjamin J. Guthrie
