= James N. Hardin Jr. =

American Germanist (1939–2026)

- Born: James Neal Hardin Jr. February 17, 1939; Nashville, Tennessee, U.S.
- Died: March 16, 2026 (aged 87)
- Education: Washington and Lee University; University of North Carolina at Chapel Hill
- Occupation: Germanist
- Spouse: Anne Farr

James Neal Hardin Jr. (February 17, 1939 – March 16, 2026) was an American Germanist.

== Early life and career ==
Hardin was born in Nashville, Tennessee, on February 17, 1939. He attended Washington and Lee University, earning his BA degree in German in 1960. In the same year, he was awarded a Fulbright scholarship, attending the Free University of Berlin, which after attending at Berlin, he attended the University of North Carolina at Chapel Hill, earning his MA degree in 1964 and his PhD degree in 1967, majoring in German literature. After earning his degrees, he served in the United States Army's Field Artillery from 1967 to 1969.

Hardin served as a professor in the department of Germanic, Slavic, oriental languages and literatures at the University of South Carolina from 1969 to 1999. During his years as a professor, he was named a distinguished professor.

== Personal life and death ==
Hardin was married to Anne Farr. Their marriage lasted until Hardin's death in 2026.

He died on March 16, 2026, at the age of 87.
