= Ali Eisami =

Kanuri man liberated from slavery by the British Navy

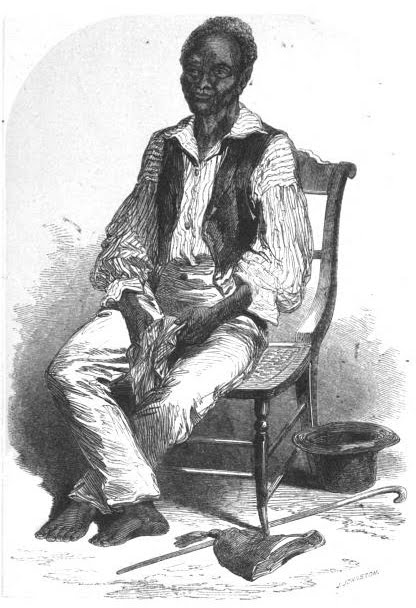
Ali Eisami, from Koelle's Kanuri grammar. (Possibly the engraving for the frontispiece was based on a photograph.)

Ali Eisami Gazirma, that is, Ali, the son of Eisa, from Gazir, (born 1789–1790), later known as William Harding, was a Kanuri man from Bornu. He was enslaved in around 1814 in the aftermath of warefare in Western Bornu. After being sold at a coastal slave market, he and other captives were liberated at sea in 1818 by the British Royal Navy, who enforced the Blockade of Africa to abolish the Atlantic slave trade. They were resettled as Liberated Africans in the colony of Sierra Leone in West Africa, where Eisami spent the rest of his life. Between 1848 and 1852 he worked with the German missionary Sigismund Koelle in creating a Kanuri grammar. In the process, Koelle recorded a range of fables, stories and reports, as well as a short autobiographical sketch of Eisami.

== Biography ==
Ali Eisami was born in Magirari Tapsoua in the Gazir province of the Kanem–Bornu Empire, in 1789 or 1790 (in the area of present-day Niger, Nigeria and Chad). His father was a mallam, a scholar, and Eisami was educated four years according to Islamic tradition. Afterwards a series of natural crises befell Bornu, and around 1808, when Eisami was nineteen years old, what he refers to as the "Fulata Wars", began. Attacks by armed groups under the leadership of Fulbe scholars severely unsettled Bornu and Eisami witnessed two conquests of the capital Ngazargamu close to which he lived. With the first, his family lost their home, with the second Eisami lost his family, and joined the following of a nearby group of Shuwa.

After three years, however, he was waylayed by a group of Fulbe while on a journey, who captured him and sold him into slavery. Taken with other slaves west through the Hausa Kingdoms, Eisami was held captive in Yorubaland for around 4 years. There Eisami was a witness to Afonja's rebellion against the Oyo Empire. In consequence of this in 1817 his Yoruba owner sold him to a slave market at the coast since Afonja had begun freeing slaves if they would join his army. Eisami was taken on board by European slavers to sail for the New World, but after several weeks at sea the slave ship was intercepted by the British Royal Navy. The captives were liberated and taken to Sierra Leone, a British colony established in 1808 to resettle freed slaves, where they arrived in April 1818.

In Sierra Leone, under governor Charles MacCarthy, thousands of liberated slaves were settled, some of which were given out as apprentices, which is often considered a form of disguised slavery. Others were settled in specially designed Liberated African villages overseen by mostly German missionaries in the service of the British Church Missionary Society. Initially subsidized by the government, the newly freed people were expected to become self-sufficient. Eisami was resettled in Bathurst, a newly founded village in the mountains close to Freetown overseen by the superintendent Rev. Decker. There he was soon baptized, with which, as was common, he took on an English name, William Harding. The superintendent in charge, Rev. Decker, appointed him constable and also married him and his wife shortly after his arrival. Afterwards the couple settled with a group of Kanuri who had lived in Sierra Leone for some time already. Apart from one later period, the further course of his life remains obscure.

== Collaboration on the Kanuri Language ==
In early 1848 the missionary linguist Sigismund Koelle, who was planning to produce a grammar of the Kanuri language, was searching for a counterpart. Soon he chose Eisami, whom he describes as „a man of good common sense, of more than ordinary strength of memory, and of an unblameable moral character", to help him learn and translate the language. This eventually resulted in the Grammar of the Bornu or Kanuri Language, published in 1854. As a basis for his 'grammatical investigations' Koelle had collected a 'literature' in Kanuri, by recording a wide range of literary narrations, personal stories and political reports from Eisami word for word. A selection of the around 800 manuscript pages was also published in 1854 as African Native Literature, containing the original texts together with an english translation and an extensive vocabulary. Just as the publication of the native language texts was unusual, so was the fact that Koelle presented his partner to the public in the introductions to the books resulting from their intellectual collaboration, and thus made Ali Eisami known.

== Bibliography ==
=== Works with Sigismund Koelle ===
- Koelle, S. W. (1854). African Native Literature, or Proverbs, Tales, Fables, & Historical Fragments in the Kanuri or Bornu Language: To which are added a translation of the above and a Kanuri-English vocabulary
- Koelle, S. W. (1854). Grammar of the Bornu Or Kanuri Language
