= Harding, West Virginia =

Unincorporated community in West Virginia, US

Coordinates: 38°56′53″N 79°57′33″W

Harding is an unincorporated community in Randolph County, in the U.S. state of West Virginia.

== History ==
A post office called Harding was established in 1892, and remained in operation until 1959. The community was named after French Harding, a Confederate war veteran. Harding was incorporated in 1900.
