= Megan McCormick =

American TV presenter (born 1972)

- Born: Megan Leah McCormick; August 8, 1972 (age 54); Glendale, Ohio
- Education: Boston University (BSc)
- Occupation: TV presenter
- Notable credit: Globe Trekker
- Spouse: Gethin Aldous
- Children: Rie, Laszlo
- Website: pilotguides.com,seanationtv.com

Megan Leah McCormick (born August 8, 1972) is an American TV presenter, who is one of the main hosts of the Pilot Productions travel-adventure series Globe Trekker (also called Pilot Guides in Australia, Canada and the United States and originally broadcast as Lonely Planet). She also hosted the television series Sea Nation, which aired in 2010.

== Professional work ==
McCormick was born in Cincinnati, Ohio and raised in Florida. As a child, she had an interest in ballet. In 1996, she began a job in Japan teaching English and has also worked as a social worker. She graduated from Boston University with a B.S. degree in Philosophy and Political Science and currently resides in New York City.

Since 1998, she has been a presenter on Globe Trekker, and has hosted episodes on Vietnam, Greece, Italy, Ghana, Indonesia, Sri Lanka, China, India, Egypt, and Japan. She hosted the New England episode, where she herself attended university. Production of this episode was difficult for her and the crew, as filming had just begun as the 9/11 attacks occurred. She also presented Treks in a Wild World, a show which emphasizes ecotourism and history and also has adventure elements. Before joining Pilot Productions, McCormick worked behind the scenes on The News with Brian Williams on the CNBC and MSNBC cable networks.

She was the host of Sea Nation, a television series that followed her and a friend as they sold everything and abandoned the comfort and security of their everyday lives. Eleven episodes were made. There are plans for a second series of Sea Nation to be made in the Mediterranean.

== Personal ==
McCormick is married to Gethin Aldous. Aldous is a sound recordist and they met while filming the Pilot Guides/Globe Trekker series. They have two children, daughter Rie (born 2004) and son Laszlo Lucca Thomas Aldous (born 2010).
