= Justice Harding =

Justice Harding may refer to:

- Major B. Harding (born 1935), chief justice of the Supreme Court of Florida
- Stephen S. Harding (1808–1891), chief justice of the Colorado Supreme Court
