= Jeff Harding =

Jeff Harding may refer to:

- Jeff Harding (actor), American actor
- Jeff Harding (boxer) (born 1965), Australian boxer
- Jeff Harding (ice hockey) (born 1969), Canadian ice hockey player
