= Zay Harding =

American actor

- Born: Zavan Kerr Harding; November 1, 1974 (age 51); Lihue, Hawaii
- Other name: Zay Harding
- Education: Southern Methodist University (B.F.A., 1997)
- Occupations: actor, television presenter
- Known for: actor in Spyder Games and presenter on Globe Trekker TV program
- Notable work: Globe Trekker, Digging For The Truth (Season 4), Treks In A Wild World, Tough Trains, Tough Boats, Tough Trucks, Tribal Challenge, Spyder Games, Hawaii Five-O, American Horror Story, Embark w/NCL, Extreme Green
- Spouse: Laura Salem-Harding
- Children: Oliver, Scarlet Olivia
- Website: zayharding.com

Zavan Kerr "Zay" Harding (born November 1, 1974) is an American television personality and actor, who may be best known as "Jeff Northcutt" on the MTV television serial, Spyder Games, and as a host of the adventure travel television series, Globe Trekker. He is also the host of Tough Trains, a docu-travel series from the English producers of Globe Trekker. In his more than 20 years of on-camera experience, Zay has hosted shows on PBS, OLN, National Geographic, Travel, Discovery, and History channels. Other notable TV appearances include guest-starring and co-starring roles on CBS's Hawaii Five-0, FX's American Horror Story and ABC's Mistresses.

He graduated with honors from Punahou School on Oahu, Hawaii, in 1993; and Southern Methodist University in Dallas, Texas, with a B.F.A. degree in 1997, with a minor in Art.

Zay was named after his legendary great-grandfather on his mother's side, Zay Jeffries — American mining engineer; metallurgist; awarded Doctor of Science from Harvard University; inventor of original Selson Blue formula; 1946 recipient of the John Fritz Medal; vice-president of General Electric (GE); recipient of President Truman's Medal for Merit for developing artillery shells capable of piercing the armor of World War II German tanks to win the war; and consulting engineer on the Manhattan Project, which produced the first atomic bomb.

On his father's side, Zay is also the grandson of former sergeant at arms of the United States House of Representatives, Kenneth R. Harding.

Zay is currently [when?] co-producing an environmental show with VoLo Foundation and Pilot Productions in the U.K., called Extreme Green, in which they scour the planet for alternative solutions to climate change.
