= Cliff Almond (soccer) =

Australian soccer player

Personal information
- Full name: Cliff Almond
- Date of birth: 1930
- Place of birth: Cessnock, Australia
- Date of death: 4 November 2018 (aged 88)
- Place of death: Cessnock, Australia
- Positions: Full-back; right winger

Youth career
- Aberdare Rangers

Senior career*
Years	Team	Apps	(Gls)
1946–1947	Cessnock		
1947	North Shore		
1953–1954	Cessnock		
1954–1955	Stirling Albion	8	(0)
1955–1969	Cessnock		

International career
1955	Australia	3	(0)
- * Club domestic league appearances and goals

Cliff Almond was a former Australian professional soccer player who played as a forward. He was an international player for the Australia national soccer team.

His 24-year career included three spells at Cessnock, a brief stint at North Shore and played with Scottish club Stirling Albion playing eight league games. He reportedly played 464 games at club level, with more than 400 appearances at Cessnock.

== Early life ==
Cliff Almond was born in 1930. Growing up, he was a local colliery clerk until he changed to playing soccer.

== Club career ==
=== 1946–54: Cessnock and North Shore stint ===
Almond progressed from the Aberdare Rangers youth team in 1946, where he signed for Cessnock as a right winger. He first played for Cessnock at age 15 in the 1946 Gardiner Cup with big impressions from spectators.

He made a brief stint at Sydney club North Shore for a year in 1947.

=== 1954–69: English trials and third Cessnock spell ===
During mid-1954, Cliff Almond was set to travel to England to trial with English clubs Aston Villa and Newcastle United. He then played for Scottish club Stirling Albion on 31 December 1954 and played eight league games in the 1954–55 season.

He returned to Cessnock in 1955, where he moved to a defensive position and began his international career with the NSW state representative team and the Australia national soccer team. Almond played his final match for Cessnock in the Northern NSW top division at age 38.

== International career ==
Almond was selected as part of Australia's five-test match series against South Africa and played three games as captain. He was also selected for the NSW state representative side against South Africa in August 1955.

== Death ==
Cliff Almond died on 4 November 2018 at age 88 in his hometown Cessnock, Australia. His obituary was featured on 9 November 2018.

== Career statistics ==
=== International ===
National team	Year	Competitive		Friendly		Total	
National team	Year	Apps	Goals	Apps	Goals	Apps	Goals
Australia	1955	0	0	3	0	3	0

== Honours ==
Cessnock

- Northern NSW Division One Premiership: 1954, 1955, 1956, 1960
- Northern NSW Division One Championship: 1960
