= Sid Robinson (soccer) =

Australian soccer player

Personal information
- Full name: Sid Robinson
- Place of birth: Sydney, Australia
- Position: Full-back

Senior career*
Years	Team	Apps	(Gls)
?–?	Pyrmont	?	(?)

International career
1923	Australia	2	(0)
- * Club domestic league appearances and goals

Sid Robinson was a former Australian professional soccer player who played as a full-back for Pyrmont and the Australia national soccer team.

== International career ==
Mitchell began his international career with Australia in an international friendly, debuting in a 2–1 win over New Zealand as their first win in an international match. After his official international career, he played two extra matches against the English FA touring side in June–July 1925.

== Career statistics ==
=== International ===
National team	Year	Competitive		Friendly		Total	
National team	Year	Apps	Goals	Apps	Goals	Apps	Goals
Australia	1923	0	0	2	0	2	0
