= William Mitchell (soccer) =

Australian soccer player

Personal information
- Full name: William Mitchell
- Place of birth: Australia
- Position: Right winger

Youth career
- Caledonians

Senior career*
Years	Team	Apps	(Gls)
1920–1922	Queens Park	?	(?)
1922–1924	Brisbane City	?	(?)
1924–1929	Latrobe	?	(?)
1929	Pineapple Rovers	?	(?)
1930–1932	Latrobe	?	(?)

International career
1923	Australia	3	(0)
- * Club domestic league appearances and goals

William Mitchell was a former Australian professional soccer player who last played as a right winger for Latrobe and the Australia national soccer team.

== Club career ==
Mitchell began his senior club career by joining Queens Park in 1920. He transferred to Brisbane City in the 1922 season. In 1924, he joined his final club Latrobe until 1929, where he played for a year with Pineapple Rovers. He returned to Latrobe in 1930, winning three Queensland state Premierships in 1930, 1931 and 1932.

== International career ==
Mitchell began his international career as a right winger with Australia in an international friendly, debuting in a 2–1 win over New Zealand as their first win in an international match.

== Career statistics ==
=== International ===
National team	Year	Competitive		Friendly		Total	
National team	Year	Apps	Goals	Apps	Goals	Apps	Goals
Australia	1923	0	0	3	0	3	0
