= Jack Gilmore =

Australian soccer player

Personal information
- Full name: John William Gilmore
- Date of birth: 1894
- Place of birth: Alnwick, Northumberland, England
- Date of death: 28 July 1958 (aged 63–64)
- Place of death: Abermain, New South Wales, Australia
- Position: Forward

Senior career*
Years	Team	Apps	(Gls)
- Weston

International career
1923–1924	Australia	2	(1)
- * Club domestic league appearances and goals

John William Gilmore (b. 1894 – 28 July 1958), known as Jack Gilmore, was a former Australian professional soccer player who played as a forward for NSW club Weston and the Australia national soccer team.

He was described, when aged 21, as 5 feet 9.25 inches (1.76 m) tall, 138 pounds (62.6 kg) weight, chest of 34–37 inches (86–94 cm), fair complexion, blue eyes, and brown hair.

== Life ==
Gilmore was born in Alnwick, Northumberland, England in 1894, to Robert Gilmore, and migrated to Australia in 1913, at age 18. He was a worker in the mines and was playing local soccer.

In World War I, he served as a private in the Middle East and Flanders with the 35th Battalion, even playing soccer against a rival battalion. He was wounded by shell gas poisoning in April 1918. During this time he married Annie. (Note: National Archives of Australia records show the WWI records amended to show wife Annie, but undated. In 1916 in the Kurri Kurri district, John William Gilmore married Annie Isabella Dryden (NSW births, deaths and marriage records). 1949, 1954, and 1958 electoral rolls show them living at Harle Street, where he was a miner.)

He spent his entire family life in Abermain as he enjoyed playing soccer locally at Weston playing for the Weston Workers Bears. When playing for the club, the club formed nickname for notable players called the "Geordie" players. Jack earned the nickname "Terror of the Geordies" for his attacking skill.

Gilmore continued playing after his international career. In July 1931 Gilmore changed roles from playing to refereeing, with the Kurri Kurri–Aberdare game; although his attention to the duty was questioned as he followed the play and not hte players.

In 1945, aged 51, Gilmore was part of a large group of veteran players at Adamstown replayed the 1925 Gardiner Cup game.

Gilmore died in 28 July 1958. His wife Annie died in Sydney on 30 September 1963.

In 2007 he was posthumously inducted into the Hunter Region Sporting Hall of Fame.

== International career ==
Gilmore began his international career with Australia in June 1923 on their second historic tour against New Zealand, debuting in a 2–3 loss to New Zealand scoring his first goal on debut. He became the first player based at Weston to play an international match for Australia. He played once more, a year after in 1924 against Canada in a 0–0 draw.

In total he played four internationals for Australia, and scored a goal each against Canada and China. (Note: One website indicates two goals (Canada, China). The earlier newspaper indicates also goal against New Zealand. He may have scored three or more goals at internationals.)

== Career statistics ==
=== International ===
National team	Year	Competitive		Friendly		Total	
National team	Year	Apps	Goals	Apps	Goals	Apps	Goals
Australia	1923	0	0	1	1	1	1
Australia	1924	0	0	1	0	1	0
Career total		0	0	2	1	2	1

Scores and results list Australia's goal tally first, score column indicates score after each Australia goal.

List of international goals scored by Jack Gilmore
No.	Date	Venue	Opponent	Score	Result	Competition	Ref.
1	16 June 1923	Sydney Cricket Ground, Sydney, Australia	New Zealand	–	2–3	Friendly	
