= Cliff Gedge =

Australian soccer player

Personal information
- Full name: Cliff Gedge
- Place of birth: Ipswich, Australia
- Position: Left-back

Senior career*
| Years | Team | Apps | (Gls) |
| 1922–1923 | Bundamba Rangers | | |
| 1923–? | Dinmore Bush Rats | | |

International career
| 1923 | Australia | 3 | (0) |
- * Club domestic league appearances and goals

Cliff Gedge was a former Australian professional soccer player who played as a full-back for Queensland clubs and the Australia national soccer team.

== Club career ==
Gedge spent many years playing in Ipswich. He moved to Dinmore Bush Rats in 1923. In 1924, Gedge had a one-year knee injury. He returned to club football in 1924 playing for the Dinmore Bush Rats as a goalkeeper for the rest of the 1920s.

== International career ==
Gedge began his international career with Australia in 1923 on their second historic tour against New Zealand, debuting in a 2–1 win over New Zealand. He played all matches in the 1923 test match series against New Zealand.

== Career statistics ==
=== International ===
| National team | Year | Competitive | | Friendly | | Total | |
| National team | Year | Apps | Goals | Apps | Goals | Apps | Goals |
|---|---|---|---|---|---|---|---|
| Australia | 1923 | 0 | 0 | 3 | 0 | 3 | 0 |
