= Sarah Ann Lillie Hardinge =

American painter

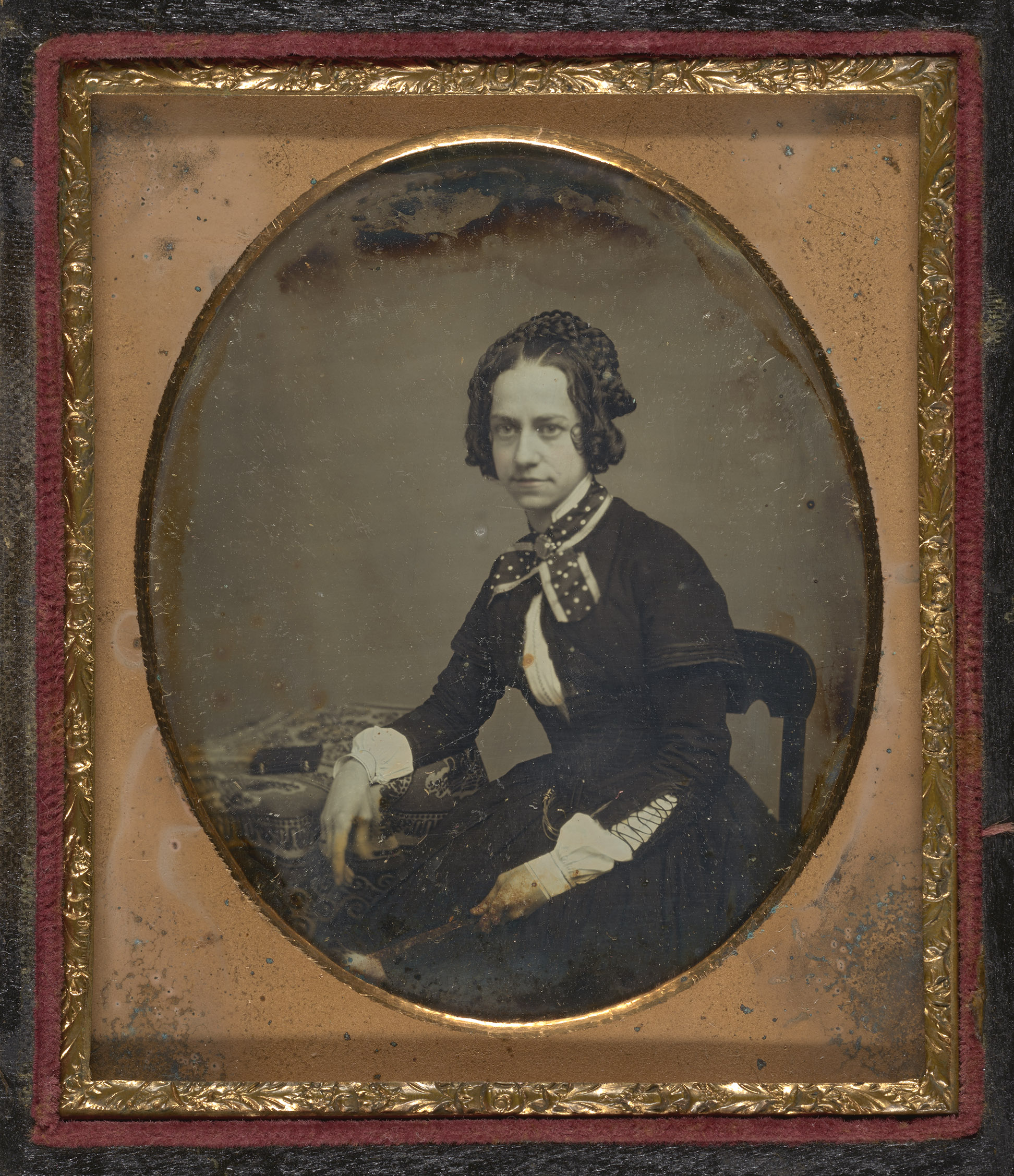
Daguerreotype of Sarah Ann Lillie Hardinge c. 1850

Sarah Ann Lillie Hardinge (née Bumstead, March 23, 1824 – October 13, 1913) was a self-taught painter whose watercolors of Texas, painted between 1852 and 1856, provide rare, early pictorial documentation of the territory. She is among the earliest female painters to depict the state. She later patented a photo-finishing process called Pearletta Pictures.

== Biography ==
Hardinge (née Bumstead) was born March 23, 1824, in New England. She was the youngest child in a middle-class family of nineteen children.

Hardinge married Dr. George Hardinge on November 14, 1851. After settling briefly in Brooklyn, the newlyweds left for Texas on January 29, 1852, to secure property Sarah inherited from her brother, Edward (d. May 29, 1850). Hardinge's letters to her family chronicled her life in Houston, Austin, Seguin, and San Antonio and travels around the state. During her time in Texas, she taught school, wrote, and painted. She and George had three sons, Edward (b. July 20, 1852), George (b. February 8, 1854) and Henry (b. 1855). She called the boys "our Trio Texans." Hardinge was motivated to bring "civilization" to Texas.

In March 1856, the Hardinge family left Texas, having failed in their efforts to sell the inherited property and been frightened by Indian raids. Hardinge kept a journal of the overland trip from Cibolo to Matagorda Bay, whence they embarked for Boston. Sarah Ann divorced George in 1865. She married the Reverend Harrison Daniels in 1875.

In 1869, Hardinge patented a photo-finishing process she named Pearletta Pictures. A wax layer applied to the surface of a photograph softened the image and permitted the addition of color and other special effects.

Hardinge died in East Orange, New Jersey, in 1913.

== Works ==
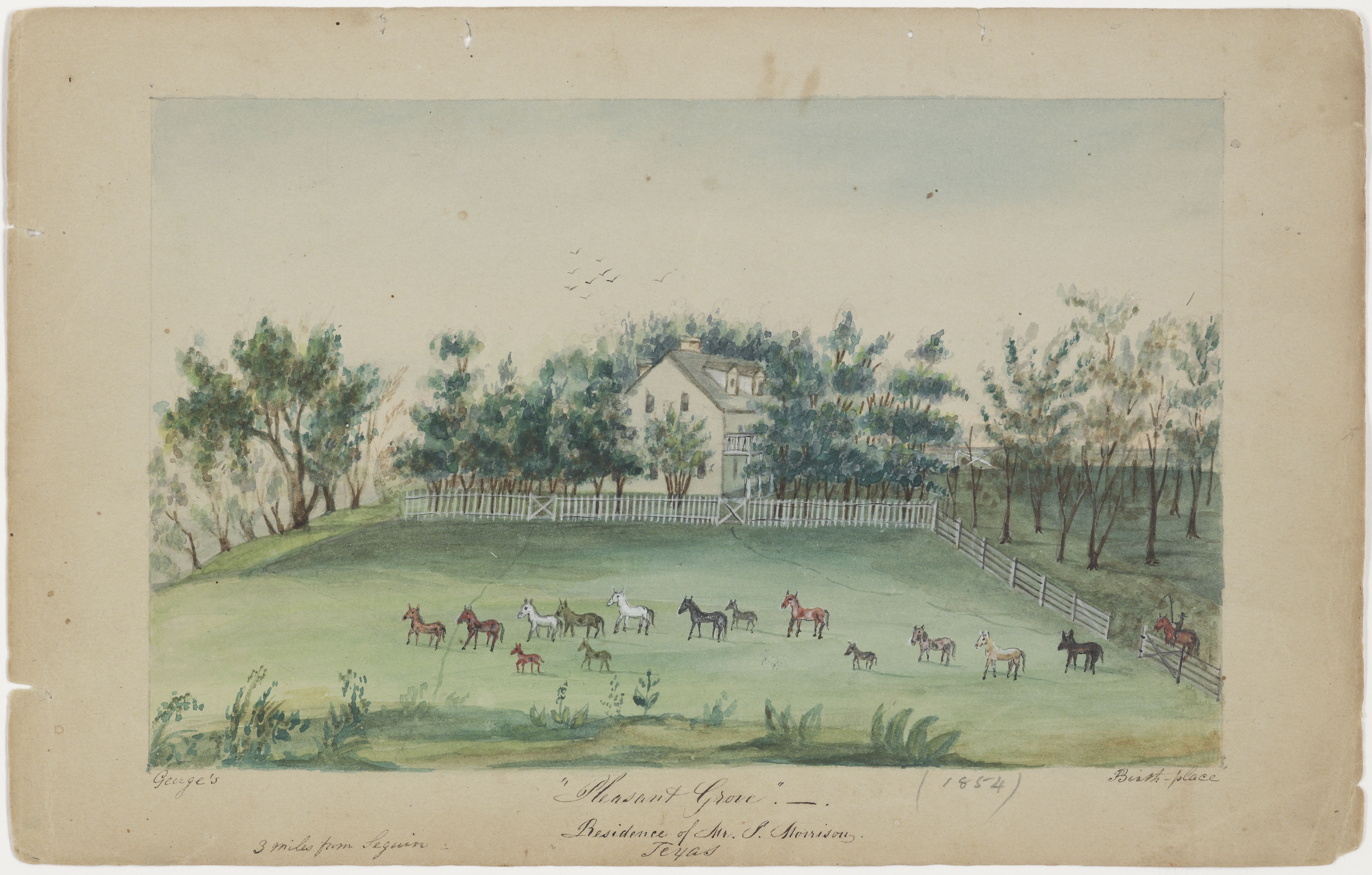
Sarah Ann Lillie Hardinge, "Pleasant Grove." Residence of Mr. J. Morrison. Texas 1853-1854 Transparent and opaque watercolor over graphite on paper Amon Carter Museum of American Art, Fort Worth, Texas, Gift of Natalie K. Shastid. 1984.3.9

Hardinge's watercolors provide some of the earliest images of the Texas territory, which had become part of the United States with the Treaty of Guadalupe ending the Mexican-American war in 1848. Hardinge was a self-taught artist. She mainly painted landscapes, views of Texas cities, and the homes of important Texans. She also painted missions and captured daily life on Texas plantations. American Heritage called her work "sharply observant." Her 1853-54 watercolor "Pleasant Grove" -- Residence of Mr. J. Morrison, Texas may include the earliest depiction of a Texas cowhand.

Some of her works are in the collection of the Amon Carter Museum of American Art. The museum collected 19 watercolors and part of her journal into a catalog called Views of Texas: Watercolors by Sarah Ann Lillie Hardinge (1988). It also included an introduction by Ron Tyler, the director of the Texas State Historical Association.
