= Jack White (soccer) =

Australian soccer player

Personal information
- Full name: John ("Jack") Travers Coates White
- Date of birth: 1899 (age 126–127)
- Place of birth: Grafton, New South Wales
- Position: Centre-half

Senior career*
Years	Team	Apps	(Gls)
1920–1923	Nambour		
1923	North Arm		
1923–1925	Pineapple Rovers		
1925	Cairns		

International career
1923–1924	Australia	3	(0)
- * Club domestic league appearances and goals

Jack White was a former Australian professional soccer player who last played as a half-back for Cairns. Often considered a versatile player, he was a selection three times for the Australia national soccer team.

== Club career ==
White first joined North Arm a railway siding just to the north of Nambour in 1923, where he began his international career in 1923. He moved to Brisbane to play with Pineapple Rovers in 1923 for two years. On 23 September 1925, he joined Cairns.

== International career ==
White began his international career with Australia in 1923 on their second historic tour against New Zealand, debuting in a 2–1 win over New Zealand. This was to be Australia's first win in an international match.

He played his final international match against Canada in June 1924.

== Career statistics ==
=== International ===
National team	Year	Competitive		Friendly		Total	
National team	Year	Apps	Goals	Apps	Goals	Apps	Goals
Australia	1923	0	0	2	0	2	0
Australia	1924	0	0	1	0	1	0
Career total		0	0	3	0	3	0
