= Baldwin (name) =

Baldwin is an Old Germanic and Anglo-Saxon name. It may derive either from Bealdwine, or the Old German equivalent Baldavin, meaning 'brave, bold friend'. Baldwin is Baudouin in Old French and Balduīnus in Latin, from Proto-Germanic *Balþawiniz, meaning "bold friend." In Arabic sources, the name is بالدوين (Bāldwīn).

It is found in many other modern European languages: Baudouin (French), Baldovino (Italian), Boudewijn (Dutch), Balduino (Spanish and Esperanto).

== People with the surname ==
- A. Michael Baldwin (born 1963), American actor
- Abraham Baldwin (1754–1807), American politician
- Adam Baldwin (born 1962), American actor
- Agnes Baldwin (disambiguation), several people
- Alec Baldwin (born 1958), American actor, oldest and best known of the "Baldwin brothers"
- Alfred Baldwin (disambiguation), several people
- Andrew Baldwin (born 1977), United States Navy officer, participant on The Bachelor television series
- Arthur Baldwin, 3rd Earl Baldwin of Bewdley (1904–1976), British businessman
- Augustus C. Baldwin (1817–1903), U.S. Representative from Michigan
- Augustus Warren Baldwin (1776–1866), politician in Upper Canada
- Bill Baldwin (1935–2015), United States science fiction writer
- Bob Baldwin (politician) (born 1955), Australian politician
- Bobby Baldwin (born 1950), United States poker player
- Brian Baldwin (1958–1999), American man executed in Alabama
- Brooke Baldwin (born 1979), CNN Newsroom anchor
- Brooks Baldwin (born 2000), American baseball player
- Cecil Baldwin, voice actor for the podcast Welcome to Night Vale
- Charles Baldwin (disambiguation), several people
- Charlotte Fowler Baldwin (1805–1873), American missionary
- Christopher Baldwin (born 1973), American illustrator and author of webcomics
- Chuck Baldwin (born 1952), 2008 Constitution Party nominee for President of the United States
- Clare Baldwin, American journalist
- Cliff Baldwin (1899–1979), American football player
- Craig Baldwin (born 1952), American filmmaker
- Cyrus Baldwin (1773–1854), American civil engineer
- Cyrus G. Baldwin (1852–1931) American minister, college professor, and college president
- Daniel Baldwin (born 1960), American actor, producer, and director, one of the "Baldwin brothers"
- Daniel P. Baldwin (1837–1908), American politician
- Daryl Baldwin, Miami researcher and cultural activist
- Dave Baldwin (disambiguation), several people
- Daylen Baldwin (born 1999), American football player
- Diana Baldwin (1948–2016), American coal miner
- Dick Baldwin (1911–1996), American actor
- Donny Baldwin (born 1951), American rock drummer
- Doug Baldwin (born 1988), American football player
- Doug Baldwin (ice hockey) (1922–2007), Canadian ice hockey player
- Drake Baldwin (born 2001), American baseball player
- Dwight Baldwin (disambiguation), several people
- Edith Ella Baldwin (1848–1920), American artist
- Edward Baldwin, 4th Earl Baldwin of Bewdley (1938–2021), British educator
- Lucky Baldwin (Elias J. Baldwin, 1828–1909), American entrepreneur, landowner, investor
- Ephraim Francis Baldwin (1837–1916), American architect
- Esther E. Baldwin (1840–1910), American missionary, teacher, translator, writer, editor
- Faith Baldwin (1893–1978), U.S. author of romance and fiction
- Frank Baldwin (1842–1923), one of only 19 servicemen to receive the Medal of Honor twice
- Frank Stephen Baldwin (1838–1925), American who invented a pinwheel calculator
- Frederick Walker Baldwin (1882–1948), hydrofoil and aviation pioneer
- Ged Baldwin (1907–1991), Canadian politician
- George Baldwin (disambiguation), several people
- Graham Baldwin (born c. 1954), British anti-cult activist
- Greg A. Baldwin (born 1946), American litigation attorney and partner
- Greg Baldwin (born 1960), American voice actor
- Hailey Baldwin, birth name of Hailey Bieber (born 1996), American model and businesswoman
- Harry Baldwin (cricketer) (1860–1935), English cricketer
- Harry Streett Baldwin (1894–1952), U.S. Congressman
- Henry Baldwin (disambiguation), several people
- Howard Baldwin (born 1942), American businessman
- Howard S. Baldwin (1934–2008), American politician and businessman
- Ira Baldwin (1895–1999), founder and director emeritus of the Wisconsin Academy Foundation
- Ireland Baldwin (born 1995), American fashion model
- James T. Baldwin (1933–2018), American industrial designer, author, and educator
- J. Rush Baldwin, American politician
- Jack Baldwin (disambiguation), several people
- James Baldwin (disambiguation), several people
- Jason Baldwin, one of the West Memphis Three
- Jerry Baldwin, American businessman
- John Baldwin (disambiguation), several people
- Johnathan Baldwin (born 2003), American football player
- Joseph Baldwin (disambiguation), several people
- Josh Baldwin (born 1979), Christian Singer/songwriter
- Kaine Baldwin (born 2002), Australian Football Player
- Kathleen Baldwin, American writer of comic romance novels
- Karen Dianne Baldwin (born 1963), Canadian actress
- Keith Baldwin (born 1960), American football player
- Lewis V. Baldwin, historian, author, and professor specializing in the history of the black churches in the United States
- Loammi Baldwin (1744–1807), American engineer, politician, and a soldier in the American Revolutionary War
- Loammi Baldwin Jr. (1780–1838), American civil engineer
- Mark Baldwin (disambiguation), several people
- Mary Briscoe Baldwin (1811–1877), American missionary educator
- Matthias W. Baldwin (1795–1866), American steam locomotive builder, founder of Baldwin Locomotive Works
- Melvin Baldwin (1838–1901), Representative from Minnesota
- Michele Baldwin (1966–2012) also known as Lady Ganga, stand up paddled 700 miles down the Ganges River to raise awareness of cervical cancer
- Mike Baldwin (motorcyclist) (born 1955), American professional motorcycle road racer
- Monaray Baldwin (born 2002), American football player
- Oliver Baldwin, 2nd Earl Baldwin of Bewdley (1899–1958), British socialist politician
- Owen Baldwin (1893–1942), British flying ace
- Patrick Baldwin Jr. (born 2002), American basketball player
- Percival G. Baldwin (1880–1936), American politician and businessman
- Peter Baldwin (disambiguation), several people
- Ralph N. Baldwin (1916–1982), Canadian-born harness racing driver and trainer
- Raymond E. Baldwin (1893–1986), United States Senator, the 72nd and 74th Governor of Connecticut
- Richard J. Baldwin (1853–1944), Pennsylvania State Representative, Pennsylvania State Senator, Speaker of the Pennsylvania House of Representatives
- Robert Baldwin (disambiguation), several people
- Roger Nash Baldwin (1884–1981), founder of ACLU
- Roger Sherman Baldwin (1793–1863), US lawyer and politician
- Roy E. Baldwin (born 1948), member of the Pennsylvania House of Representatives
- Roy Alvin Baldwin (1885–1940), member of the Texas House of Representatives
- Roy Baldwin (footballer) (1927–2016), Australian rules footballer
- Ruth Baldwin (c. 1761–1788), aka Ruth Bowyer, a convict sent to Australia on the First Fleet
- Sally Baldwin (1940–2003), University of York social sciences professor
- Shauna Singh Baldwin (born 1962), Canadian-American novelist
- Simeon Baldwin (1761–1851), son-in-law of Roger Sherman
- Simeon E. Baldwin (1840–1927), jurist, law professor and the 65th Governor of Connecticut
- Simon Baldwin (born 1975), English rugby league footballer
- Stanley Baldwin (1867–1947), later Earl Baldwin of Bewdley, three-time prime minister of the United Kingdom
- Stephen Baldwin (born 1966), American actor, youngest of the "Baldwin brothers"
- Stephen Baldwin (politician) (born 1982), American politician, West Virginia state Senator
- Sumner Baldwin (1833–1903), New York politician
- Tammy Baldwin (born 1962), American politician, Senator from Wisconsin, first openly homosexual Senator
- Theodore Anderson Baldwin (1839–1925), U.S. military officer during the American Civil War and the Spanish–American War
- Thomas Scott Baldwin (1860–1923), U.S. Army Major and pioneer balloonist
- Tom Baldwin (racing driver) (1947–2004), NASCAR Modified race driver
- Tommy Baldwin (1945–2024), English footballer
- Tommy Baldwin Jr. (born 1966), team majority owner of Tommy Baldwin Racing in the Monster Energy NASCAR Cup Series
- Tony Baldwin, (born 1973), college softball coach
- Wade Baldwin IV (born 1996), American basketball player for Maccabi Tel Aviv of the Israeli Basketball Premier League
- Walter Baldwin (1889−1977), American film and television actor
- William Baldwin (disambiguation), several people

== People with the mononym ==
- Baldwin I of Jerusalem (1058?–1118), also Baldwin I of Edessa
- Baldwin II of Jerusalem (died 1131), also Baldwin II of Edessa
- Baldwin III of Jerusalem (1130–1162)
- Baldwin IV of Jerusalem (1161–1185), a.k.a. the Leper King
- Baldwin V of Jerusalem (1177–1186)
- Baldwin I of Ramla (died 1138)
- Baldwin of Ibelin (early 1130s – c. 1187 or 1186/1188), also Baldwin III of Ramla
- Baldwin I of Flanders (probably 830s – 879)
- Baldwin II of Flanders (865–918), also Baldwin I of Boulogne
- Baldwin III of Flanders (c. 940–962)
- Baldwin IV of Flanders (980–1035)
- Baldwin V of Flanders (1012–1067)
- Baldwin VI of Flanders (c. 1030–1070), a.k.a. Baldwin the Good, also Baldwin I, Count of Hainaut
- Baldwin VII of Flanders (1093–1119)
- Baldwin I, Latin Emperor (1172–c.1205), also Baldwin IX of Flanders and Baldwin VI, Count of Hainaut
- Baldwin II, Latin Emperor (1217–1273), or Baldwin of Courtenay
- Baldwin II of Boulogne (died c. 1027)
- Baldwin II of Hainaut (1056–1098?)
- Baldwin III of Hainaut (1088–1120)
- Baldwin IV of Hainaut (1108–1171)
- Baldwin V of Hainaut (1150–1195), also Baldwin I of Namur (1189–1195), Baldwin VIII of Flanders (1191–1195)
- Baldwin of Forde (c. 1125–1190), Archbishop of Canterbury
- Baldwin of Biggar (fl. 1160–1170), Flemish/Scots magnate, Sheriff of Clydesdale
- Baldovin (fl. 1325–1345), Serbian noble
- Baldwin (abbot of Bury St Edmunds) (died 1097)
- Baldwin (archbishop of Pisa) (died 1145)
- Baldwin of Rieti (died 1140), saint
- Baldwin of Luxembourg (c. 1285–1354), Archbishop of Trier
- Baudouin of Belgium (1930–1993), called "Baldwin" in English

== People with the given name ==
- Baldwin de Redvers, 1st Earl of Devon (died 1155)
- Baldwin de Redvers, 6th Earl of Devon (1217–1245)
- Baldwin Domingo (1926–2020), American politician

== Fictional characters with the surname ==
- Robbie Baldwin, a superhero in Marvel Comics
- In the soap opera Coronation Street:
  - Carol Baldwin
  - Danny Baldwin
  - Frankie Baldwin
  - Jamie Baldwin
  - Mike Baldwin (Coronation Street)
  - Viv Baldwin
  - Warren Baldwin
- In the soap opera The Young and the Restless:
  - Eden Baldwin
  - Lauren Fenmore Baldwin
  - Michael Baldwin (The Young and the Restless)
  - River Baldwin
- Baldwin Montclair (A Discovery of Witches)
- Tom Baldwin (The 4400)
- Tom Baldwin (General Hospital)

== See also ==
- Baldwin I (disambiguation)
- Baldwin II (disambiguation)
- Baldwin III (disambiguation)
- Baldwin IV of Jerusalem
- Baldwin V of Jerusalem
- Baldwin VI (disambiguation)
- Baudouin (disambiguation)
- Boudewijn (given name)
