= Baldwin House =

Baldwin House may refer to the following buildings in the United States:

== California ==
- Lucky Baldwin's Queen Anne Cottage and Coach Barn in Arcadia
- Baldwin Estate, South Lake Tahoe; listed on the National Register of Historic Places (NRHP) in El Dorado County

== Connecticut ==
- Timothy Baldwin House, Branford
- Zaccheus Baldwin House, Branford
- Ives-Baldwin House, Meriden
- Gen. Daniel Baldwin House, a property in the Newtown Borough Historic District
- Amos Baldwin House, Norfolk
- George Baldwin House, North Branford

== Hawaii ==
- Dwight Baldwin (missionary) House, Lahaina

== Illinois ==
- Hiram Baldwin House, Kenilworth

== Indiana ==
- Kendrick-Baldwin House, Logansport

== Louisiana ==
- Dufour-Baldwin House, on Esplanade Avenue, New Orleans

== Maryland ==
- Baldwin House Hotel, in Hagerstown, Maryland

== Massachusetts ==
- Maria Baldwin House, Cambridge
- Baldwin House, Smith College, Northampton
- Locke-Baldwin-Kinsley House, Stoneham
- Baldwin House (Woburn, Massachusetts)

== Montana ==
- Baldwin House (Lodge Grass, Montana)

== New Jersey ==
- David Baldwin House, Midland Park

== New York ==
- James Baldwin House, on the National Register of Historic Places in Manhattan
- Benjamin Gordon Baldwin House, Norwood
- Daniel and Clarissa Baldwin House, Spencertown

== North Carolina ==
- Baldwin-Coker Cottage, Highlands

== Ohio ==
- Joseph W. Baldwin House, Wyoming

== Oregon ==
- Thomas M. Baldwin House, Prineville

== Pennsylvania ==
- Baldwin House hotel, part of the Coopersburg Historic District
- Baldwin-Reynolds House, Meadville; listed on the NRHP in Lamar County

== Rhode Island ==
- Charles H. Baldwin House, Newport

== Texas ==
- Benjamin and Adelaide Baldwin House, Paris; listed on the NRHP in Crawford County

== Utah ==
- Caleb Baldwin House, Beaver
- Charles Baldwin House, Salt Lake City
- Nathaniel Baldwin House, Salt Lake City; listed on the NRHP in Salt Lake County

== West Virginia ==
- Baldwin-Grantham House, Shanghai

== See also ==
- Queen Anne Cottage and Coach Barn, Arcadia, California, constructed by Lucky Baldwin
