= Baudouin =

Baudouin (pronounced [bodwɛ̃]) is a French masculine given name and surname, related to Baldwin.

Notable people with the name include:

== Given name ==
- Baudouin of Belgium (1930–1993), King of the Belgians from 1951 to 1993
- Prince Baudouin of Belgium (1869–1891), nephew of Leopold II, once an heir presumptive
- Baudouin, 12th Prince of Ligne (1918–1985), Belgian nobleman
- Baudouin de Lannoy (1388–1474), Flemish statesman and nobleman
- Baudouin de Brabandère (1894–1947), Belgian equestrian
- Baudouin des Auteus (fl. early 13th century), Picard trouvère
- Baudouin Liwanga Mata (born 1950), Congolese military officer and politician
- Baudouin Michiels (born 1941), Belgian businessman
- Baudouin Prot (born 1951), French economist
- Baudouin Oosterlynck (born 1946), Belgian composer, sound and visual artist
- Baudouin Ribakare (born 1956), Burundian football manager

== Surname ==
- Charles Baudouin (1893–1963), French-Swiss psychoanalyst
- Cyril Baudouin, French rugby league player
- Eugène Baudouin (1842–1893), French painter and printmaker
- François Baudouin (1520–1573), French humanist
- Gérald Baudouin (born 1972), French pole vaulter
- Gervais Baudouin (c. 1645–1700), French-Quebec surgeon
- Henri Baudouin (1926–2020), French politician
- Jan Baudouin de Courtenay (1845–1929), Polish linguist of French descent
- Jean-Louis Baudouin (born 1938), Canadian jurist
- Laurent Beaudoin (born 1938), Canadian businessman
- Louis-Marie Baudouin (1765–1835), French Catholic priest
- Manuel Achille Baudouin (1846–1917), French judge
- Michel Baudouin (1691–1768), Quebec Jesuit missionary
- Paul Baudouin (1894–1964), French banker and member of government
- Paule Baudouin (born 1984), French handball player
- Pierre-Antoine Baudouin (1723–1769), French painter
- Romualda Baudouin de Courtenay, (1857–1935), Polish historian
- Théodore Baudouin d'Aubigny (1786–1866), French playwright

== See also ==
- Baudoin
- Bauduin
- Boudewijn (given name)
- Bedouin, a nomadic people of Southwest Asia and North Africa
