= JBA =

JBA can refer to:

- The Joseph Baldwin Academy for Eminent Young Scholars
- All Japan B-Daman Association
- JBA Motors
- Jens Berthel Askou, a Danish association football player
- JetBlue Airways, is a major American airline low cost passenger carrier.
- John Brown's Army, a fictional terrorist organisation in Splinter Cell: Double Agent
- The Jumping Bomb Angels, a professional wrestling tag team
- Jewish Babylonian Aramaic, a Jewish language
- Joint Base Andrews, a U.S. military facility
- Junior Basketball Association, a professional basketball league for young men players
- JoJo's Bizarre Adventure, a Japanese manga series
- Japan Basketball Association
