= Roy Baldwin =

Roy Baldwin may refer to:

- Roy E. Baldwin (born 1948), member of the Pennsylvania House of Representatives
- Roy Alvin Baldwin (1885–1940), member of the Texas House of Representatives
- Roy Baldwin (footballer) (1927–2016), Australian rules footballer
