= George Baldwin =

George Baldwin may refer to:

- George Baldwin (diplomat) (1744–1826), British diplomat and mystical writer
- George Pearce Baldwin (1789–1840), British foundryman
- George Rumford Baldwin (1798–1888), American civil engineer
- George Baldwin (Wisconsin politician) (1830–1907), Wisconsin politician
- George C. Baldwin (1917–2010), American theoretical and experimental physicist and professor
- George Colfax Baldwin (1817–1899), American Baptist clergyman
- George Baldwin (footballer) (1921–1976), English player of association football
- George Baldwin (cricketer) (1878–1970), English cricketer
- George Baldwin (American football) (1923–2013), American football player and coach
- George Baldwin (Royal Navy officer) (1921-2005), Royal Navy officer and Fleet Air Arm aviator.

== See also ==
- George Baldwin Selden (1846–1922), American inventor
