= Senator Baldwin =

Senator Baldwin may refer to:

== Members of the United States Senate ==
- Abraham Baldwin (1754–1807), U.S. Senator from Georgia from 1799 to 1807
- Henry P. Baldwin (1814–1892), U.S. Senator from the state of Michigan
- Raymond E. Baldwin (1893–1986), U.S. Senator from Connecticut
- Roger Sherman Baldwin (1793–1863), U.S. Senator from Connecticut from 1847 to 1851
- Tammy Baldwin (born 1962), U.S. Senator from Wisconsin since 2013

== United States state senate members ==
- Abraham Dudley Baldwin (1788–1862), Connecticut State Senate
- Florence Eugene Baldwin (1825–1886), Minnesota State Senate
- Frederick W. Baldwin (Vermont politician) (1848–1923), Vermont State Senate
- George Baldwin (Wisconsin politician) (1830–1907), Wisconsin State Senate
- Henry Perrine Baldwin (1842–1911), Republic of Hawaii State Senate and Territory of Hawaii State Senate
- Howard S. Baldwin (1934–2008), Arizona State Senate
- John R. Baldwin (1854–1897), Massachusetts State Senate
- John Baldwin (Missouri politician) (1843–1934), Missouri State Senate
- Joseph C. Baldwin (1897–1957), New York State Senate
- Percival G. Baldwin (1880–1936), Illinois State Senate
- Richard J. Baldwin (1853–1944), Pennsylvania State Senate
- Stephen Baldwin (politician) (born 1982), West Virginia State Senate
- Sumner Baldwin (1833–1903), New York State Senate
