= Bauduin =

Surname list

Bauduin is a surname originating from France during the Dark Ages in Languedoc; it is derived from the personal name Baldwin. Notable people bearing this surname include:

- Anne-Marie Bauduin, French former gymnast
- Fernand Bauduin, French middle-distance runner
- Pierre François Bauduin, French general

== See also ==
- Baudouin (disambiguation)
- Baudoin
