= Boudewijn =

- Gender: Male
- Language: Dutch

Other names
- Variant form: Baldewinus
- Anglicisation: Baldwin

Boudewijn (pronounced [ˈbʌudəʋɛin]) is a Dutch masculine given name, equivalent to Baldwin. People with the name include:

== People with the given name ==
- Boudewijn of Belgium (1930–1993), King of the Belgians 1951–1993
- Boudewijn Binkhorst (1942–2021), Dutch sailor
- Boudewijn Vincent Bonebakker (born 1968), Dutch musician
- Boudewijn Karel Boom (1903–1980), Dutch botanist and author
- Boudewijn Bouckaert (born 1947), Belgian political theorist
- Boudewijn Büch (1948–2002), Dutch writer and television producer
- Boudewijn Buckinx (born 1945), Belgian composer
- Boudewijn Castelijn, Dutch field hockey coach
- Boudewijn Catz (c. 1601 – 1663), Dutch priest
- Boudewijn de Geer (born 1955), Dutch footballer
- Boudewijn de Groot (born 1944), Dutch singer-songwriter
- Boudewijn Hendricksz (died 1626), Dutch corsair and admiral
- Boudewijn van Offenberg (1590–1653), Dutch notary and merchant
- Boudewijn Poelmann (born 1949), Dutch entrepreneur
- Boudewijn Röell (born 1989), Dutch rower
- Boudewijn Sirks (born 1947), Dutch specialist on Roman Law
- Boudewijn Zenden (born 1976), Dutch footballer

== See also ==
- Boudewijn Seapark, Belgian amusement park
- Baudouin (disambiguation)
