= Charles Baldwin =

Charles Baldwin may refer to:

- Charles Baldwin (MP) (1593–?), English politician
- Charles Baldwin (American football) (born 1994), American Footballplayer
- Charles Baldwin (cricketer) (1864–1947), English cricketer
- Charles C. Baldwin (born 1947), former Chief of Chaplains of the United States Air Force
- Charles F. Baldwin (1902–1993), American diplomat
- Charles H. Baldwin (admiral) (1822–1888), American rear admiral in United States Navy
- Charles H. Baldwin (Medal of Honor) (1839–1911), American sailor on the USS Wyalusing
- Charles Sears Baldwin (1867–1935), American scholar and professor of rhetoric at Yale University
- Chuck Baldwin (born 1952), American 2008 Constitution Party presidential candidate from Florida
- Charles Barry Baldwin (1789–1859), British politician
- Charles C. P. Baldwin (1812–1893), government official in Vermont
