= Baldwin of Constantinople =

Baldwin of Constantinople may refer to:

- Baldwin I of Constantinople (also Baldwin IX of Flanders and Baldwin VI, Count of Hainaut, 1172–1205)
- Baldwin II of Constantinople (1217–1273)

== See also ==
- Baldwin (name)
