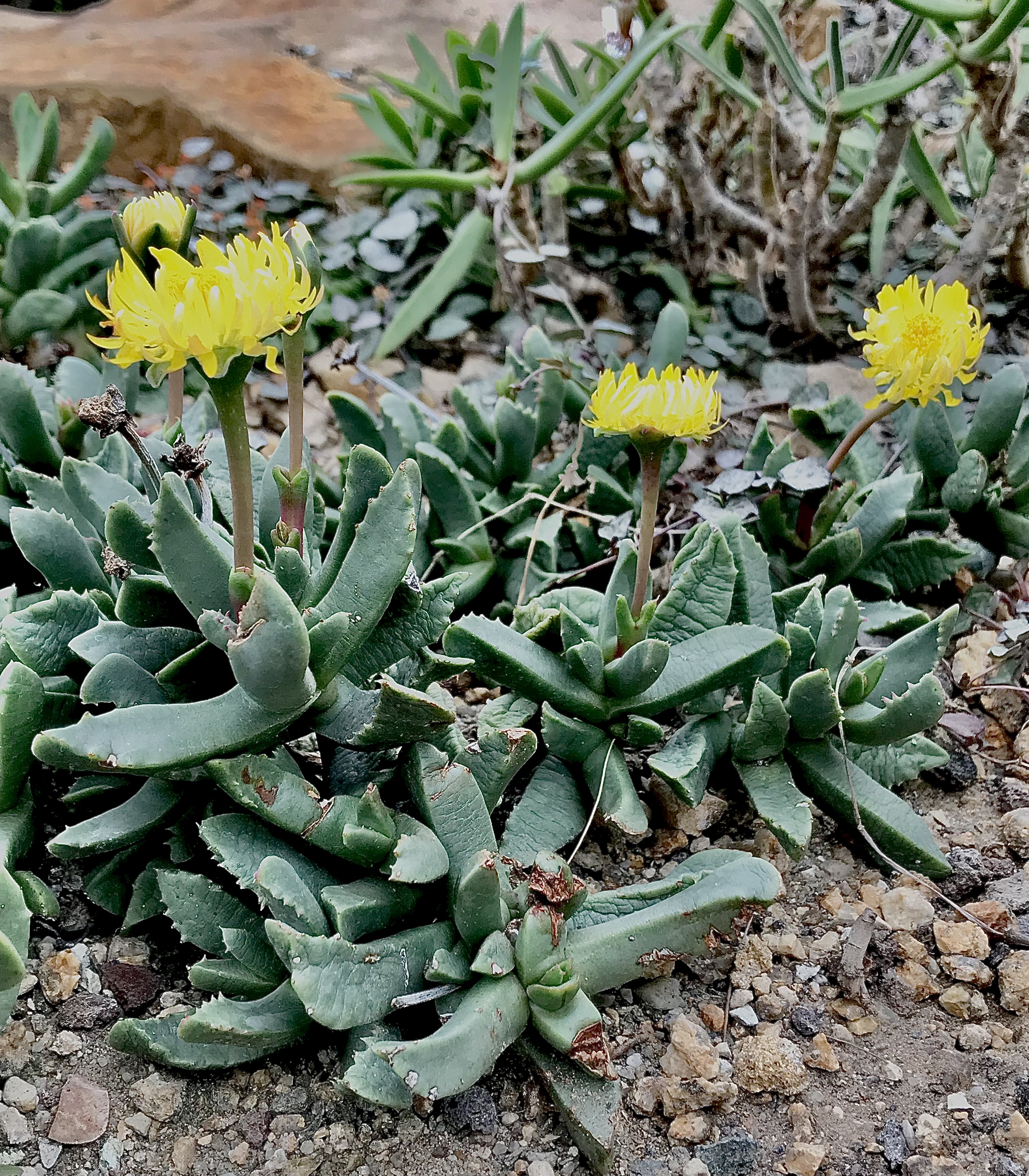
- Carruanthus ringens in bloom

Conservation status
- Least Concern (SANBI Red List)

Scientific classification
- Kingdom: Plantae
- Clade: Embryophytes
- Clade: Tracheophytes
- Clade: Spermatophytes
- Clade: Angiosperms
- Clade: Eudicots
- Order: Caryophyllales
- Family: Aizoaceae
- Genus: Carruanthus
- Species: C. ringens

Binomial name
- Carruanthus ringens (L.) Boom

Synonyms
- Bergeranthus caninus (Lam.) Schwantes; Carruanthus caninus (Lam.) Schwantes; Mesembryanthemum caninum Lam.; Mesembryanthemum ringens L. (1753); Mesembryanthemum vulpinum Haw.; Tischleria peersii Schwantes

= Carruanthus ringens =

Species of succulent

Carruanthus ringens (syn. Carruanthus caninus) is a species of flowering plant in family Aizoaceae, one of only two species belonging to the genus Carruanthus. It is a succulent subshrub native to the southern and south-central Western Cape Province of South Africa.

It has gained the Royal Horticultural Society's Award of Garden Merit.

Carruanthus ringens grows to a height of 20 cm. This succulent is drought tolerant and grows best in soils of pH 6 and 8. If kept completely dry it will withstand mild frost. Like a number of other plants belonging to the Aizoaceae, the species has flowers which bear a superficial similarity to those of dandelions (species in the unrelated genus Taraxacum of the Asteraceae).

The species was first described as Mesembryanthemum ringens by Carl Linnaeus in 1753. In 1959 Boudewijn Karel Boom placed the species in genus Carruanthus as C. ringens.

== Gallery ==
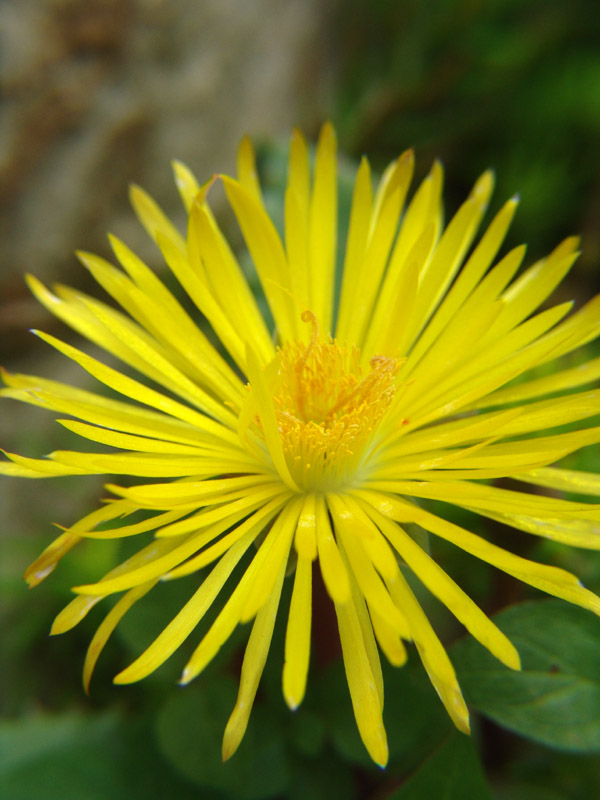
C. ringens single flower, viewed from above

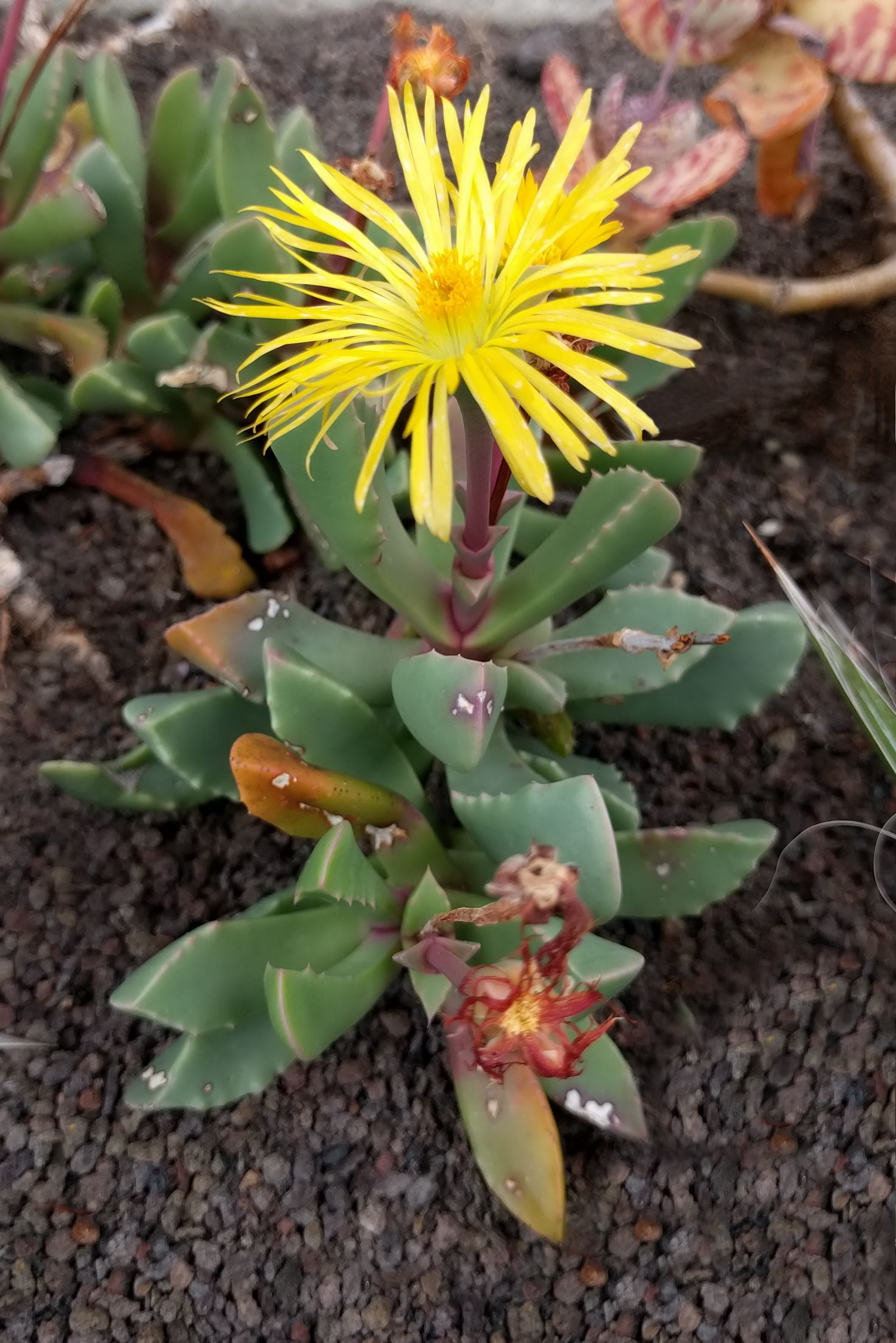
Plant in flower and fruit: note fig-like young fruit in foreground
