= Vibration Cooking =

Book by Vertamae Grosvenor

Vibration Cooking: Or, the Travel Notes of a Geechee Girl
- Cover from the first edition
- Author: Vertamae Smart-Grosvenor
- Language: English
- Subject: Soul food Gullah culture
- Genre: Cookbook
- Published: 1970 (Doubleday)
- Publication place: United States

Vibration Cooking: Or, the Travel Notes of a Geechee Girl is the 1970 debut book by Vertamae Smart-Grosvenor and combines recipes with storytelling. It was published by Doubleday. A second edition was published in 1986, and a third edition was published in 1992. The University of Georgia published another edition in 2011. Smart-Grosvenor went on to publish more cookbooks after Vibration Cooking. Vibration Cooking raised awareness about Gullah culture.

Scholar Anne E. Goldman compared Vibration Cooking with Jessica Harris' Iron Pots and Wooden Spoons, arguing that, in both books, "the model of the self... is historicized by being developed in the context of colonialism." Lewis V. Baldwin recommended Vibration Cooking for its "interesting and brilliant insights on the social significance of food and eating and their relationship to 'place' in a southern context." The book inspired filmmaker Julie Dash to make the film Daughters of the Dust, which won awards at the Sundance Film Festival.

== Bibliography ==
- Baldwin, Lewis V. (1991). There is a Balm in Gilead: The Cultural Roots of Martin Luther King, Jr. Augsburg Fortress. ISBN 1451412983.
- Edgar, Walter B. (2006). The South Carolina Encyclopedia. University of South Carolina Press. ISBN 1570035989.
- Goldman, Anne E. (1996). Take My Word: Autobiographical Innovations of Ethnic American Working Women. University of California Press. ISBN 0520916360.
- Witt, Doris (2001). Sherrie A. Inness (ed.). ""My Kitchen Was the World": Vertamae Smart Grosvenor's Geechee Diaspora". Kitchen Culture in America: Popular Representations of Food, Gender, and Race. University of Pennsylvania Press. ISBN 0812217357.
