= Baudoin =

Baudoin is a surname related to Baldwin. Notable people with the name include:

- Edmond Baudoin (born 1942), French artist, illustrator, and writer of sequential art and graphic novels
- Gervais Baudoin (1686–1752), Canadian surgeon
- Giuseppe Baudoin (1843–1896), Italian major
- Jean Baudoin (1662–1698), French missionary and chaplain
- Jean Baudoin (translator) (1590–1650), French translator
- Jean-Baptiste Baudoin (1831–1875), French Catholic priest and missionary in Iceland
- Louis Alexis Baudoin (1776–1805), French Navy officer and captain
- Magela Baudoin (born 1973), Bolivian author
- Mario Baudoin (1942–2019), Bolivian biologist

Notable people with Baudoin as a given name include:

- Baudoin Kanda (born 1993), Romanian footballer
- Baudoin Liwanga Mata (born 1950), Congolese military figure and politician

== See also ==
- Beaudoin
- Baudouin (disambiguation)
