= Passionately Human, No Less Divine =

2007 book by Wallace D. Best

Passionately Human, No Less Divine: Religion and Culture in Black Chicago, 1915–1952 is a non-fiction book by Wallace D. Best, published by Princeton University Press in 2007.

It discusses African-American Protestantism, in Bronzeville, Chicago during the stated period in its title, which coincides with the Great Migration.

Charles H. Long of University of California Santa Barbara wrote that the book "gives a religious interpretation of the Great Northern Migration or Southern Exodus itself."

== Reception ==
Anthea D. Butler, then of University of Rochester, wrote that the work "will prove to be, I hope, a pivotal text" in its field.

Barbara L. Green of Wright State University stated that it was an "important contribution" and "well-researched". She also stated that the information on how churches in shop space were created held interest for her.

Long stated that the work "is a very important study".
