= Carruanthus peersii =

Conservation status
- Least Concern (SANBI Red List)

Scientific classification
- Kingdom: Plantae
- Clade: Embryophytes
- Clade: Tracheophytes
- Clade: Spermatophytes
- Clade: Angiosperms
- Clade: Eudicots
- Order: Caryophyllales
- Family: Aizoaceae
- Genus: Carruanthus
- Species: C. peersii

Binomial name
- Carruanthus peersii L.Bolus

Species of succulent

Carruanthus peersii is a species of flowering plant in the ice plant family Aizoaceae. It is a succulent subshrub native to the Willowmore area of Eastern Cape Province in South Africa.

Carruanthus peersii has green toothed leaves and yellow flowers. The succulent is hardy down to -5 Celsius and can stand a variety of lighting conditions.
