= John Baldwin =

John Baldwin may refer to:

== Military ==
- Jack Baldwin (RAF officer) (John Eustice Arthur Baldwin, 1892–1975), senior British Royal Air Force officer
- John Robert Baldwin (1918–1952), RAF fighter ace of the Second World War
- John A. Baldwin Jr. (born 1933), American admiral

== Politics and government ==
- Sir John Baldwin (judge) (died 1545), Chief Justice of the Common Pleas, 1535–1545
- John Baldwin (congressman) (1772–1850), U.S. Representative from Connecticut
- John Brown Baldwin (1820–1873), Politician in Virginia during the American Civil War
- John Denison Baldwin (1809–1883), U.S. Representative from Massachusetts and writer on anthropology
- John Harvey Baldwin (1851–1924), American lawyer and politician
- John Baldwin (Missouri politician) (1843–1934), Missouri senator
- John F. Baldwin Jr. (1915–1966), U.S. Representative from California
- John Baldwin (MP) (died 1691), English politician
- John R. Baldwin (1854–1897), Massachusetts politician
- J. B. Munro (born John Munro, 1936–2018), New Zealand politician

== Sports ==
- John Baldwin Sr. (active 1972), American figure skater
- John Baldwin (boxer) (born 1949), American boxer
- John Baldwin (figure skater) (born 1973), American pairs figure skater with Rena Inoue

== Other people ==
- John Baldwin (educator) (1799–1884), founder of Baldwin-Wallace College, Baker University, Baldwin Boys High School and Baldwin Girls High School
- John Baldwin (trade unionist) (1923–2007), British trade unionist
- John Paul Jones (musician) (John Baldwin, born 1946), bassist and keyboard player for Led Zeppelin
- John Baldwyn (1438–1500) English composer.
- John Baldwin (1560–1615) English composer, tenor, gentleman of the Chapel Royal and copyist of the Baldwin Partbooks.
- John C. Baldwin (1948–2016), American cardiac surgeon and academic administrator
- John E. Baldwin (1931–2010), British astronomer
- John Loraine Baldwin (1809–1896), author on the games of whist and badminton
- John Thomas Baldwin (1910–1974), American botanist
- John W. Baldwin (1929–2015), historian, specialist of Philip II of France

== See also ==
- Jack Baldwin (disambiguation)
- Baldwin (name)
