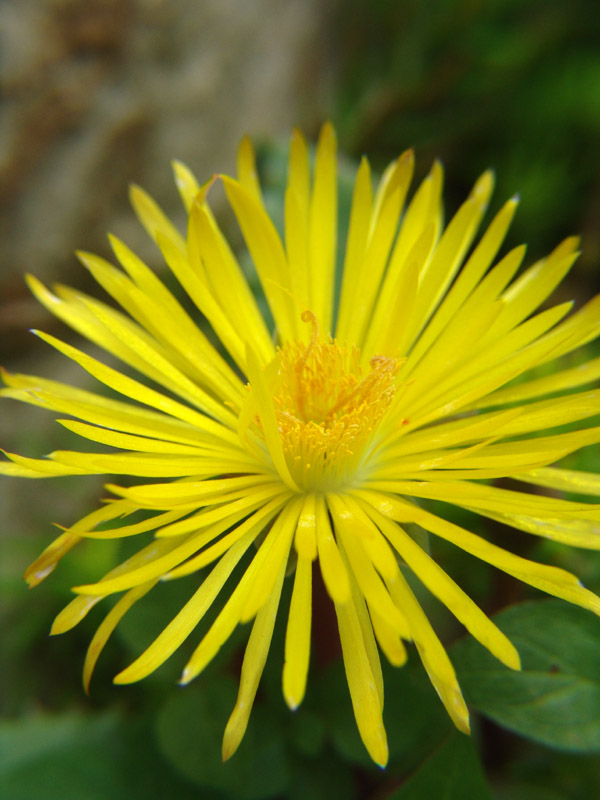
- Carruanthus ringens

Scientific classification
- Kingdom: Plantae
- Clade: Tracheophytes
- Clade: Angiosperms
- Clade: Eudicots
- Order: Caryophyllales
- Family: Aizoaceae
- Subfamily: Ruschioideae
- Tribe: Ruschieae
- Genus: Carruanthus (Schwantes) Schwantes

Synonyms
- Tischleria Schwantes

= Carruanthus =

Genus of succulents

Carruanthus is a genus of only two species of flowering plants belonging to the ice plant family, Aizoaceae. It is native to the south-central and southern Cape Provinces of South Africa.

Carruanthus ringens and Carruanthus peersi are species native to South Africa.

== Species ==
Two species are accepted.

- Carruanthus peersii L.Bolus
- Carruanthus ringens (L.) Boom

== Gallery ==
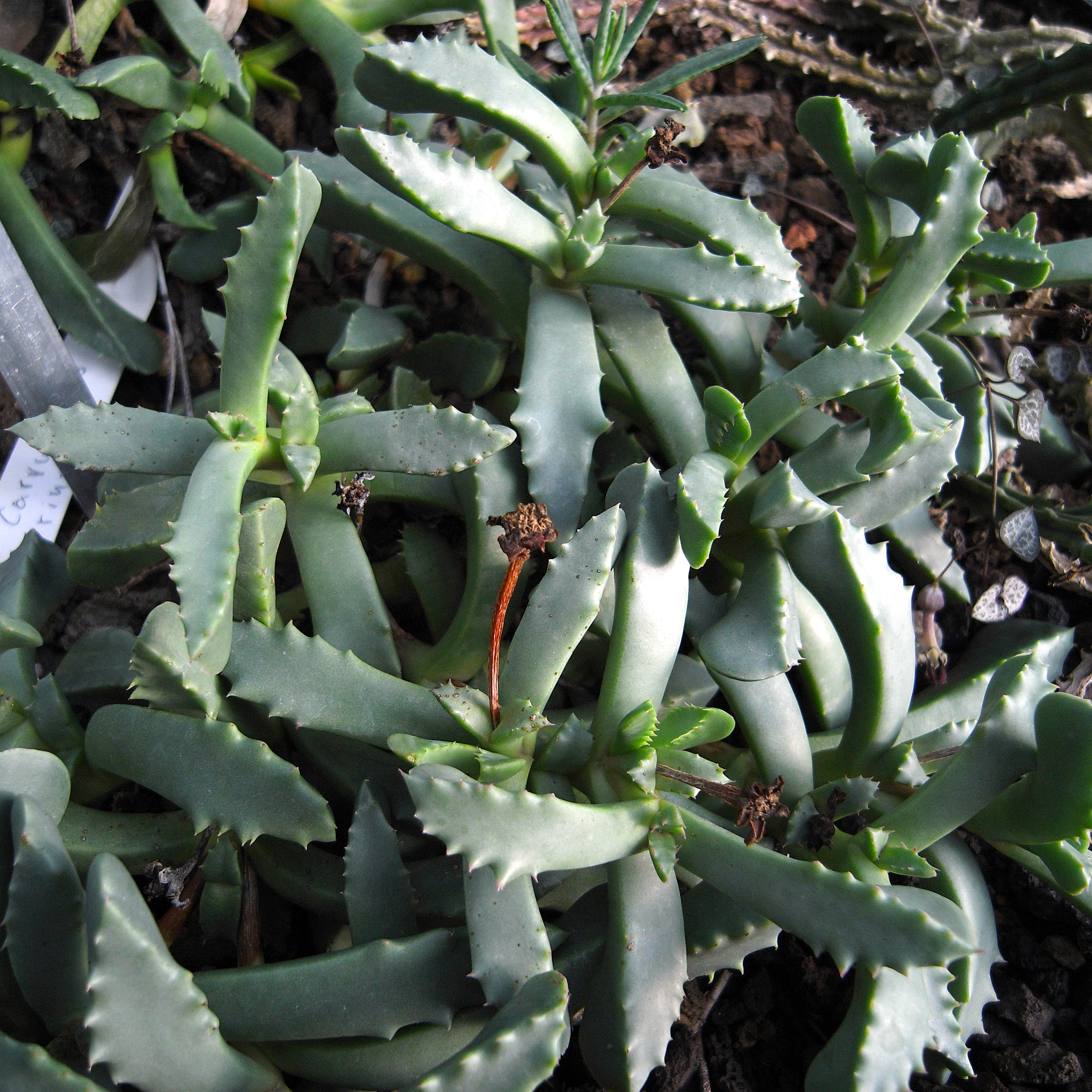
C. ringens foliage
