= White Evangelical Racism =

2021 book by Anthea Butler

- Author: Anthea Butler
- Genre: Non-fiction
- Publisher: University of North Carolina Press
- Publication date: 2021

White Evangelical Racism: The Politics of Morality in America is a 2021 book by Anthea Butler, a professor of religious studies and Africana studies at the University of Pennsylvania. A second edition was published in 2025. The book examines the historical and contemporary relationship between white American evangelicalism, racism, right-wing politics, and Christian nationalism.

Butler argues that white evangelicals have historically supported and maintained racial hierarchies, using moral and religious claims to justify them, from the 19th century through to the presidency of Donald Trump. She posits that the term "evangelical" has been co-opted to primarily denote a form of conservative, white, nationalist Protestantism rather than a purely theological tradition. According to Butler, modern evangelicalism functions more as a nationalistic political movement aimed at preserving the dominance of white Christian men, rather than focusing solely on spiritual or theological matters.
