= William Baldwin (disambiguation) =

William Baldwin (born 1963) is an American actor.

William Baldwin may also refer to:

- William Baldwin (author) (fl. 1547), English author of Beware the Cat, arguably the first novel in English
- William Baldwin (Jesuit) (1563–1632), English Jesuit
- William Warren Baldwin (1775–1844), Canadian politician
- William Baldwin (botanist) (1779–1819), American botanist and doctor
- William Edwin Baldwin (1827–1864), American Civil War Confederate army officer
- William Henry Baldwin (1827–1894), shipbuilder from Quebec
- William Baldwin (Maryland politician) (died 1895), American politician
- William Baldwin (New Zealand politician) (1838–1917), New Zealand politician
- William Delavan Baldwin (1856–1930), American chairman of Otis Elevator
- William Woodward Baldwin (1862–1954), U.S. Third Assistant Secretary of State
- William Henry Baldwin Jr. (1863–1905), American railroad executive of the Long Island Rail Road
- William E. Baldwin (politician) (born 1948), Pennsylvanian politician
- William Baldwin (journalist) (born 1951), American business journalist

== See also ==
- Billy Baldwin (disambiguation)
- William Bawdwen (1762–1816), English antiquary
