= Anthea Butler =

American professor of religion and writer

- Butler in 2022
- Born: 1960 (age 65–66); Texas, US
- Awards: Geraldine R. Segal Professor in American Social Thought

Academic background
- Education: University of Houston–Clear Lake (B.A.); Fuller Theological Seminary (M.A.); Vanderbilt University (M.A., PhD.)
- Thesis: A Peculiar Synergy: Matriarchy and the Church of God in Christ (2001)
- Doctoral advisor: Lewis V. Baldwin

Anthea Deidre Butler (born 1960) is an African-American professor of religion and chair of the University of Pennsylvania Department of Religious Studies, where she is the Geraldine R. Segal Professor in American Social Thought.

== Early life and education ==
Born in Texas in 1960, Anthea Deidre Butler is the daughter of Jesse and Willa Mae (Anthony) Butler. She attended La Marque High School in La Marque, Texas, winning prizes in local music contests playing the marimba.

She completed a B.A. degree at the University of Houston–Clear Lake; an M.A. in theology at the Fuller Theological Seminary in California; and an M.A. in religion at Vanderbilt University. She earned a Ph.D. in Religion at Vanderbilt University in 2001, with the dissertation, A Peculiar Synergy: Matriarchy and the Church of God in Christ, advised by Lewis V. Baldwin.

== Career ==
Butler was a Postdoctoral Fellow in Race, Religion, and Gender at Princeton University from 2001 to 2002. She has also been on the faculties of Loyola Marymount University and the University of Rochester in Rochester, New York. In 2008 and 2009, she was a research associate and Colorado Scholar in the Women’s Study in Religion Program of Harvard Divinity School. Since 2009 she has been on the faculty of the University of Pennsylvania, where she now serves as chair of the Department of Religious Studies. For the 2025–26 academic year, Butler held a senior fellowship at the Koch History Centre in the University of Oxford, with the theme of the centre's studies that year being 'religion and the state'.

She has taught classes on the religious beliefs of Malcolm X, and Martin Luther King and is known for her extensive use of social media and engagement in religious debates on Twitter. She has written for Religion Dispatches, TheGrio and CNN's Belief Blog.

== Views ==
As an educator, Butler was among those who protested against Colin Powell being awarded an honorary degree from the University of Rochester. She has also spoken on issues such as the sexuality of Pentecostal women, and has criticised the Evangelicalism of former Republican vice-presidential candidate Sarah Palin.

Butler has been critical of the American Christian right and Evangelicalism in general, arguing that it is white supremacist. Her 2021 book White Evangelical Racism: The Politics of Morality in America discusses White American Evangelicals and that group's support for former President Donald Trump and conservative Republicans, arguing that "evangelicalism is not a simply religious group at all" but a racist, "nationalistic political movement".

In 2015, in response to Republican presidential candidate Ben Carson's views on the modern display of the Confederate battle flag at NASCAR races, she argued that he deserved a "Coon of the Year" award on Twitter, leading to criticism among conservatives for her use of an anti-Black racial slur. Tommy Christopher of Mediaite defended her use of the word, arguing that the slur had different connotations when said by a Black person (such as Butler) than a White person.

== Personal life ==
Butler is Catholic, and for a period identified as an Evangelical.

== Selected publications ==
=== Books ===
- Butler, Anthea (2007). Women in the Church of God in Christ: Making a Sanctified World. University of North Carolina Press. ISBN 978-0-8078-5808-0.
- Butler, Anthea (2019). The Gospel According to Sarah: How Sarah Palin's Tea Party Angels Are Galvanizing the Religious Right. New Press. ISBN 9781595587107.
- Butler, Anthea (2021). White Evangelical Racism: The Politics of Morality in America. University of North Carolina Press. ISBN 978-1-4696-6117-9.

=== Articles ===
- Butler, Anthea D. "African American Religious Conservatives in the New Millennium." in Sutton, Matthew Avery. Faith in the New Millennium 2016: 59-73. ISBN 0199372705.
- Butler, A. D. " 'Only a Woman Would Do' Bible Reading and African American Women’s Organizing Work." Women and Religion in the African Diaspora: Knowledge, Power, and Performance, 155-178.
- Butler, A. D. (2001). Institutional authority vs. charismatic authority (pp. 100–114).
- Butler, A. D. (2007). Unrespectable Saints: Women of the Church of God in Christ.
- Butler, A. D., Walton, J. L., Neal, R. B., Hart, W. D., Sorett, J., Blum, E., & Glaude Jr, E. S. (2010). The Black Church is Dead—Long Live the Black Church. Religion Dispatches.

== Awards and honors ==
In 2021, Butler was named the Geraldine R. Segal Professor in American Social Thought, a professorship "...interdisciplinary in nature and awarded to a scholar of national reputation whose central interests include human rights, civil liberties, and race relations."

Butler was a Yale University Presidential Visiting Fellow for 2019-20, "to investigate the prosperity gospel and its political dimensions in the American and Nigerian contexts".
