= Billy Baldwin =

Billy, William, or Bill Baldwin may refer to:

- Billy Baldwin (decorator) (1903–1983), New York decorator
- Bill Baldwin (footballer) (1907–1982), English footballer/soccer player
- Bill Baldwin (1935–2015), American science fiction author
- Billy Baldwin (baseball) (1951–2011), Major League Baseball outfielder
- William Baldwin (born 1963), American actor

== See also ==
- William Baldwin (disambiguation)
