= William H. Bledsoe =

American politician (1869–1936)

William Harrison Bledsoe

Member of the Texas House of Representatives from the 122nd district
- In office October 9, 1915 – July 17, 1919
- Preceded by: Don H. Biggers
- Succeeded by: Roy Alvin Baldwin

Member of the Texas Senate from the 29th district
- In office July 17, 1919 – January 13, 1925
- Preceded by: William S. Bell
- Succeeded by: Benjamin Franklin Berkeley

Member of the Texas Senate from the 30th district
- In office July 13, 1925 – January 8, 1929
- Preceded by: Robert A. Stuart
- Succeeded by: Pink L. Parrish

President pro tempore of the Texas Senate
- In office 1925–1927
- Preceded by: Alvin J. Wirtz
- Succeeded by: James G. Strong

Personal details
- Born: December 23, 1869 Cleburne, Cleburne County, Texas, U.S.
- Died: March 30, 1936 (aged 66)
- Resting place: Lubbock City Cemetery
- Party: Democratic
- Spouse: Married (name of spouse missing)
- Parent(s): Willis Scott and Susan Frances Harrison Bledsoe
- Education: University of Texas; Self-educated in the law
- Occupation: Lawyer; businessman

William Harrison Bledsoe (December 23, 1869 – March 30, 1936), was a Texas attorney who served in the Texas House of Representatives and the Texas Senate. During the latter service, he helped enact legislation creating Texas Tech University.

Political offices
Preceded by Don H. Biggers	Texas State Representative for District 122 (Andrews, Borden, Briscoe, Cochran, Crosby, Dawson, Gaines, Garza, Hockley, Lubbock, Lynn, Terry, and Yoakum counties); 1915–1919	Succeeded by Roy Alvin Baldwin
Preceded by William S. Bell	Texas State Senator for District 29 (Archer, Armstrong, Bailey, Baylor, Briscoe, Carson, Castro, Childress, Clay, Cochran, Collingsworth, Cottle, Crosby, Dallam, Deaf Smith, Dickens, Donley, Floyd, Foard, Gray, Hale, Hall, Hansford, Hardeman, Hartley, Hemphill, Hockley, Hutchinson, Jack, King, Knox, Lamb, Lipscomb, Lubbock, Moore, Motley, Ochiltree, Oldham, Parmer, Potter, Randall, Roberts, Sherman, Swisher, Throckmorton, Wheeler, Wichita, Wilbarger, and Young counties); 1919–1925	Succeeded by Benjamin Franklin Berkeley
Preceded by Robert A. Stuart	Texas State Senator for District 30 (Andrews, Bailey, Borden, Cochran, Cottle, Crosby, Dawson, Dickens, Floyd, Gaines, Garza, Hale, Hockley, Howard, Kent, King, Lamb, Lubbock, Lynn, Martin, Motley, Stonewall, Terry, and Yoakum counties); 1925–1929	Succeeded by Pink L. Parrish
Preceded by Alvin J. Wirtz	Texas Senate President pro tempore 1925–1927	Succeeded by James G. Strong
