= Peter Baldwin =

Peter Baldwin may refer to:

- Peter Baldwin (actor) (1933–2015), English actor
- Peter Baldwin (director) (1931–2017), American television director
- Peter Baldwin (politician) (born 1951), Australian politician
- Peter Baldwin (professor) (born 1956), American historian
- Peter Baldwin (footballer) (born 1968), Australian rules footballer
- Peter Baldwin (civil servant) (1922–2010), British civil servant
