= James Baldwin (disambiguation) =

James Baldwin (1924–1987) was an American novelist, essayist and civil rights activist.

James Baldwin may also refer to:

== Public officials ==
- James Fowle Baldwin (1782–1862), American civil engineer, surveyor and Massachusetts senator
- James Baldwin (Los Angeles pioneer) (before 1830—after 1860), American member of Common Council
- James H. Baldwin (1876–1944), American federal district judge in Montana
- James N. Baldwin, American state official in New York, Excelsior College president 2016–2020

== Sportsmen ==
- James A. Baldwin (1886–1964), American football coach
- Jimmy Baldwin (1922–1985), English footballer
- James Baldwin (baseball) (born 1971), American right-handed pitcher
- James Baldwin (racing driver) (born 1997), British racing driver
- James Baldwin (tennis) (1858–1934), British tennis player

== Writers ==
- James Baldwin (educator) (1841–1925), American educator, editor and author
- James Mark Baldwin (1861–1934), American philosopher and psychologist
- James Baldwin (1924–1987), American writer and activist
- James T. Baldwin (1933–2018), American industrial designer and writer

== Others ==
- James J. Baldwin (1888–1955), American architect
- James L. Baldwin (1921–1979), American major general

== Fictional characters ==
- Jamie Baldwin, played by Rupert Hill on British soap opera Coronation Street

== See also ==
- Baldwin (disambiguation)
