= Harry Baldwin =

Harry Baldwin may refer to:

- Harry Baldwin (cricketer) (1860–1935), English cricketer and umpire
- Harry Streett Baldwin (1894–1952), U.S. Congressman
- Harry Baldwin (baseball) (1900–1958), American baseball player
- Harry Baldwin (footballer) (1920–2010), English football goalkeeper

== See also ==
- Henry Baldwin (disambiguation)
