= David Baldwin =

David Baldwin may refer to:

- David Baldwin (fl. 1830s–1870s), American inventor; owner of David Baldwin House, Midland Park, New Jersey
- David Dwight Baldwin (1831–1912), Hawaiian businessman, educator, and biologist
- David Baldwin (bowls) (1921–2012), New Zealand bowls player
- Dave Baldwin (baseball) (born 1938), American baseball player
- Dave Baldwin (American football) (born 1955), American football coach
- David Baldwin (historian) (1946–2016), British historian and writer
- David S. Baldwin, California Adjutant General
- David Baldwin (executive), English football executive
