= Joseph Baldwin (disambiguation) =

Joseph Baldwin (1827–1899) was an American educationist, "father of the normal school system".

Joseph Baldwin may also refer to:

- Joseph G. Baldwin (1815–1864), American writer and California Supreme Court Justice
- Joseph M. Baldwin (1878–1945), Australian, Victorian government astronomer 1920–1943
- Joseph C. Baldwin (1897–1957), American Republican congressman for New York
- Joseph Baldwin (footballer), English footballer
- Joseph Baldwin (actor), American actor known for portraying "Byder" in Code Name: Eternity

== See also ==
- Joseph Baldwin Academy, Missouri
