= Gervais Baudouin =

Gervais Baudouin (c. 1645 – 1700) was a surgeon born in France who came to New France about 1677.

Baudouin's practice in Quebec consisted of being the doctor to the local Ursulines as well as the seminary of Quebec. In 1695, he was appointed surgeon-major of Quebec, a position he held until his death because of an epidemic. He was survived by his wife and eight children. Three daughters became nuns and one son, Michel, became a Jesuit priest. Another son, Gervais, became a surgeon.
