= Greg A. Baldwin =

American litigation attorney (born 1946)

- Born: November 14, 1946; Boston
- Alma mater: Boston College; Cornell Law School
- Occupation: Lawyer

Greg A. Baldwin (born November 14, 1946, in Boston, Massachusetts) is a litigation attorney and partner, now retired, for the Florida law firm Holland & Knight. Baldwin has been admitted to practice law in the jurisdictions of the District of Columbia, New York, and Florida. He has been a member of the Miami Dade County Bar Association and the American Bar Association's Task Force on the Gatekeeper Initiative to combat money-laundering and terrorist financing. He is known for his work on anti-money laundering and on criminal and regulatory compliance. In 2014, he was internationally listed as a top lawyer in the area of commercial litigation and white-collar crime.

Baldwin is active in gay and lesbian politics and in HIV/AIDS healthcare and support initiatives, and was once described as "the public face of gay South Florida". He has chaired the Dade Action PAC, using traditional means to lobby for equal rights in housing, health, and treatment by government, police, and the public. In the 1990s, Baldwin was involved in successful initiatives including the introduction of sensitivity training for Miami police officers and the passage of a state amendment to hate crimes legislation that recognized hate crimes based on sexual orientation.

Baldwin served in the Vietnam War and was awarded an Army Commendation Medal, a Bronze Star and a Purple Heart.

== Early life and education ==
Gregory Alan Baldwin was born on November 14, 1946, in Boston, Massachusetts and grew up in Lexington. He attended St. Agnes School in Arlington, Massachusetts, Rose Hawthorne Catholic School and Boston College High School (1960-1964).

Baldwin attended Boston College, and graduated with a degree in economics cum laude in 1968. He was accepted into law school, but enlisted in the army and went through officer training and deployment in Vietnam before beginning his degree. Baldwin served in the Vietnam War as an infantry platoon leader in 1970. He earned an Army Commendation Medal, a Bronze Star and a Purple Heart. After being invalided out, Baldwin entered Cornell Law School, graduating in 1974.

== Career ==
External videos
- Greg Baldwin: Oral History, Vizcaya Museum & Gardens

From 1974 until 1980, Baldwin worked at the U.S. Department of Justice, dealing with organized crime. From 1980 to 1982, Baldwin worked on the Senate Subcommittee on Investigation, serving under Georgia Democratic senator Sam Nunn. Coming out as homosexual marked the end of both Baldwin's job and his marriage. After Baldwin came out in December 1981, Nunn expressed concern that Baldwin would be seen as a potential security risk. Baldwin moved to Miami in 1982, where he worked with the U.S. Attorney's Office.

In 1986, Baldwin joined Holland & Knight, Florida's largest locally-based law firm. Baldwin raised the question of whether the firm covered same-sex domestic partner health insurance, spurring a policy change at Holland & Knight. The firm began to offer health insurance for gay employees' domestic partners and dependents. At the time gay employees did not have the legal right to marry: they were asked to submit an affidavit indicating that they were in a committed relationship. Baldwin became a partner in the firm in 1988.

Baldwin was active in gay and lesbian politics and in HIV/AIDS healthcare and support initiatives. He helped to organize the Miami's Health Crisis Network, serving on its board of directors. He was a co-founder of Body Positive and Home of Peace Enterprises, Inc. (HOPE). Openly gay when many were afraid to be "out", he was once described as "the public face of gay South Florida".

Baldwin helped to organize the Dade Action PAC (a precursor to SAVE Action PAC), which registered with the state of Florida in 1990. Baldwin served as chair for 1990–1991, and was succeeded by Robin A. Buhrke. The Action Pac communicated with possible candidates directly and through its endorsement questionnaires, and endorsed them based on their positions and their impact in the gay community. Two initial goals of the Action PAC were amending the hate-crimes act to include sexual orientation, and opposing any attempt at mandatory reporting of HIV status. The Hate Crimes Amendment was successfully passed. making monitoring of anti-gay hate crimes possible. While Florida is still believed to be marked by a significant under-reporting of hate crimes, data from the Florida Attorney General indicates that 22 percent of hate crimes in Florida are based on sexual orientation, making the LGBTQ community the most at risk community in Florida given their incidence in the population.

Baldwin is known for his legal work related to organized crime, money laundering and regulatory compliance. He is credited with coining the term "smurfing" as it applies to financial crime. Federal law required the reporting of cash transactions over a specified limit to the IRS as of 1970. Drug dealers and others attempting to evade the regulation started using individual depositors to move money by making smaller repeat transactions. Baldwin reportedly compared them to The Smurfs, tiny blue comic characters who work together against their adversary, the wizard Gargamel. A 1986 statute criminalized this type of financial structuring in the United States. In 2014, Baldwin was recognized as a top lawyer internationally in the areas of commercial litigation and white-collar crime.

Baldwin retired from active litigation as of January 2023. His final case at Holland & Knight was Architectural Ingenieria Siglo XXI LLC. v. Dominican Republic, Instituto Nacional De Recursos Hidraulicos, in which he and two other partners, Eduardo Ramos and Ilene Pabian, successfully represented the Dominican Republic and its water resource agency, Instituto Nacional De Recursos Hidraulicos, in a ten-year battle against two South Florida-based companies, Sun Land and AIS.
