= George Colfax Baldwin =

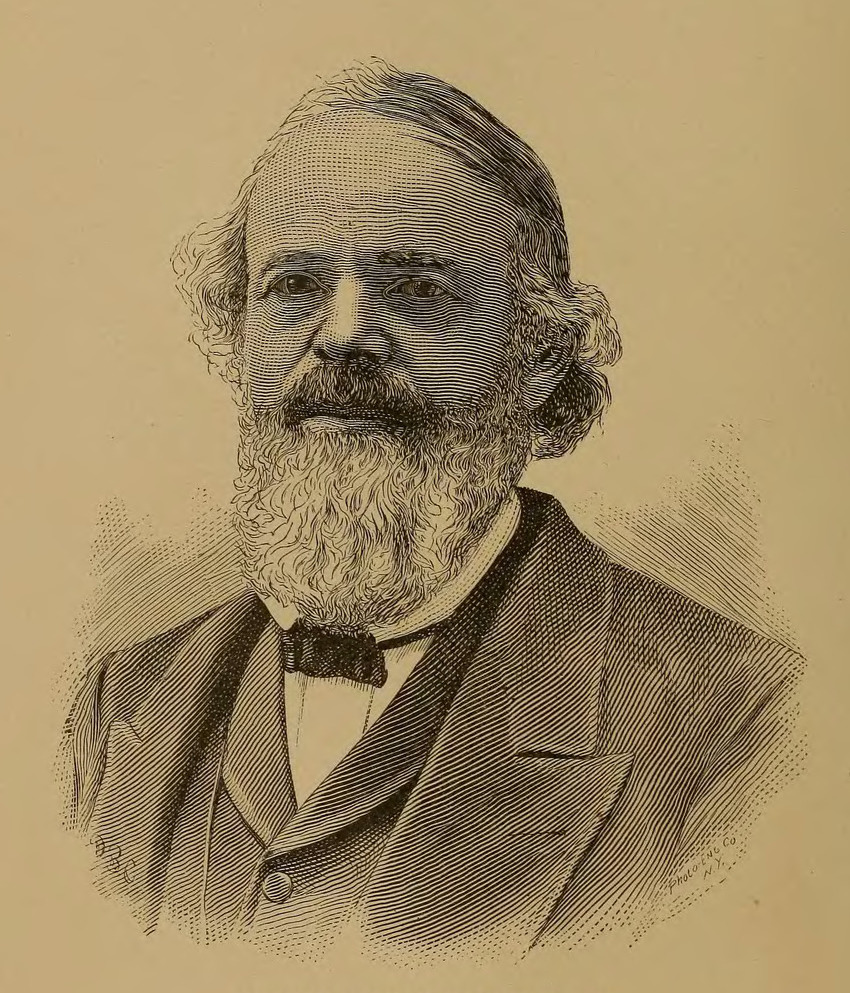
- Born: October 21, 1817; Pompton Township
- Died: November 29, 1899 (aged 82); Troy

George Colfax Baldwin (October 21, 1817 – November 29, 1899) was an American Baptist clergyman.

George Colfax Baldwin was born on October 21, 1817 in Pompton Township, New Jersey. He graduated from Madison University, Hamilton, New York, and was for many years pastor of the First Baptist Church in Troy, New York. He was author of Representative Women of the Bible (New York, 1855), Representative Men of the New Testament (1859), and The Model Prayer, a volume of lectures (Boston, 1870), and other works. George Colfax Baldwin died on 29 November 1899 in Troy.
