= Manuel Achille Baudouin =

Manuel Achille Baudouin (1846 – 24 January 1917) was a French judge.

Baudouin was appointed as an Advocate-General at Lyon in 1880, Procurator-General at Limoges in 1885, Advocate-General of the Court of Cassation at Paris in 1890.

In 1893 he was appointed President of the Civil Tribunal in this court, and was Procurator-General during the 1899 reopening of the Dreyfus case. In 1911, he was appointed Chief President of the Court of Cassation, a post he held until his death.
