= Michel Baudouin =

Michel Baudouin (Baudoin), (16 March 1691 – 1768), a Jesuit missionary, was born at Quebec and was the brother of Gervais Baudoin and son of Gervais Baudouin.

Michel began his Jesuit noviciate at Bordeaux, France in 1713 and previous to that had completed his college and philosophy studies, probably in Canada. By 1715 he was teaching and was ordained a priest in 1725. In 1728 he was posted to the missions in Louisiana.

In Louisiana, Baudouin was assigned to the Choctaw Mission, where he remained for eighteen years. From 1749 until 1763, he was Superior-General of the Louisiana mission. At that time the expulsion of the Jesuits was taking place in that area but the priest was allowed to remain. He retired and died in New Orleans. According to sources, he was a dedicated priest and gentle man who served his country, his faith, and the people to whom he ministered.
