= Gervais Baudoin =

Gervais Baudoin (3 August 1686 – 30 June 1752) was born in New France, the son of Gervais Baudouin, a surgeon-major of Quebec. He decided to pursue the medical profession and became a surgeon.

Baudoin studied at the seminary of Quebec and then studied and practiced surgery. At one point in his career, he attempted to obtain his father's position as surgeon-major of Quebec but was unsuccessful. It appears that he applied himself almost exclusively to his profession after that point. He had a large family and had four children who entered religious orders as had his brother, Michel Baudouin, who was a Jesuit missionary.
