= Dwight Baldwin =

Dwight Baldwin may refer to:

- Dwight Hamilton Baldwin (1821–1899), American piano manufacturer
- Dwight Baldwin (missionary) (1798–1886), American Christian missionary and physician on Maui
- David Dwight Baldwin (1831–1912), Hawaiian educator on Maui known as D. Dwight Baldwin
