= Baldwin VI =

Baldwin VI may refer to:

- Baldwin VI, Count of Flanders (c. 1030–1070)
- Baldwin I of Constantinople, also Baldwin VI of Hainaut (1172–c. 1205)
