= Peter Baldwin (civil servant) =

Civil servant

Sir Peter Robert Baldwin, KCB (10 November 1922 – 9 May 2010) was a British civil servant.

== Biography ==
Born in Kent on 10 November 1922, the son of an insurance surveyor, Baldwin attended the City of London School and Corpus Christi College, Oxford, and spent the Second World War on intelligence work; he trained at the Government Code and Cypher School and then worked at Bletchley Park to decipher Japanese diplomatic codes. His contemporaries included Roy Jenkins. After finishing his studies at Oxford on demobilisation, he entered HM Civil Service in 1948 as an official in the General Register Office, working on the 1951 census. He moved to HM Treasury in 1954 and was principal private secretary to the Chancellor of the Exchequer from 1966 to 1968, when he was appointed to under-secretary.

After a promotion to deputy secretary in 1972, he was briefly Second Permanent Secretary in the Department of the Environment in 1976 before being appointed Permanent Secretary at the Department for Transport later that year. He served in the latter office until 1982 and overseeing an overhaul of transport policy and the use of private money to supplement public funds in the provision of roads. Under the Thatcher government, he oversaw privatisations, and improvements to the accessibility of public transport for disabled people. After retiring in 1982, he was chair of the South-East Thames Regional Health Authority from 1983 to 1991 and then chairman of the delegates of the King's College Hospital Medical School until 1998. He also chaired several disability charities. He died on 9 May 2010.
