= George Baldwin (cricketer) =

English cricketer (1878–1970)

Personal information
- Full name: George Frederick Baldwin
- Born: 3 April 1878; Northampton, Northamptonshire, England
- Died: 15 May 1970 (aged 92); Burton upon Trent, Staffordshire, England
- Batting: Unknown
- Bowling: Unknown

Domestic team information
- Years: Team
- 1906: Northamptonshire

Career statistics
| Competition | First-class |
|---|---|
| Matches | 1 |
| Runs scored | 6 |
| Batting average | 6.00 |
| 100s/50s | –/– |
| Top score | 6 |
| Balls bowled | 48 |
| Wickets | – |
| Bowling average | – |
| 5 wickets in innings | – |
| 10 wickets in match | – |
| Best bowling | – |
| Catches/stumpings | –/– |
- Source: Cricinfo, 17 November 2011

George Frederick Baldwin (3 April 1878 – 15 May 1970) was an English cricketer. Baldwin's batting and bowling styles are unknown. He was born at Northampton, Northamptonshire.

Baldwin made a single first-class appearance for Northamptonshire against Leicestershire in the 1906 County Championship. He batted once in this match, scoring 6 runs before being dismissed by William Odell. With the ball he bowled 8 wicketless overs.

He died at Burton upon Trent, Staffordshire on 15 May 1970.
