= James N. Baldwin =

American attorney and administrator

James Baldwin

3rd President of Excelsior College
- Incumbent
- Assumed office October 2016

Personal details
- Education: Union College (BA); Albany Law School (JD)

James N. Baldwin is an American attorney and academic administrator who has served as the third President of Excelsior College since October 2016.

== Education ==
Baldwin earned a Bachelor of Arts in political science from Union College and a Juris Doctor from Albany Law School.

== Career ==
After graduating from law school, Baldwin was admitted to the New York State Bar Association. Baldwin served as CEO and superintendent of Questar III BOCES, an organization that provides educational and administrative services to three counties in New York. Baldwin also served as chief of staff and acting deputy commissioner for higher education in the New York State Education Department and deputy executive Secretary of State of New York. Baldwin joined Excelsior College in 2014 as the school's executive vice president. He was selected to serve as president in October 2016. Baldwin is scheduled to retire on July 31, 2020, and will be succeeded by David Schejbal.
