= Kathleen Baldwin =

American writer

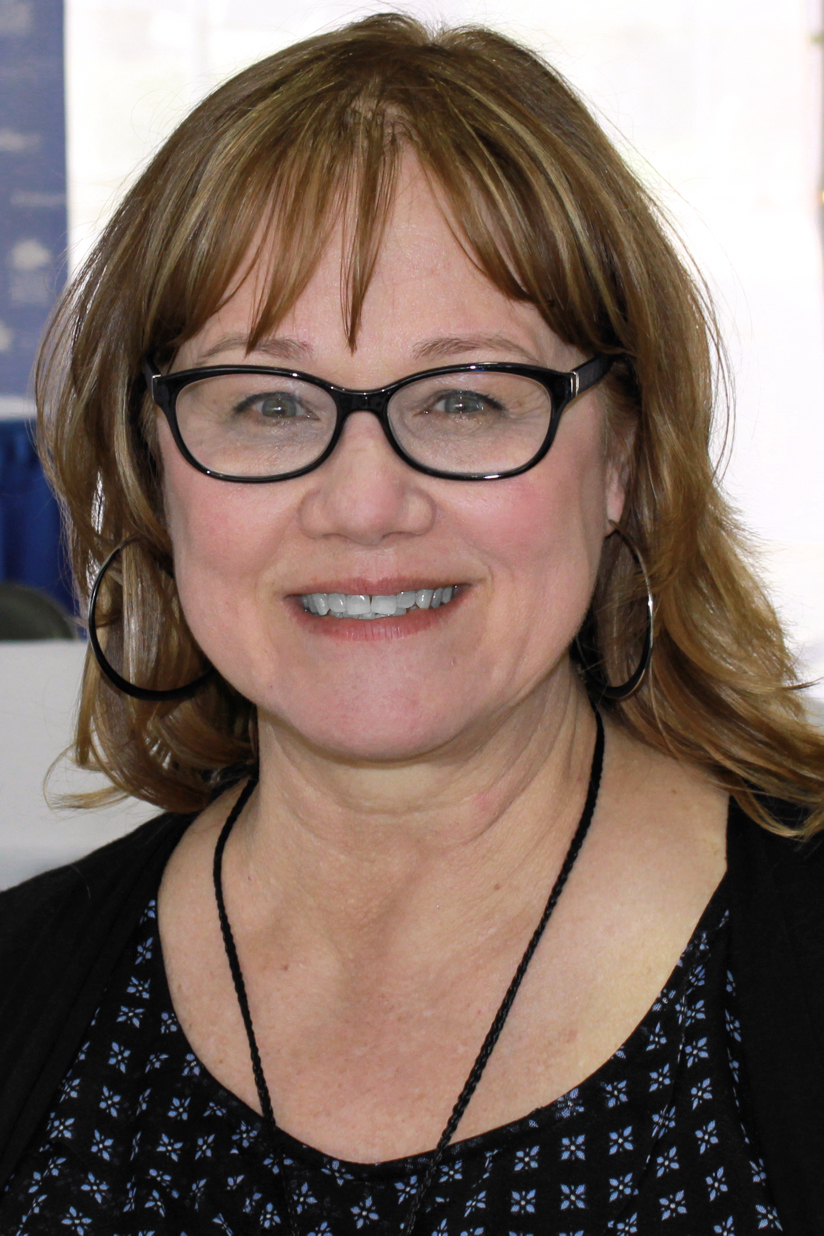
- Kathleen Baldwin at the 2015 Texas Book Festival.
- Born: Arizona, U.S.
- Occupation: Novelist
- Writing career
- Period: 2003–present
- Genre: Romance

Kathleen Baldwin (born Arizona, USA) is an American writer of comic romance novels set in the Regency period.

== Biography ==
Award-winning author Kathleen Baldwin was born and raised in Arizona, and moved 14 times before high school. The constant moving allowed her to meet many different people from many different backgrounds and areas. She gained a love of reading from her mother, who often read her poems and classic stories before bedtime. Her grandmothers, great-grandmothers, and great-aunts frequently related stories as well, so that a young Baldwin believed that women in general were supposed to tell stories. A voracious reader, Baldwin read at a level beyond her years, and was often excused from English classes to read on her own or to write down her own stories.

After earning a BA in Art and Design, Baldwin worked as a freelance artist for several years, designing models for toys while raising her children. During her early years of writing, Baldwin was able to have some of her nonfiction and poetry published, but continually received rejection notices for her fiction submissions. She quit her freelance work to concentrate on her writing and joined the Romance Writers of America. Finally, after 63 rejection notices, Baldwin found a receptive editor at Kensington Books who purchased her novel, Lady Fiasco, a "Regency Romantic Comedy". The editor requested several more novels, and Baldwin was given a deadline of less than a year to complete two more novels and a novella.

Baldwin is married. She and her husband, Brett, have four children, three boys and a girl. She and her family live in Texas. From 2011– 2012 Kathleen served as President-Elect and President of Dallas Area Romance Authors.

== Bibliography ==
=== Single novels ===
- Diary of a Teenage Fairy Godmother (2013)

=== The Wise Woman Choronicles ===
- The Last Wise Woman

=== My Notorious Aunt ===
- Lady Fiasco (2003)
- Mistaken Kiss (2004)
- Cut From the Same Cloth (2004)
- The Persuasion of Miss Kate

=== Stranje House ===
1. A School for Unusual Girls (2015)
2. Exile for Dreamers (2016)
3. Refuge for Masterminds (2017)
4. Harbor for the nightingale (2019)
5. Sanctuary for Seers (2023)

=== Omnibus in collaboration ===
- Waltz With a Rogue (2004) (with Mona Gedney and Lisa Noeli)
