= Agnes Baldwin =

Agnes Baldwin may refer to:

- Agnes Baldwin Alexander (1875–1971), American author
- Agnes Baldwin Brett (1876–1955), American numismatist and archaeologist
- Agnes Baldwin Webb (1926–2001), American basketball player
