= Henry Baldwin =

Henry Baldwin may refer to:

- Henry P. Baldwin (1814–1892), U.S. senator from Michigan
- Henry Baldwin (judge) (1780–1844), U.S. congressman from Pennsylvania and associate justice of the Supreme Court
- Henry Alexander Baldwin (1871–1946), businessman and U.S. congressman from Hawaii known as "Harry"
- Henry Baldwin (baseball) (1894–1964), American baseball player
- Henry Perrine Baldwin (1842–1911), co-founder of Alexander & Baldwin, father of Harry
- Henry Baldwin (mayor) (1856–1928), New Zealand businessman and politician, mayor of Lower Hutt

== See also ==
- Henry Baldwin Harrison (1821–1901), Republican politician and Governor
- Henry Baldwin Hyde (1834–1899), American businessman
- Harry Baldwin (disambiguation)
