= JBA Motors =

UK business

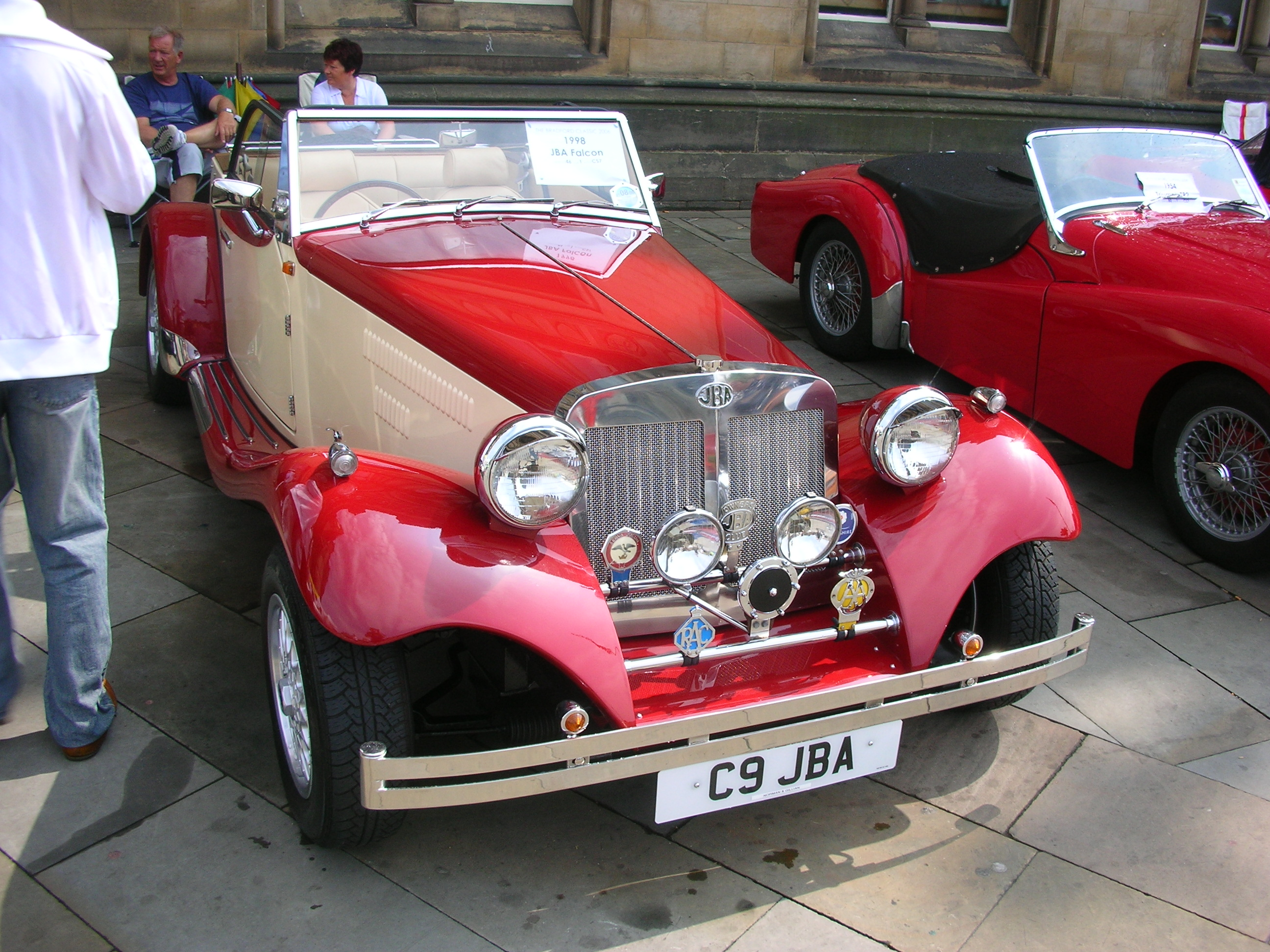
1998 JBA Falcon

JBA Motors was a company based in Norwich, Norfolk that made the JBA Falcon. The company was originally named JBA Engineering and the name came from the first letter of the surnames of the three partners who founded the firm, Kenneth Glyn Jones, John Barlow and David George Ashley. They were all engineers at British Leyland. John Barlow later left the company, but it was run by Ken Jones and Dave Ashley until 2004.

The Roadster went into production in 1982 (However, cars with model years as early as 1979 exist). In 1985 the JBA Javelin was introduced and the Falcon range was expanded with the JBA Falcon Plus Two. In 1988 the Falcon Roadster was replaced by the Falcon Sports. In 1990 the Falcon range was expanded with the Falcon Tourer that replaced the Falcon 2+2. In 1991 the JBA Falcon Sports SR, the first JBA car to 7 Ford Sierra as donor, was introduced. In 1994 the Falcon Tourer was replaced with Falcon TSR using Sierra parts.

Until end of July 2004 the company was run by Ken Jones and Dave Ashley and based in Standish, Greater Manchester. Tim Banwell bought the factory on 1 August 2004. In 2006 he announced that the company was for sale. In 2007 JBA Engineering went into administration.

== Models ==
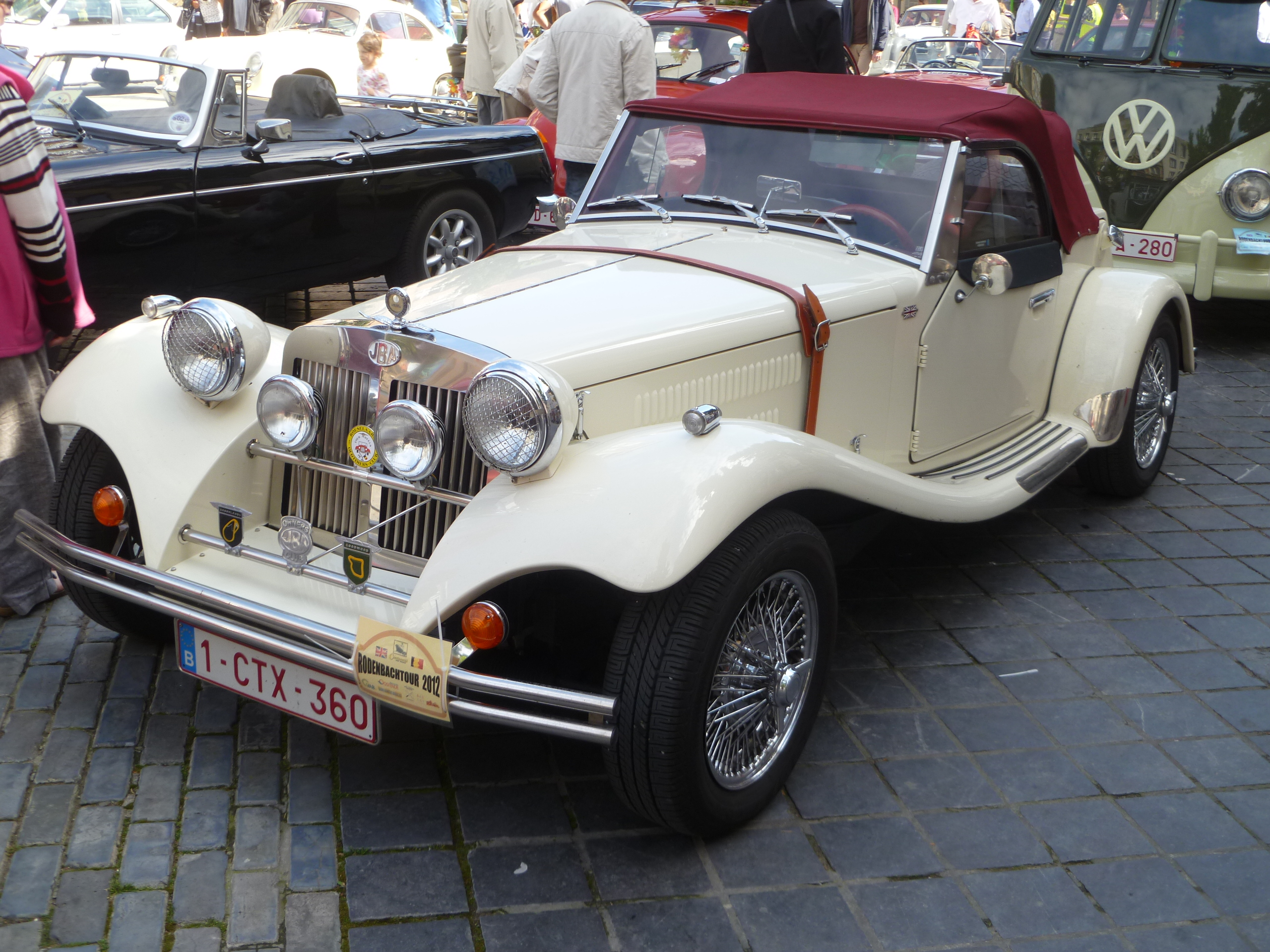
JBA Falcon TSR

=== JBA Sports SRi ===
The SRI is a two-seater sports car in the traditional British pre-World War II style. It uses Ford Sierra mechanical parts.

=== JBA Falcon TSR ===
The Falcon is a four-seater version of the SRI. The rear seat can be used for children up to about eight years old. It also is based on the Ford Sierra.

=== JBA Javelin ===
The Javelin came into existence in 1985, and was an attempt to create a more up to date looking car. The car was an open four seater with roof panels that were removable at the front and a foldable hood at the rear. It was based on the Ford Capri. In 1985, the kit cost £2,290. The Javelin disappeared again in 1989.

== See also ==
- List of car manufacturers of the United Kingdom
