= Charles Baldwin (cricketer) =

English cricketer

Personal information
- Born: 29 December 1864; Bury St Edmunds, Suffolk, England
- Died: 2 May 1947 (aged 82); Tylers Green, Buckinghamshire, England
- Batting: Right-handed
- Bowling: Medium

Domestic team information
- Years: Team
- 1892–1898: Surrey
- 1904: Suffolk

Career statistics
Competition	First-class
Matches	80
Runs scored	2,757
Batting average	24.18
100s/50s	3/10
Top score	234
Balls bowled	135
Wickets	0
Bowling average	–
5 wickets in innings	–
10 wickets in match	–
Best bowling	–
Catches/stumpings	55/–
- Source: Cricinfo, 11 July 2023

Charles Baldwin (29 December 1864 – 2 May 1947) was an English cricketer. He played 80 first-class matches for Surrey between 1892 and 1898. In 1897 he scored 234 against Kent. According to his obituary in Wisden, he was short and thickset, and a stylish batsman, who scored 1,137 runs in the County Championship in his best season of 1897. During his playing career with Surrey, he was known to umpire in first-class matches, doing so on three occasions; he would later umpire in a further three first-class matches following the end of his playing career with Surrey. He played minor counties cricket for his home county, Suffolk, in the 1904 Minor Counties Championship, making two appearances. After his playing career, he was a successful coach at Uppingham School for seventeen years. When the Surrey scorer died in 1927, he took over the position for a while.

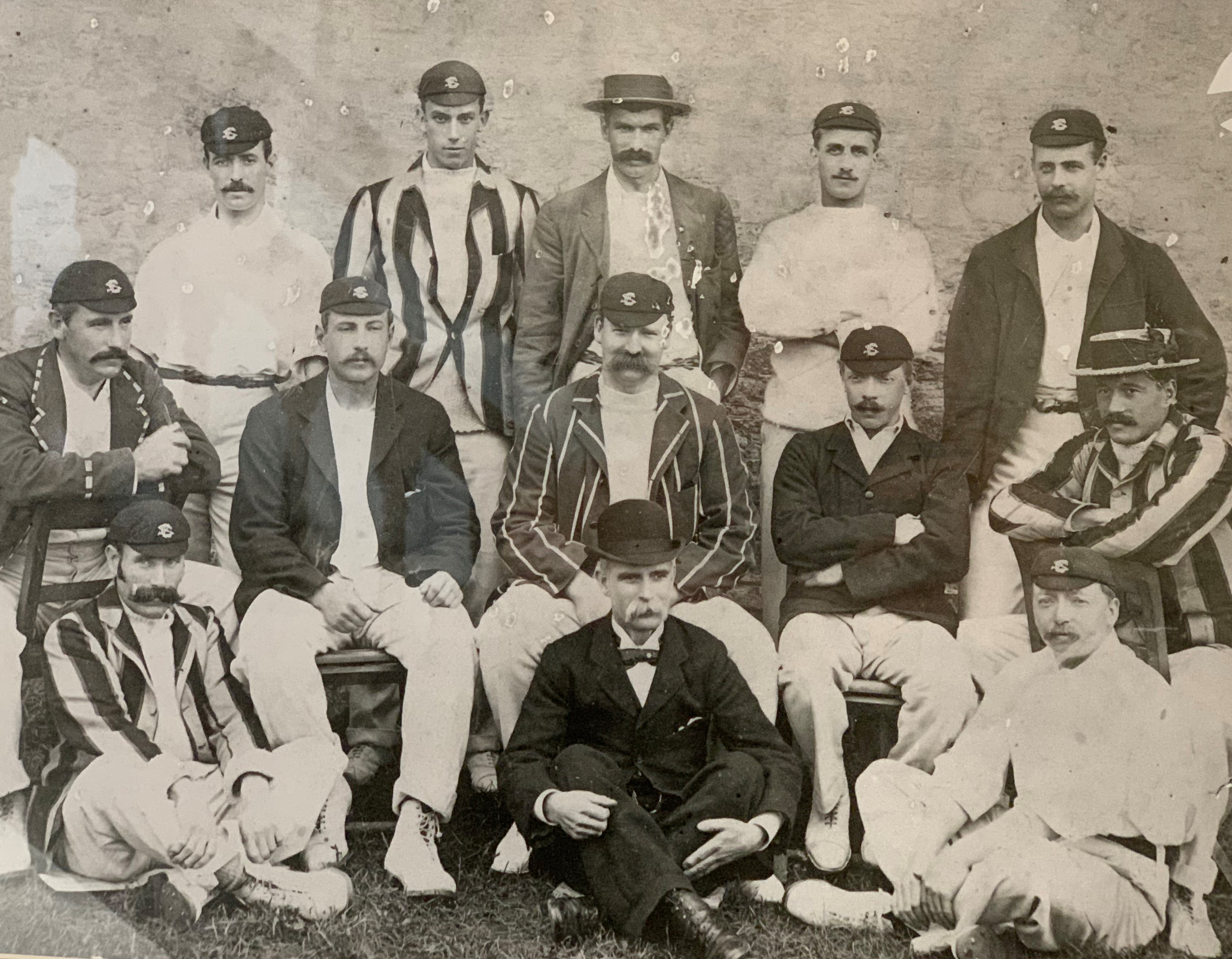
Surrey's County Championship winning side of 1894, with Baldwin seated on the ground, front, right (from a photo on display in the pavilion at The Oval)
