= George Baldwin House =

Historic house in Connecticut, United States

- U.S. National Register of Historic Places
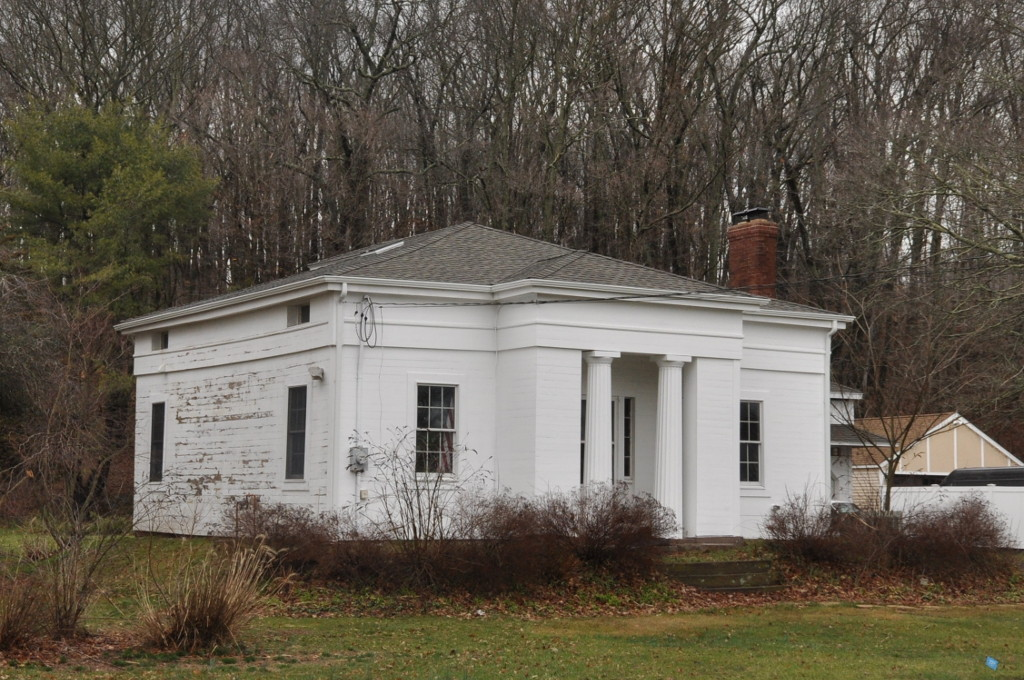

- Location within Connecticut Location within the United States
- Location: 530 Foxon Road Connecticut Route 80, North Branford, Connecticut
- Coordinates: 41°19′54″N 72°48′17″W
- Area: 0.5 acres (0.20 ha)
- Architect: Town, Ithiel
- Architectural style: Greek Revival
- NRHP reference No.: 77001411
- Added to NRHP: September 15, 1977

The George Baldwin House is a historic house at 530 Foxon Road, State Route 80, North Branford, New Haven County, Connecticut. Probably built in the 1830s, its distinctive Greek Revival design has been attributed to architect Ithiel Town. Documentation of the house was compiled after 1933. The house was listed on the National Register of Historic Places in 1977.

== Description and history ==
The George Baldwin House stands in western North Branford, on the North Side of Foxon Road (Connecticut Route 80) near its Junction with Arthur Road. It is a modest single-story wood-frame structure, covered with a truncated hip roof and wooden clapboard siding. It is nearly square in plan, with a projecting entrance bay at the center of the street-facing facade. It has two Doric columns set in antis in front of the entrance, which has flanking sidelights and a transom window. The building is encircled by a broad entablature. Windows are rectangular sash, with lightly moulded framing. The interior is arranged in a central hall plan with four flanking rooms, but has little of its original decorative elements.

The construction date of this house is not known with certainty, owing to disagreements among documentary and oral history records. Based on its stylistic appearance, it was probably built in 1830s. Its attribution to New Haven architect Ithiel Town is also uncertain, but is plausible based on the building's design, which includes academically correct proportions for its Greek Revival elements. It is also rendered plausible by the possible association of Town with Micah Baldwin, a New York City merchant who was the uncle and financial benefactor of George Baldwin, a farmer of modest means.

== See also ==
- National Register of Historic Places listings in New Haven County, Connecticut
