= Zaccheus Baldwin House =

Historic house in Connecticut, United States

- U.S. National Register of Historic Places
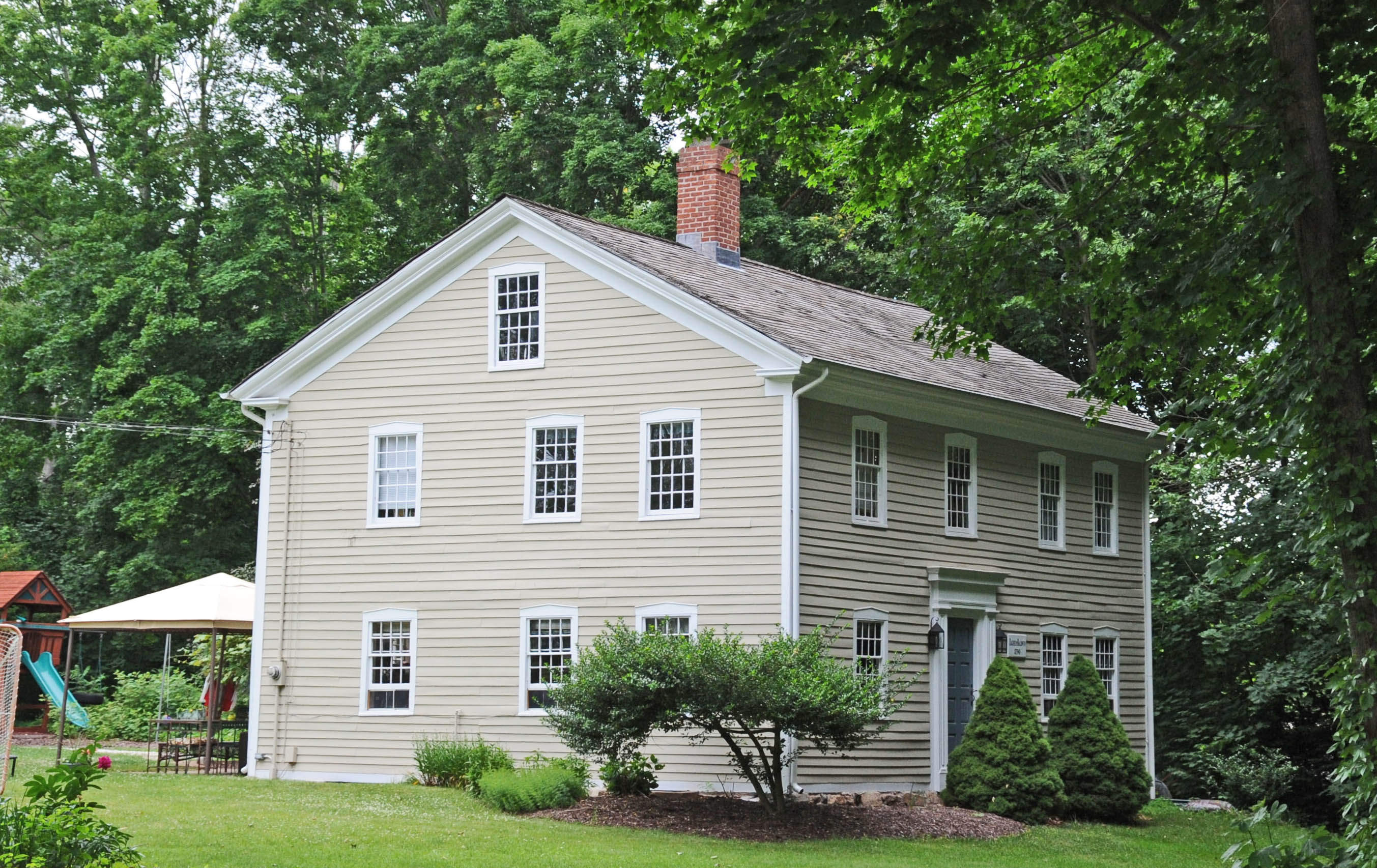

- Location within Connecticut Location within the United States
- Location: 154 Damascus Road, Branford, Connecticut
- Coordinates: 41°17′10″N 72°47′09″W
- Area: 1.1 acres (0.45 ha)
- Built: 1775
- Built by: Baldwin, Zaccheus
- Architectural style: Colonial, Late New England Colonial
- MPS: Colonial Houses of Branford TR
- NRHP reference No.: 88002631
- Added to NRHP: December 1, 1988

The Zaccheus Baldwin House is a historic house at 154 Damascus Road in Branford, Connecticut. Built in the last quarter of the 18th century, it is one of Branford's small number of surviving and well-preserved houses of that period. It was listed on the National Register of Historic Places in 1988.

== Description and history ==
The Zaccheus Baldwin House is located east of Branford's town center, in a suburban residential setting at the northeast corner of Damascus and Windmill Hill Roads. It is a 2 1/2-story wood-frame structure, with a gabled roof, central chimney, and clapboarded exterior. Its main facade faces south toward Damascus Road, and is four bays wide. The main entrance is set in the center-left bay, flanked by pilasters and topped by a corniced entablature. Windows are set in rectangular openings in a symmetrical arrangement, with slightly peaked lintels.

The exact date of construction of the house is not known. Based on the stylistic evidence, it is estimated to date the last quarter of the 18th century. Its massing and basic form are typical of early-to-mid 18th century houses, but other features such as corner gable returns are typically later in style. The Baldwins were a family of long standing in this part of Branford; Zaccheus Baldwin was a farmer.

== See also ==
- National Register of Historic Places listings in New Haven County, Connecticut
