= Henri Baudouin =

French politician (1926–2020)

Mayor of Granville
- In office 1961–1977
- In office 1983–1989

Personal details
- Born: 18 June 1926 Saint-Georges-de-Gréhaigne, France
- Died: 26 May 2020 (aged 93) Paris, France
- Party: UDF
- Profession: Lawyer

Henri Baudouin (18 June 1926 – 26 May 2020) was a French politician who served as a Deputy between 1962 and 1986. He was twice mayor of Granville, from 1961 to 1977, and again from 1983 to 1989.

He was born in Ille-et-Vilaine, on 18 June 1926, and trained as a lawyer. Over the course of his tenure in the National Assembly, Baudouin represented the Union for the New Republic, Union of Democrats for the Republic, Independent Republicans, and Union for French Democracy. He was awarded Chevalier of the Légion d'honneur.
