= Robert Baldwin (disambiguation) =

Robert Baldwin (1804–1858) was a Canadian statesman.

Robert Baldwin may also refer to:

== People ==
=== Arts and entertainment ===
- Robert Baldwin (American actor) (1904–1996), American actor
- Robert Baldwin (cartoonist) (1914–1977), American cartoonist
- Bob Baldwin (musician) (born 1960), American jazz musician and composer
- Robert Baldwin (Canadian-Japanese actor) (1965–2024), Canadian-Japanese actor
- Robert M. Baldwin, cinematographer of McBain

=== Politics ===
- Robert C. Baldwin (1934–2016), American politician in Maryland
- Bob Baldwin (politician) (born 1955), Australian politician

=== Sports and games ===
- Bobby Baldwin (born c. 1950), American professional poker player
- Billy Baldwin (baseball) (Robert Harvey Baldwin, 1951–2011), American baseball player
- Tiny Baldwin (Robert West Baldwin, 1904–1959), American Negro league baseball player

=== Other people ===
- Robert Baldwin, American pastor and distributor of Miracle Mineral Solution in Uganda
- Robert Baldwin (fl. 1718–1722), Jamaican printer
- Robert B. Baldwin (1923–2017), United States Navy vice admiral
- Robert P. Baldwin (1917–1994), United States Air Force flying ace in the Korean War
- Robert H. B. Baldwin (1920–2016), American businessman and undersecretary of the U.S. Navy

== Fictional characters ==
- Robbie Baldwin, fictional superhero in Marvel Comics

== See also ==
- Robert-Baldwin, a provincial electoral district in the Montreal region of Quebec, Canada
