= George Baldwin (footballer) =

English footballer

Joseph George Baldwin (26 July 1921 – 1976) was an English professional footballer. Born in Islington, he played for Gravesend & Northfleet from 1948 until 1951, when he joined Dartford. Just two months later, however, he was signed by professional club Gillingham of the Football League Third Division South. He made his Football League debut against Leyton Orient in October 1951 in place of the injured Jimmy Boswell but had a disastrous match, with one local newspaper commenting that he looked "completely out of his depth" in professional football. He was never chosen for the club's first team again, although he was a regular for the reserves. Nothing is known of his career after he left Priestfield Stadium.
