= Jack Baldwin =

Jack Baldwin may refer to:

- Sir Jack Baldwin (chemist) (1938–2020), British chemist
- Jack Baldwin (footballer) (born 1993), English footballer for Colchester United
- Sir Jack Baldwin (RAF officer) (1892–1975)
- Jack Baldwin (racing driver, born 1948), American racing driver
- Jack Baldwin (racing driver, born 2003), American stock car racing driver
- Jack Baldwin (American football) (1921–1989)

== See also ==
- John Baldwin (disambiguation)
