= Baldwin II =

Baldwin II may refer to:

- Baldwin II of Flanders (c. 865–918)
- Baldwin II of Boulogne (c. 990–c. 1033)
- Baldwin II, Count of Hainaut (1056–1098)
- Baldwin II of Jerusalem, King of Jerusalem (died 1131)
- Baldwin II of Constantinople, Latin Emperor of Constantinople (1217–1273)
