= Joseph W. Baldwin House =

Historic house in Ohio, United States

- U.S. National Register of Historic Places
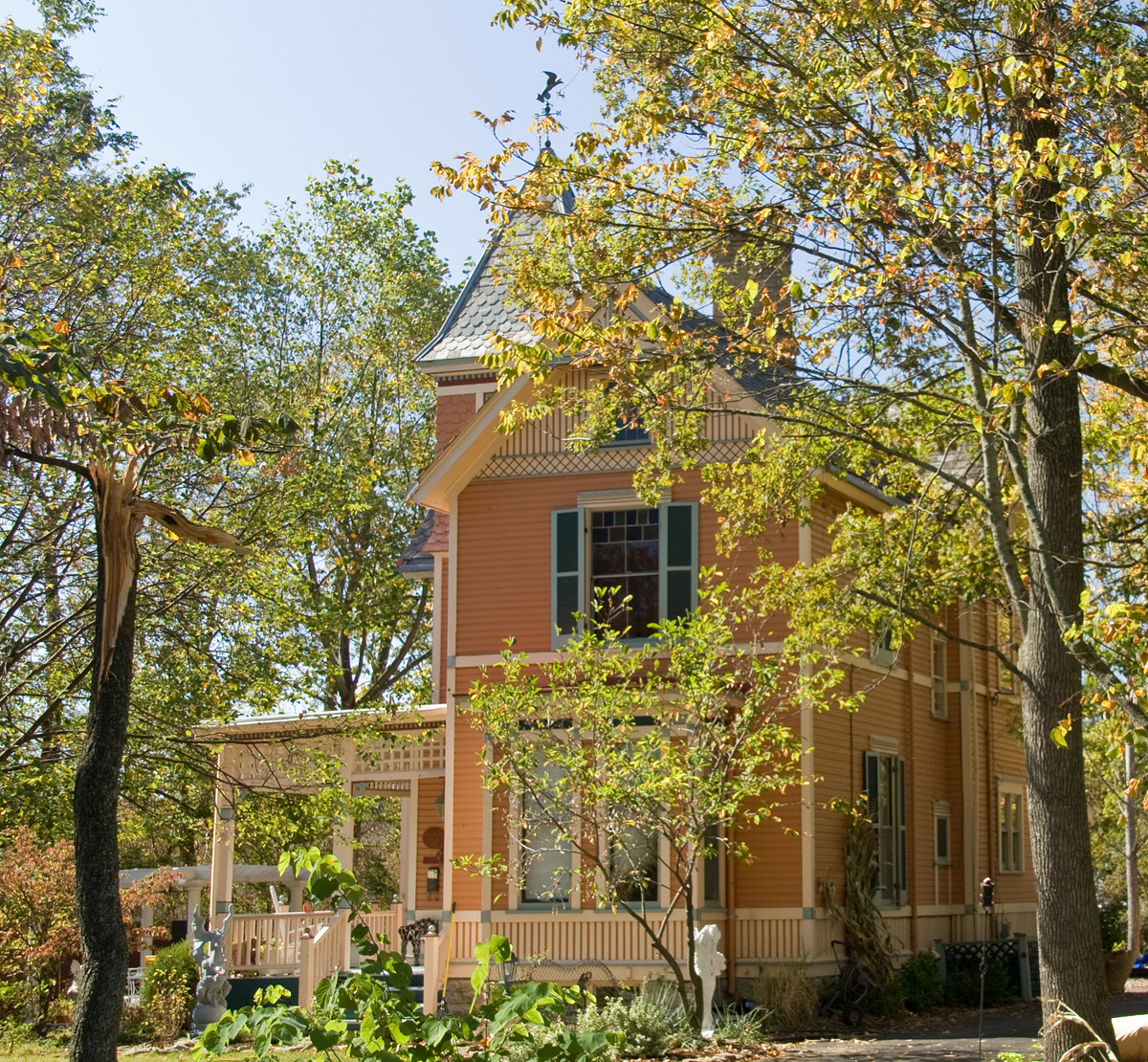
- Front of the house

- Location within Ohio Location within the United States
- Location: 217 Springfield Pike, Wyoming, Ohio
- Coordinates: 39°13′18″N 84°28′25″W
- Area: 0.7 acres (0.28 ha)
- Built: 1884
- Architectural style: Italianate
- MPS: Wyoming MRA
- NRHP reference No.: 86001628
- Added to NRHP: August 25, 1986

The Joseph W. Baldwin House is a historic residence in the city of Wyoming, Ohio, United States. Erected in the late nineteenth century, it was originally the home of a wealthy Cincinnati businessman, and it has been designated a historic site because of its distinctive architecture.

== Architecture ==
Built of weatherboarded walls with imbricated shingles, the house rests on a stone foundation; its roof is slate, while elements of wood and iron are also present. Two and a half stories tall, the house includes a three-story tower placed above a porch. The tower is covered with a pyramid-shaped roof, based on a cornice with dentils and topped with a delicate iron finial, while the roofs for the rest of the house are typical gables. Its overall floor plan is that of the letter "L"; the porch and tower are placed within the angle formed by the two ells. These elements combine to make it one of Wyoming's best Italianate houses.

== Historic context ==
Transportation networks were a leading reason for Wyoming's prosperity in the nineteenth century. The city lies near the old pre-statehood road that connected Cincinnati with locations farther north, such as Fort Hamilton and Fallen Timbers. Curves in the road were cut off in 1806, forming a new road that is today followed by Springfield Pike through central Wyoming. Improvements in the 1830s only enhanced its importance. By this time, another mode of transportation had become significant: the Miami and Erie Canal was built a short distance to the east in 1828, and the village of Lockland grew up along its side. Railroads reached the city in 1851 with the construction of the Cincinnati, Hamilton, and Dayton Railroad on the border between Lockland and Wyoming.

Because of Wyoming's proximity to the industry of Lockland, its easy transportation to the booming city of Cincinnati, and its pleasant scenery, many wealthy industrialists purchased local farms and built grand country houses. Most such houses were built in the Wyoming Hills area, west of Springfield Pike; growth in this area continued until the coming of the Great Depression. Although not an industrialist, Joseph Baldwin was among the city's leading businessmen: much of his career was spent as an executive with C.R. Talbot, a company manufacturing nails and other iron products, while the latter part of his career was spent with Equitable Life Insurance Company. Baldwin had the house built in 1884, and he lived in it until selling it in 1900 to Lawrence Maxwell, a Cincinnati lawyer who owned it for the next seven years.

== Historic site ==
In 1979, a local historic preservation group began a citywide survey to identify Wyoming's historic buildings, and this effort culminated with a multiple property submission of eighteen houses, the Wyoming Presbyterian Church, and one historic district to the National Register of Historic Places in 1985. Along with all but one of the other properties, the Baldwin House was listed on the Register in the following year, qualifying because of its historically significant architecture and because of its connection to Joseph Baldwin.
