= Alfred Baldwin =

Alfred Baldwin may refer to:

- Alfred Baldwin (politician) (1841–1908), English businessman and Conservative MP, father of Prime Minister Stanley Baldwin
- Alfred C. Baldwin III (1936–2020), "shadow man" in the 1972 Watergate break-in
- Alfred Baldwin (athlete) in 1938 European Athletics Championships
