= William Henry Baldwin =

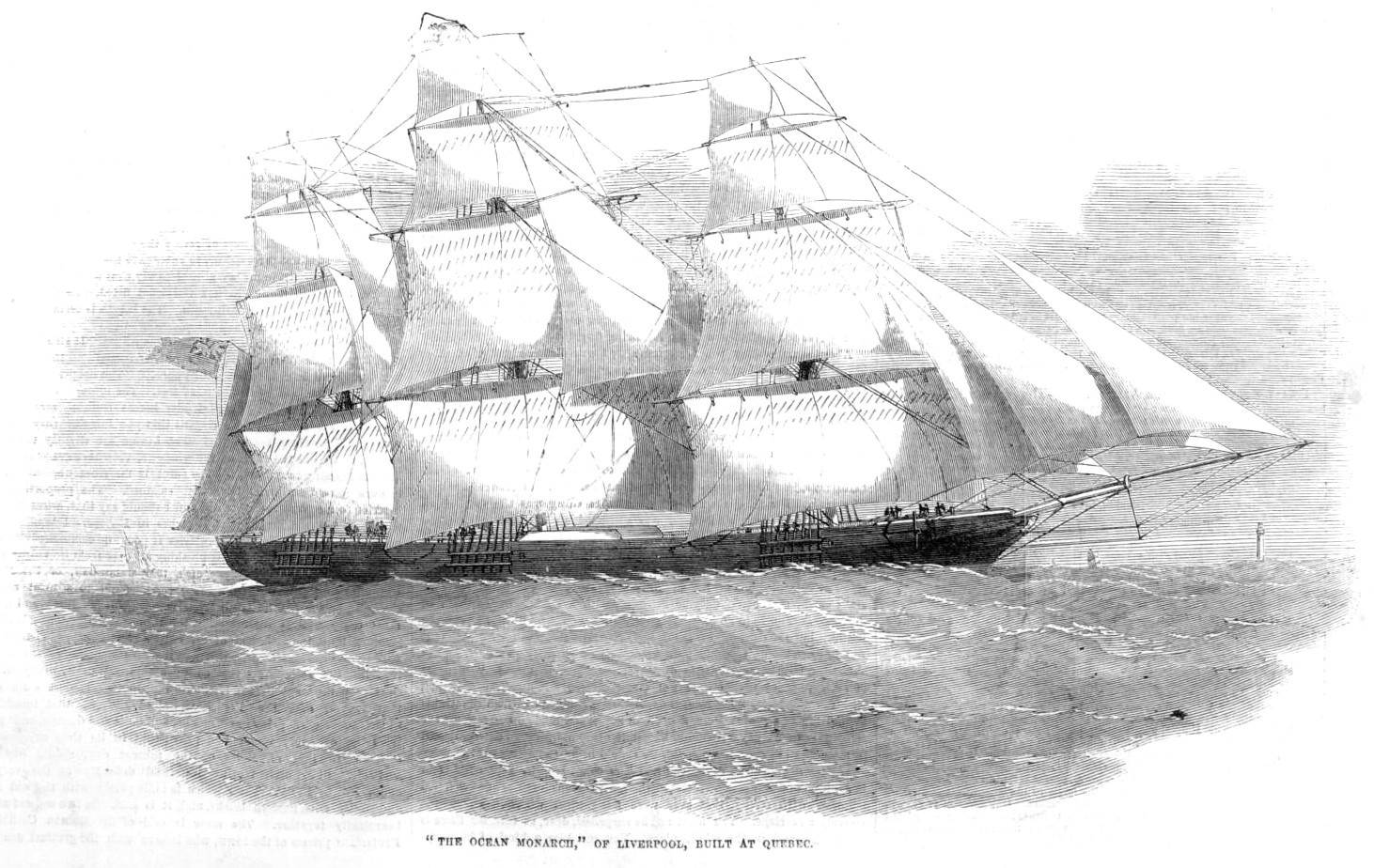
The record breaking Ocean Monarch, of Liverpool, built at Quebec in 1854. Illustrated London News, 1855

William Henry Baldwin (3 November 1827 – 17 October 1894) was a shipbuilder from Quebec who came from a ship building families on both sides of his family. He was raised by an uncle, George Black, a shipbuilder who apprenticed William to another uncle at the age of 14.

By 1851, Baldwin had formed a partnership with Henry Dinning and leased the Cape Cove shipyard for eight years. The partnership lasted for 5 years with Baldwin moving to Saint-Roch and acquiring a bankrupt shipyard. Baldwin had a great deal of success in the business and retired at the time the market for wooden ships was disappearing. He had been a ship builder for about 20 years and built many ships and furthered the commerce of the area.
