= Mark Baldwin =

Mark Baldwin may refer to:

- Mark Baldwin (choreographer), New Zealand choreographer
- Mark Baldwin (baseball) (1863–1929), American right-handed pitcher in Major League Baseball
- Mark Thomas Maitland Baldwin (born 1980), in the line of succession for the title of Earl Baldwin of Bewdley

== See also ==
- James Mark Baldwin (1861–1934), American philosopher and psychologist
- Marcus Baldwin (born 1979), Australian rules footballer
