= Ives-Baldwin House =

Historic house in Connecticut, United States

- U.S. National Register of Historic Places
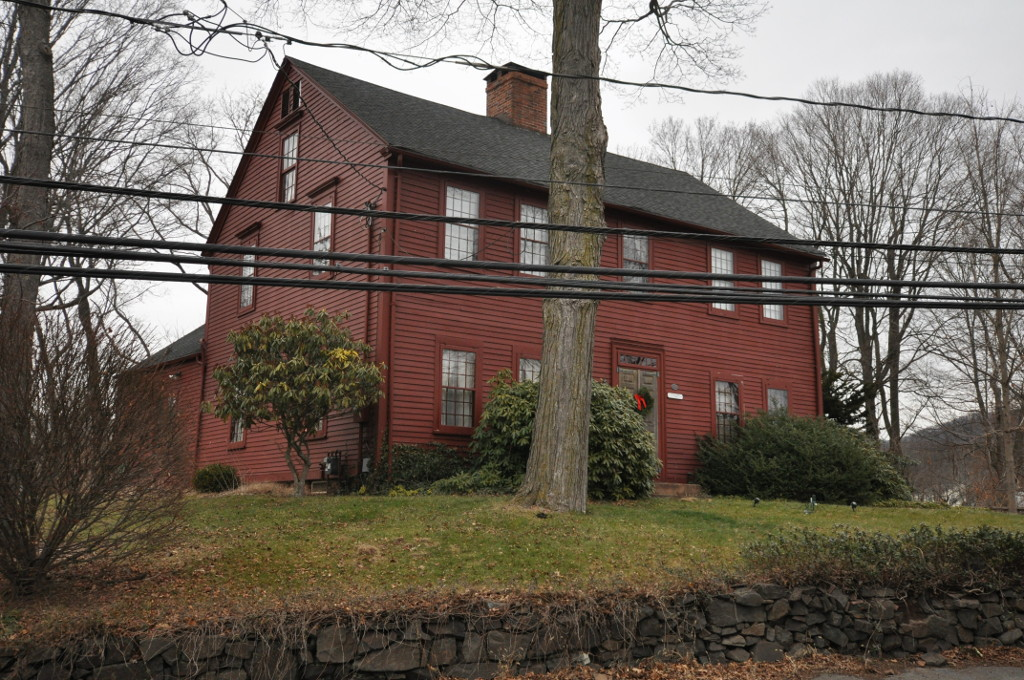

- Location within Connecticut Location within the United States
- Location: 474 Baldwin Avenue, Meriden, Connecticut
- Coordinates: 41°32′39″N 72°45′42″W
- Area: less than one acre
- Built: 1798
- Built by: Ives, Timothy
- Architectural style: Georgian
- NRHP reference No.: 03000308
- Added to NRHP: May 1, 2003

The Ives-Baldwin House is a historic house at 474 Baldwin Avenue in Meriden, Connecticut. Built about 1798, it is a well-preserved example of a late 18th-century farmhouse, a rare property type in the now largely industrial town. It was listed on the National Register of Historic Places in 2003.

== Description and history ==
The Ives-Baldwin House is in a rural-suburban area of northeastern Meriden, on the north side of Baldwin Avenue near its junction with Winding Brook Lane. It is a 2 1/2-story wood-frame structure, with a gabled roof, central chimney, and clapboarded exterior. Its main facade is five bays wide, with sash windows arranged symmetrically around a center entrance. The entrance is simply framed, with a transom window above. A gabled ell extends to the rear. The interior retains many original features, including window framing, doors, and fireplaces.

The house was built about 1798 by Thomas Ives, a carpenter. Stylistically, it is an unusually late example of a traditional Georgian style (more typically built in the mid-18th century), and is distinctive for its well-preserved interior plan and features. Ives sold the house to Moses Baldwin in 1815, in whose family it remained for a century. Moses was a successful farmer and local mill owner, who also served as town selectman; his son Nathan continued his father's businesses. The property remained in use as farmland until roughly the end of World War II, after which the surrounding land was sold off in sections for suburban residential development.

== See also ==
- National Register of Historic Places listings in New Haven County, Connecticut
