= Baldwin House (Lodge Grass, Montana) =

Historic house in Montana, United States

- U.S. National Register of Historic Places
- Location within Montana
- Location: 25 Third Ave., Lodge Grass, Montana
- Coordinates: 45°19′02″N 107°22′00″W
- Area: less than one acre
- Built: 1918
- Built by: Baldwin, E.D.
- MPS: Lodge Grass MRA
- NRHP reference No.: 87001270
- Added to NRHP: August 3, 1987

The Baldwin House in Lodge Grass, Montana, at 25 Third Ave., was built in 1918. It was listed on the National Register of Historic Places in 1987.

It is a two-story wooden building with a jerkin head roof. When built it was "one of the more substantial residences" in Lodge Grass. It is one of few older houses surviving in the town.
