= Timothy Baldwin House =

Historic house in Connecticut, United States

- U.S. National Register of Historic Places
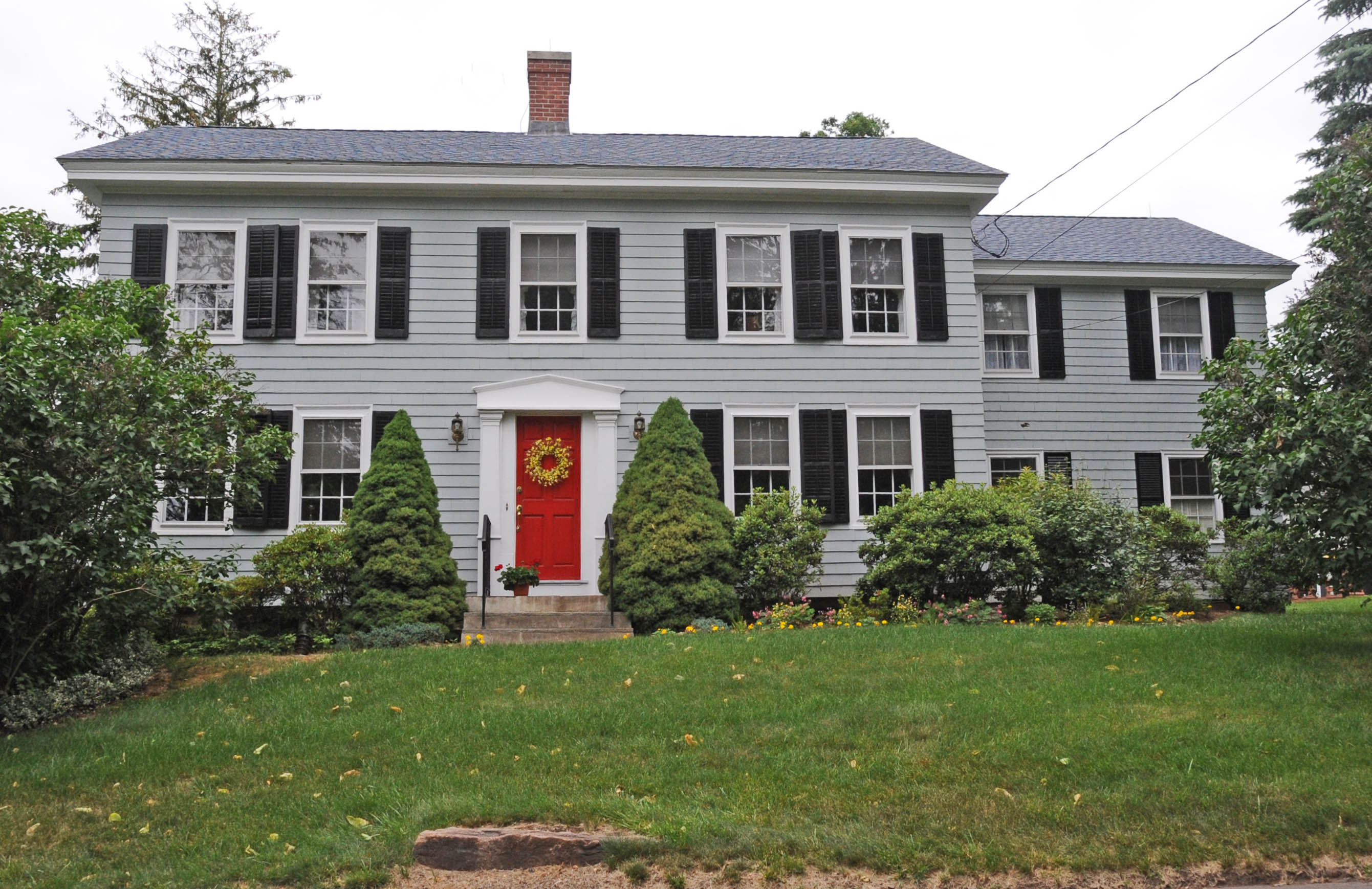

- Location within Connecticut Location within the United States
- Location: 186 Damascus Road, Branford, Connecticut
- Coordinates: 41°17′12″N 72°46′56″W
- Area: 1.2 acres (0.49 ha)
- Built: 1819
- Architectural style: Colonial, New England Colonial
- MPS: Colonial Houses of Branford TR
- NRHP reference No.: 88002633
- Added to NRHP: December 1, 1988

The Timothy Baldwin House is a historic house at 186 Damascus Road in Branford, Connecticut. Built about 1819, it is a well-preserved late example of Georgian Colonial architecture, associated with a prominent local family. It was listed on the National Register of Historic Places in 1988.

== Description and history ==
The Timothy Baldwin House is located in a suburban residential area east of Branford center, on the north side of Damascus Road just east of its junction with Patrick Lane. It is a 2 1/2-story wood-frame structure, with a side-gable roof, central chimney, and clapboarded exterior. A single-story ell extends to the right of the main block. The main block is five bays wide, with a center entrance flanked by symmetrically placed sash windows. The entrance is framed by pilasters and a peaked lintel.

The house was probably built about 1819, around the time of the marriage of Timothy Baldwin. It was probably built by Timothy's father Zaccheus, who gave his son 18 acres (7.3 ha) of farmland at the time. The Baldwin family was one of the first to settle this area of Branford. This house remained in that family until 1913.

== See also ==
- National Register of Historic Places listings in New Haven County, Connecticut
