= Baudouin Michiels =

Belgian businessman (born 1941)

- Born: 17 May 1941 (age 85)
- Education: PhD in Law; Master's degree in Social Work
- Occupation: Businessman

Baron Baudouin Michiels (born 17 May 1941) is a Belgian businessman, who worked mainly in the food industry.

== Education ==
He obtained a PhD in Law, and a master's degree in Social Work (Licence en sciences sociales de travail).

== Career ==
He started his professional career in 1963 as a trainee, with Rosenberg Onderneming in Amsterdam. In 1965 he became Marketing Assistant for Belamundi in Genval (Belgium). He began working for Côte-d'Or Belgium in 1967, where he was in charge of the Merchandising Department. In 1987 he became President-Managing Director Côte-d'Or Belgium, and after the acquisition of Côte-d'Or by Jacobs Suchard, he became President-Managing Director Jacobs Suchard Belgium and Executive Vice President of Jacobs Suchard Group. He held several leading positions in the Kraft Jacobs Suchard-Côte-d'Or group, until 17 May 2001 when an end came to his activities within the Philip Morris Group.

Beside his career in the food industry he holds several position in Non-Governmental Organisations (NGO). He is President of the Management Committee for the Prince Albert Fund, which distributes grants to young managers that want to achieve an international career. Baudouin Michiels is also President and CEO of the Belgacom Fund, which provides financial support to either local authorities or those of Social Services in Wallonia, Flanders, and in Brussels (region) that aim to improve the dialogue between the Belgian citizen and local authorities. He is a member of the Belgian businessclub Cercle de Lorraine.

== Roles in business organisations ==
According to his own biography, Michiels was president of the Belgian Union of Advertisers (UBA) from 1987 to 1998 and president of Fost Plus,the Belgian household-packaging recycling organisation, from 2000 to 2011. He was a member of the management committee of the Federation of Enterprises in Belgium (FEB) from 1992 to 2001 and chaired its social affairs committee from 1997 to 2001. He was also vice-president of the Belgian food-industry federation Fevia (1996–2002) and president of the European association of chocolate, biscuit and confectionery manufacturers (1992–1994).

== Cultural and charitable roles ==
From 1996 to 2015 Michiels was president and managing director of the Proximus Art foundation (formerly Belgacom Art),of which he is now honorary president. In that capacity he co-wrote the introduction to the catalogue The Belgacom Art Collection (2006). He is also honorary president of the brewing company Unibra and of the Walter Leblanc Foundation.

He has been associated with the Prince Albert Fund, established in 1984 by the FEB and the King Baudouin Foundation to fund one-year international business projects for young Belgian graduates.

== Sources ==
- Proximus Foundation
