= Baldwin I =

Baldwin I may refer to:

- Baldwin I of Flanders (died 879)
- Baldwin I, Count of Hainaut and shortly Count of Flanders (c. 1030–1070)
- Baldwin I of Jerusalem (c.1060–1118)
- Baldwin I of Ramla (died 1138)
- Baldwin I of Constantinople (1172–1205)

== See also ==
- Baudouin of Belgium (1930–1993)
