= Baldwin III =

Baldwin III may refer to:

- Baldwin III, Count of Flanders (940–962)
- Baldwin III, Count of Hainaut (1088–1120)
- Baldwin III of Jerusalem (1130–1162)
- Baldwin III of Ramla (early 1130s–c. 1187 or 1186–1188)
