= Abraham Dudley Baldwin =

American politician

Member of the Connecticut Senate

Member of the Connecticut House of Representatives

Personal details
- Born: April 15, 1788 Fairfield, Connecticut, U.S.
- Died: June 8, 1862 (aged 74) Greenfield Hill, Fairfield, Connecticut, U.S.
- Relatives: Abraham Baldwin (uncle); Henry Baldwin (uncle)
- Education: Yale University
- Occupation: Politician, agriculturist

Abraham Dudley Baldwin (April 15, 1788 – June 8, 1862) was an American politician.

Baldwin was born in Fairfield, Connecticut. He was the son of Dudley Baldwin, and a nephew of Abraham Baldwin, one of the framers of the US Constitution, and of Henry Baldwin, one of the Judges of the US Supreme Court.

He graduated from Yale University in 1807. He studied law, but declined to enter into practice, residing thorough his life on Greenfield Hill, chiefly engaged in agricultural pursuits, and occasionally in the discharge of public offices to which he was called by his fellow citizens. He was several times a member of the Connecticut House of Representatives, and also of the Connecticut Senate, and while a Senator he was a member of the Corporation of Yale College.

He died in Greenfield Hill, June 8, 1862, aged 74.
