= Charles Sears Baldwin =

American teacher and scholar

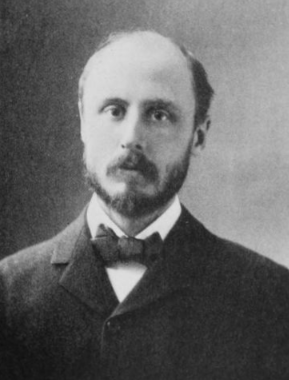
- Born: March 21, 1867; New York, New York, US
- Died: October 23, 1935 (aged 68); New York, New York, US
- Education: Columbia College
- Occupation: Academic
- Employer: Yale University
- Spouses: Agnes Irwin (m. 1894; died 1897) Gratia Eaton Whited (m. 1902)

Charles Sears Baldwin (March 21, 1867 – October 23, 1935) was an American scholar and professor of rhetoric at Yale University.

== Biography ==
Born in New York City in 1867, Baldwin entered Columbia College at seventeen and received his A.B. in 1888. He was one of the earliest students to be granted the Ph.D. degree in English at Columbia. Besides teaching at Yale (1895–1911), Baldwin also worked at Barnard College and Columbia University. He was married twice, first in 1894 to Agnes Irwin (who died in 1897), and then to Gratia Eaton Whited in 1902. Most of his life an Episcopalian, he converted to Catholicism the year before his death. Baldwin died in New York City in 1935.

== Works ==
- The Inflections and Syntax of the Morte D'Arthur of Sir Thomas Malory (1894).
- Specimens of Prose Description (1895).
- The Expository Paragraph and Sentence (1897).
- A College Manual of Rhetoric (1902).
- American Short Stories (1904).
- How to Write (1905; reprinted as The English Bible as a Guide to Writing).
- Essays Out of Hours (1907).
- Writing and Speaking (1909).
- Composition, Oral and Written (1909).
- An Introduction to English Medieval Literature (1914).
- God Unknown (1920).
- Ancient Rhetoric and Poetic (1924).
- Medieval Rhetoric and Poetic (1928).
- Three Medieval Centuries of Literature in England, 1100-1400 (1932).
- Renaissance Literary Theory and Practice (1939).

=== Other ===
- Introduction and notes to Thomas De Quincey's Revolt of the Tartars. New York: Longmans, Green & Co., 1896.
- Introduction and notes to John Bunyan's The Pilgrim's Progress. New York: Longmans, Green & Co., 1905.
- Preface to Thomas De Quincey's Joan of Arc and the English Mail-coach. New York: Longmans, Green & Co., 1906.
- "Master Vergil," The Classical Weekly 2 (5), 1908, pp. 36–37.
- Introduction to Aristotle's Poetics; Longinus on the Sublime. New York: The Macmillan Company, 1930.
- "St. Augustine on Preaching." In: The Rhetoric of St. Augustine of Hippo. Ed. Richard Leo Enos and Roger Thompson, et al. Baylor University Press, 2008, pp. 187–203.
