= Edith Ella Baldwin =

American painter (1870–1941)

- Born: November 19, 1870; Worcester, Massachusetts
- Died: February 21, 1941 (aged 70)
- Occupation: Painter

Edith Ella Baldwin (November 19, 1870 – February 21, 1941) was an American painter of portraits and miniatures, a craftswoman, and writer. She studied in Paris at Académie Julian, under William-Adolphe Bouguereau and Tony Robert-Fleury; at the Angelo Colarossi studios under Gustave-Claude-Etienne Courtois, also under Julius Rolshoven and Henry Mosler.

At the Salon of the Champ de Mars, she exhibited a portrait in pastel, in 1901; at exhibitions of the Society of American Artists in 1898 and 1899, she exhibited miniatures; also pictures in oils at Worcester, 1903. A collection of her writings are held by Duke University. These include unpublished stories, novels, poetry, and lecture notes, as well as diary excerpts. Her writings covered the timeless themes of love and religion, but also contemporary issues including automobiles, labor strikes, and women's rights.
