= Charles Baldwin House =

Historic house in Salt Lake City, Utah, U.S.

- U.S. National Register of Historic Places
- U.S. Historic district – Contributing property
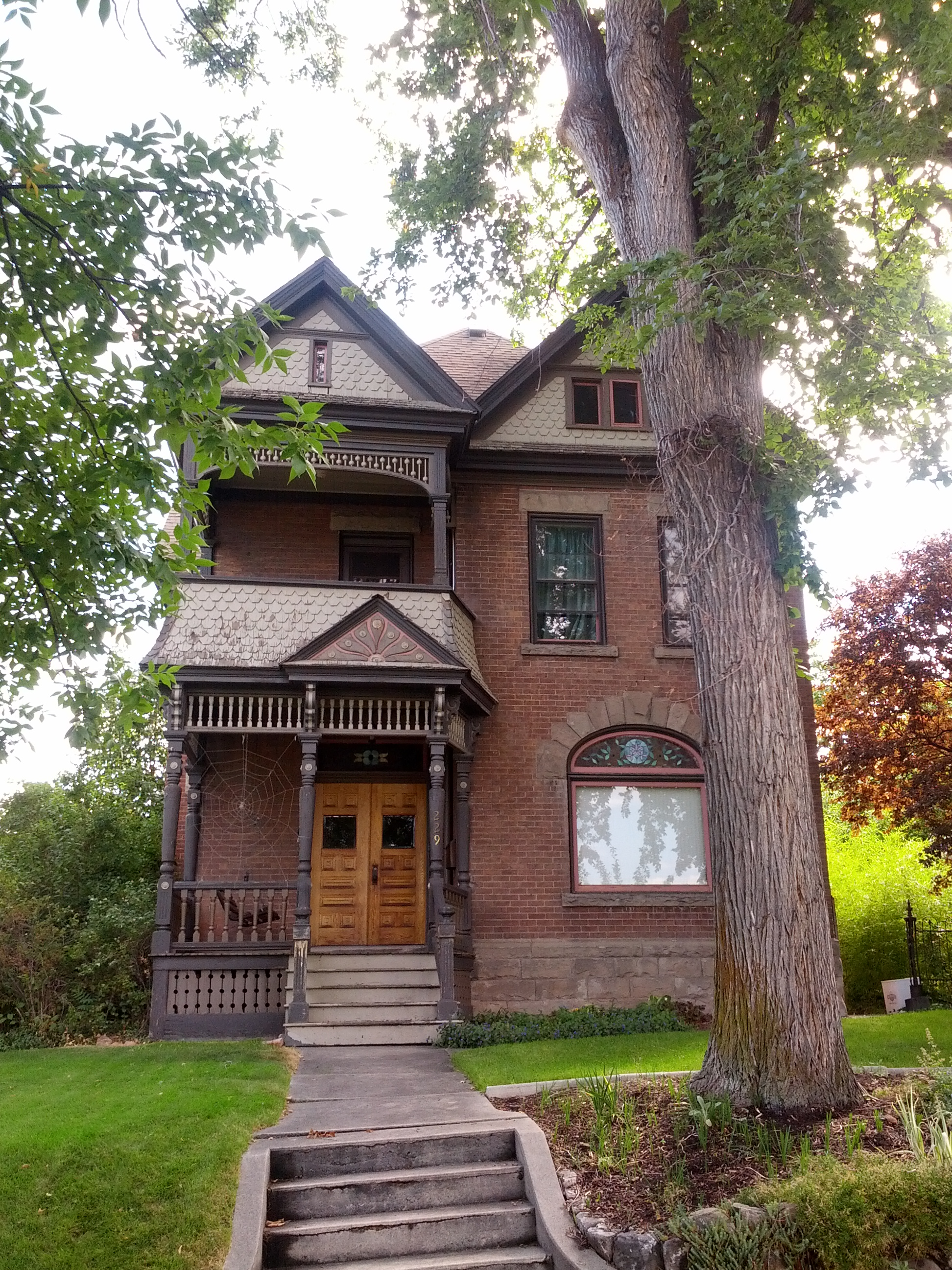
- Charles Baldwin House, September 2013

- Location within Utah Location within the United States
- Location: 229 South 1200 East; Salt Lake City, Utah; United States
- Coordinates: 40°45′52″N 111°51′21″W
- Area: less than one acre
- Built: 1890
- Architectural style: Victorian Eclectic, Queen Anne, Eastlake
- Part of: University Neighborhood Historic District (ID95001430)
- NRHP reference No.: 82004131

Significant dates
- Added to NRHP: February 11, 1982
- Designated CP: December 13, 1995

The Charles Baldwin House is a historic house in northeastern Salt Lake City, Utah, United States, that is located within the University Neighborhood Historic District, but is individually listed on the National Register of Historic Places (NRHP).

== Description ==
The house is located at 229 South 1200 East and what is today the "East Central" neighborhood. It was built in 1890 for Charles Baldwin, who served as United States Commissioner and Referee in Bankruptcy for the United States District Court from 1898 to 1921. Baldwin was also at one time the president of the Salt Lake City Board of Education and the Utah State Bar Association. His house was designed in the Victorian Eclectic style, with Queen Anne and Eastlake features. It was acquired in 1921 by Louis A. Thody, an immigrant from England who founded the X-Ray Department at the LDS Hospital and later co-founded the Coray-Thody X-Ray Laboratory. The house has been listed on the National Register of Historic Places since February 11, 1982.

== See also ==
- National Register of Historic Places listings in Salt Lake City
