= Roy Baldwin (footballer) =

Australian rules footballer

Personal information
- Full name: Royston William Baldwin
- Born: 28 July 1927; Mildura, Victoria
- Died: 24 August 2016 (aged 89)
- Original team: Mitcham
- Height: 178 cm (5 ft 10 in)
- Weight: 76 kg (168 lb)

Playing career^{1}
Years	Club	Games (Goals)
1944–45, 1948–50	Hawthorn	41 (6)
- ^{1} Playing statistics correct to the end of 1950.

Royston William Baldwin OAM (28 July 1927 – 24 August 2016) was an Australian rules footballer who played with Hawthorn in the Victorian Football League (VFL).

Baldwin enlisted in August 1945, two weeks after his 18th birthday, and served until October 1947, spending 18 months overseas in New Britain.

In 1982 he was awarded the Medal of the Order of Australia for "services to sport in the fields of cricket and Australian rules football."
