= Boudewijn Karel Boom =

Dutch botanist and author

Boudewijn Karel Boom (1903–1980) was a Dutch botanist and writer.

The standard author abbreviation Boom is used to indicate this person as the author when citing a botanical name.
