= Roy Alvin Baldwin =

American politician (1885–1940)

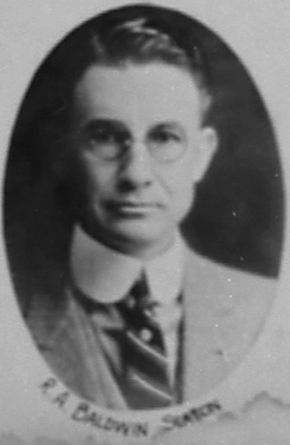
- Baldwin in 1923

Member of the Texas House of Representatives from the 122nd district
- In office May 20, 1920 – January 9, 1923
- Preceded by: William H. Bledsoe
- Succeeded by: Dewey Young

Member of the Texas House of Representatives from the 119th district
- In office January 9, 1923 – January 13, 1925
- Preceded by: John Quaid
- Succeeded by: James K. Wester

Personal details
- Born: January 2, 1885 Mercer County, Missouri, U.S.
- Died: October 2, 1940 (aged 55) Slaton, Texas, U.S.
- Party: Democratic
- Education: University of New Mexico

Roy Alvin Baldwin (January 2, 1885 – October 2, 1940) was an American politician. A member of the Democratic Party, he served in the Texas House of Representatives from 1920 to 1925.

== Life and career ==
Baldwin was born in Mercer County, Missouri, the son of Marion Baldwin and Lucinda Ellen Garriott. He attended and graduated from the University of New Mexico. After graduating, he worked as a lawyer.

Baldwin served in the Texas House of Representatives from 1920 to 1925. During his service in the House, in 1923, he supported the creation of Texas Tech University, a public research university in Lubbock, Texas.

== Death ==
Baldwin died on October 2, 1940, in Slaton, Texas, at the age of 55.
