= Percival G. Baldwin =

American politician (1880–1936)

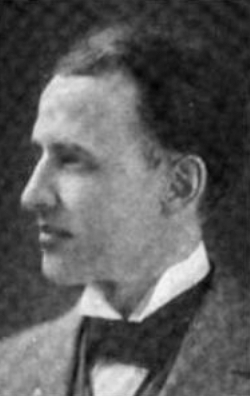

Member of the Illinois Senate
- In office 1914–1918

Personal details
- Born: Percival Gilmore Baldwin; December 15, 1880 St. George, New Brunswick, Canada
- Died: December 26, 1936 (aged 56) Chicago, Illinois, United States
- Party: Republican
- Education: John Marshall Law School
- Occupation: Politician

Percival Gilmore Baldwin (December 15, 1880 – December 26, 1936) was born in St. George, New Brunswick, Canada. He then moved to United States with his parents in 1882 and settled in Vermont. He studied at the Montpelier Seminary in Montpelier, Vermont and at the John Marshall Law School in Chicago, Illinois. Baldwin moved to Chicago in 1900 and was a real estate broker and contractor. Baldwin served in the Illinois Senate from 1915 to 1919 and was a Republican. He also served as a delegate in the Fifth Illinois Constitutional Convention of 1920. Baldwin died from injuries at the Cook County Hospital after being struck by an automobile.
