= Joseph Baldwin Academy =

The Joseph Baldwin Academy, or JBA, is a summer program for gifted students in grades 8 through 10. Founded in 1985, it is intended to provide opportunities for social growth as the students explore college life and take university-level courses. JBA consists of two three-week sessions; students apply for acceptance for one of the two sessions, and an academic course. Joseph Baldwin Academy reached its 40th anniversary in 2025.

The academy is run by Truman State University (formerly Northeastern Missouri State University, until it changed its name in the mid-1990s), and is staffed by Truman State students, a team of professional directors, faculty, and alumni. It is located on the Truman State campus in Kirksville, Missouri.

Joseph Baldwin statue on the Truman State University campus
