= David Baldwin House =

Historic house in New Jersey, US

- U.S. National Register of Historic Places
- New Jersey Register of Historic Places
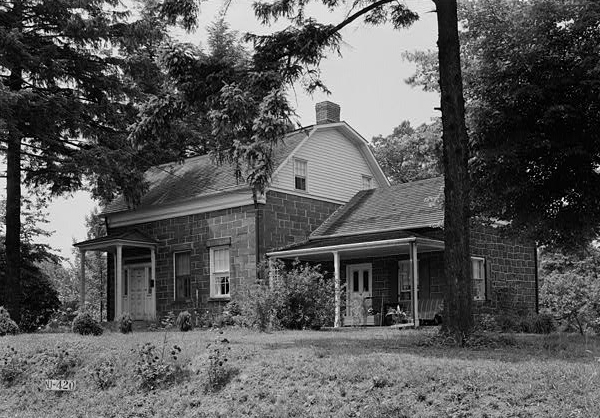

- Location within Bergen County, New Jersey Location within New Jersey Location within the United States
- Location: 60 Lake Avenue, Midland Park, New Jersey
- Coordinates: 40°58′56″N 74°8′16″W
- Area: less than one acre
- Built: 1838
- MPS: Stone Houses of Bergen County TR
- NRHP reference No.: 83001459
- NJRHP No.: 575

Significant dates
- Added to NRHP: January 10, 1983
- Designated NJRHP: October 3, 1980

The David Baldwin House is located in Midland Park, Bergen County, New Jersey, United States. The house was added to the National Register of Historic Places on January 10, 1983. The house was built in 1838.

David Baldwin was an engineer and inventor who patented various machines from the 1830s to 1870s.

== See also ==
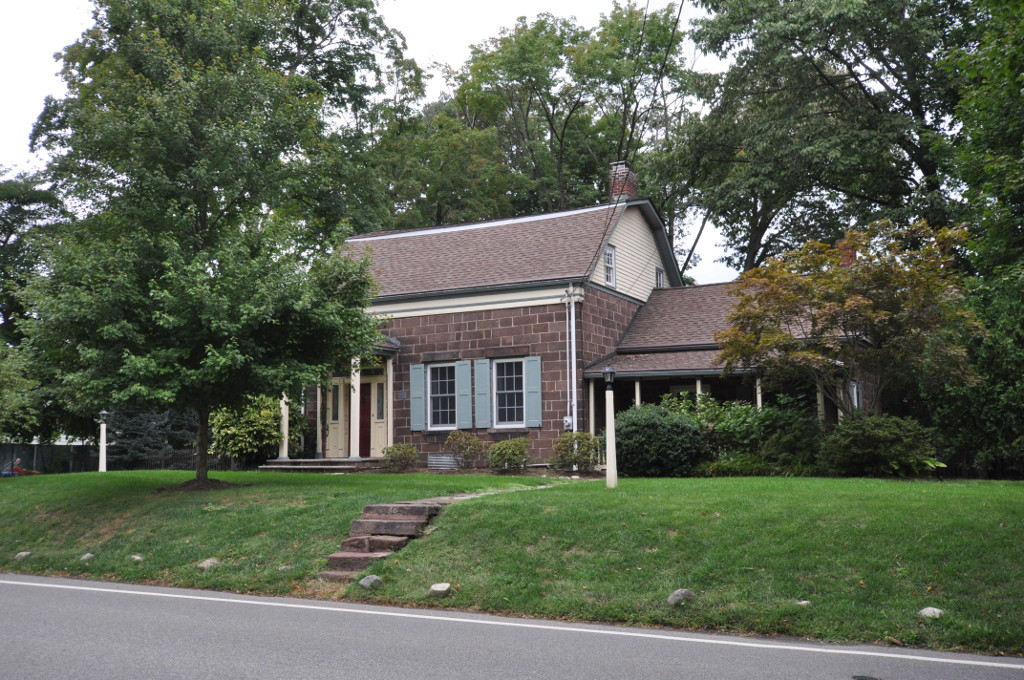
The house in 2019

- National Register of Historic Places listings in Bergen County, New Jersey
