= Lewis V. Baldwin =

American scholar of religion

Lewis V. Baldwin is an American historian, author, and professor specializing in the history of the black churches in the United States. He is an acknowledged expert on the Spencer Churches, the oldest black denominations in the country. He currently teaches at Vanderbilt University.
