= Baldwin House (Woburn, Massachusetts) =

Historic house in Massachusetts, United States

- Loammi Baldwin Mansion
- U.S. National Register of Historic Places
- U.S. Historic district – Contributing property
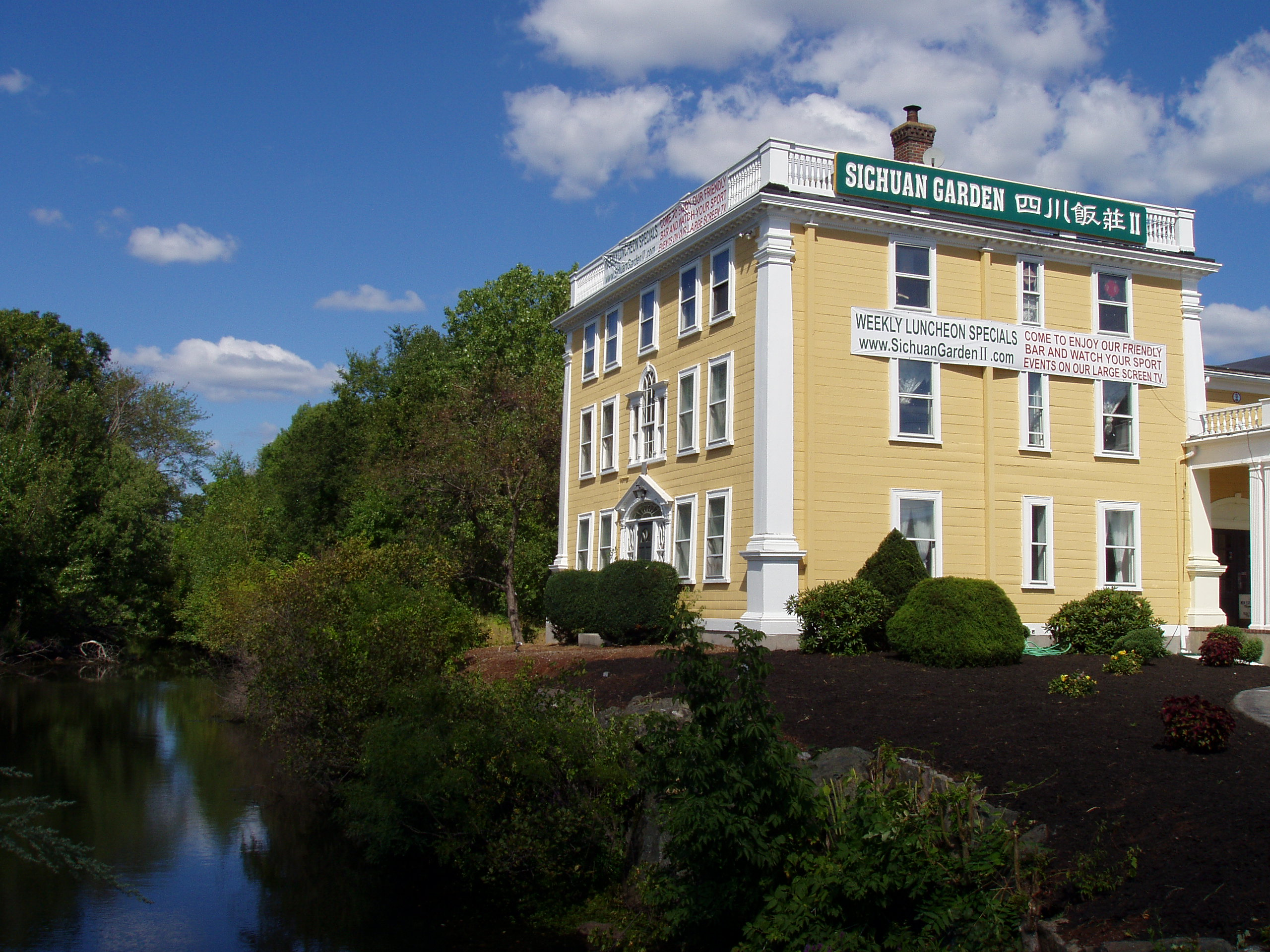
- Baldwin House, Woburn, Massachusetts with a stretch of the Middlesex Canal in the foreground.

- Location within Massachusetts Location within the United States
- Interactive map showing the location for Baldwin House
- Location: 2 Alfred Street, Woburn, Massachusetts
- Coordinates: 42°30′8″N 71°9′29″W
- Built: 1750
- Architectural style: Federal
- Part of: Middlesex Canal Historic and Archaeological District (ID09000036)
- NRHP reference No.: 71000090

Significant dates
- Added to NRHP: October 7, 1971
- Designated CP: November 19, 2009

The Baldwin House, also known as the Loammi Baldwin Mansion, is a Colonial American mansion located in Woburn, Massachusetts. On October 7, 1971, it was added to the National Register of Historic Places.

It is currently a restaurant called Sichuan Garden. There was debate about using the property as a restaurant but ultimately the plans were approved as being sufficiently respectful of the historical nature of the site.

The historic 1790 House was across the Middlesex Canal.

== History ==
The original Baldwin House was built in 1661 by Henry Baldwin, one of Woburn's first settlers, making this building the oldest home in Woburn. In 1803 his great-grandson, noted engineer Col. Loammi Baldwin, greatly enlarged the house to its current form. (This younger Baldwin, known as the Father of American Civil Engineering, created the Middlesex Canal, and lent his name to the Baldwin apple, discovered nearby.) At that time its grounds were 212 acres (0.86 km^{2}) in extent. On the south, between the house and the canal, was formerly a beautiful garden, with walks and trees, superior to anything in the region. All traces have long since disappeared under suburban sprawl.

All told, six generations of Baldwins lived in the house, as documented in John Farmer's Genealogical Register of the First Settlers of New England: Henry Baldwin from 1661 to 1697; Henry Baldwin, son of the above; then James Baldwin; Loammi Baldwin, son of James, to 1807; he put on a third story. Benjamin F. Baldwin, 1807 to 1822; Loammi, Mary, and Clarissa Baldwin, from 1822 to 1836. George R. Baldwin from 1836 to November, 1887 (or to death, October 11, 1888.) After leaving the family's ownership it became a boarding house, within which resided Baldwin family members until the 1930s, and a restaurant.

The house is nearly cubical in form, three stories tall, with false ashlar front facade and clapboarding elsewhere, full-height pilasters at the corners, and a balustrade above the eaves. The entry door is ornamented with a classic pediment and lights, and further graced by an elegant Palladian window above. In West Baldwin, Maine one can see a copy of the Baldwin house built by Loammi Baldwin for Josiah Pierce also referred to as "Baldwin house".

In 1971 the house was moved to its current site to make way for expansion of a supermarket shopping area, immediately adjacent to the Middlesex Canal, from its original location just west of Main Street at the Route 128 rotary (now commercial sprawl). Remnants of the canal can still be seen near the original home site and adjacent to the Showcase Cinemas parking lot.

== See also ==
- National Register of Historic Places listings in Middlesex County, Massachusetts
