= First Burial Ground (Woburn, Massachusetts) =

Historic site in Middlesex County, Massachusetts

- U.S. National Register of Historic Places
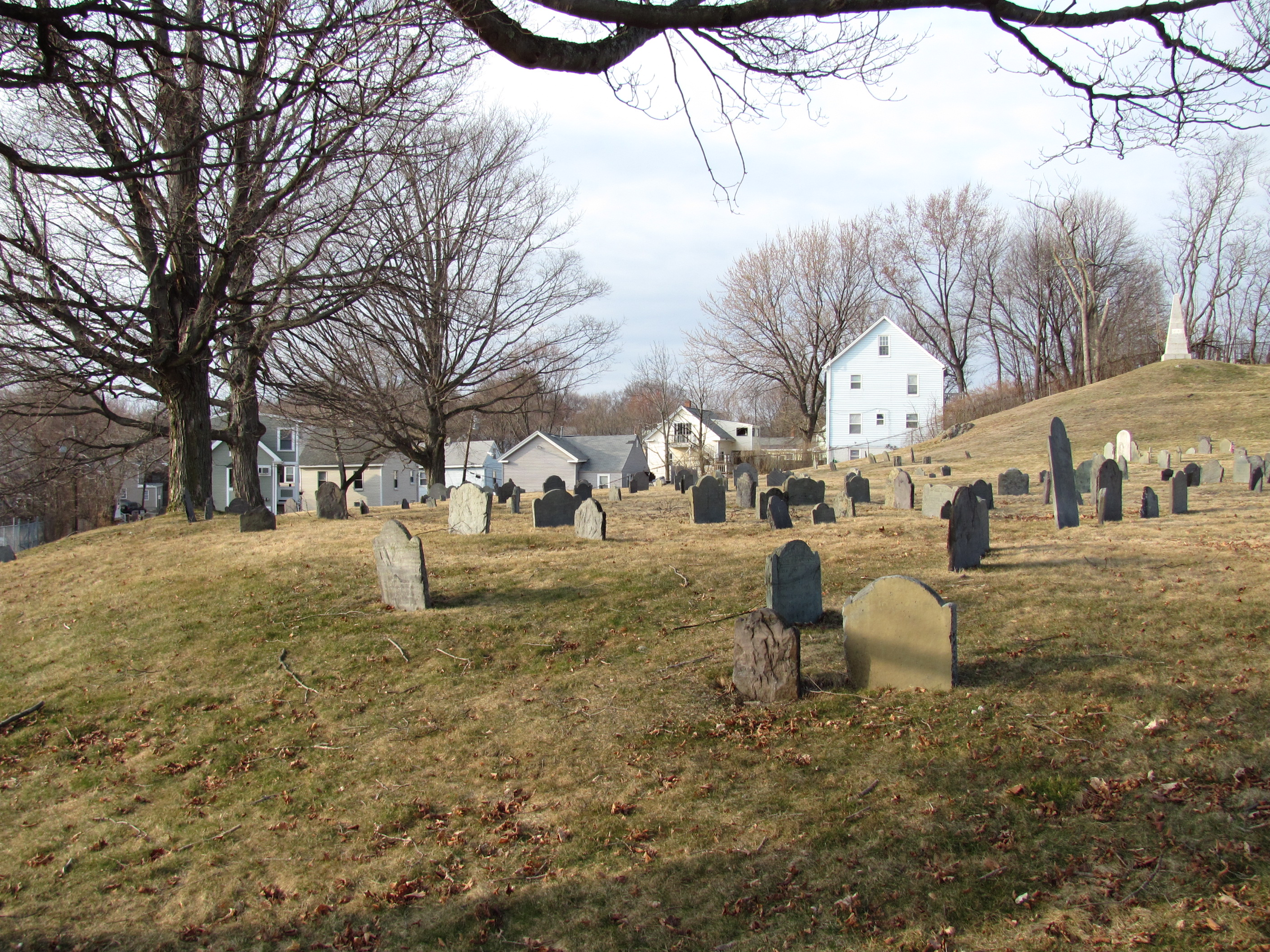
- First Burial Ground

- Location within Massachusetts Location within the United States
- Location: Woburn, Massachusetts
- Coordinates: 42°28′54″N 71°9′11″W
- NRHP reference No.: 04001222
- Added to NRHP: November 13, 2004

The First Burial Ground or Park Street Burial Ground is a historic cemetery on Park Street near Centre Street in Woburn, Massachusetts. Established c. 1646, it is the city's first and oldest cemetery. It occupies a 1.4-acre (0.57 ha) parcel at the corner of Park and Centre Streets near Woburn Square. Most of the burials took place before 1794, and are marked by slate headstones. The last documented burial took place in 1903. In a manner typical of early colonial cemeteries, there is no formal circulation pattern, and graves are not laid out in any formal, organized manner.

There are several prominent burials in the cemetery. Probably the most well-known individuals interred here are members of the Baldwin family. Loammi Baldwin, an American Revolutionary War veteran and early civil engineer, is buried here, as are three of his sons, Benjamin Franklin Baldwin, James Fowle Baldwin, and Loammi Baldwin Jr. Locally notable burials include two Woburn founders Edward Johnson and Thomas Carter, and four of its early ministers. Another prominent family monument is that of the Fowle family, an 8-foot (2.4 m) column topped by an urn.

Some of the early grave markers were carved by Joseph Lamson, a noted Charlestown carver. Stones attributed to him include slate markers carved with a traditional winged-skull motif, where the skull features eyebrows, a unique characteristic of his work. Lamson and other members of his family are known to have carved many markers in the area throughout the 18th century.

The cemetery was added to the National Register of Historic Places in 2004. The cemetery is currently locked and can only be opened on weekdays by calling the Woburn Cemetery Commission.

== See also ==
- National Register of Historic Places listings in Middlesex County, Massachusetts
