= Butters-Avery House =

Historic house in Massachusetts, United States

- U.S. National Register of Historic Places
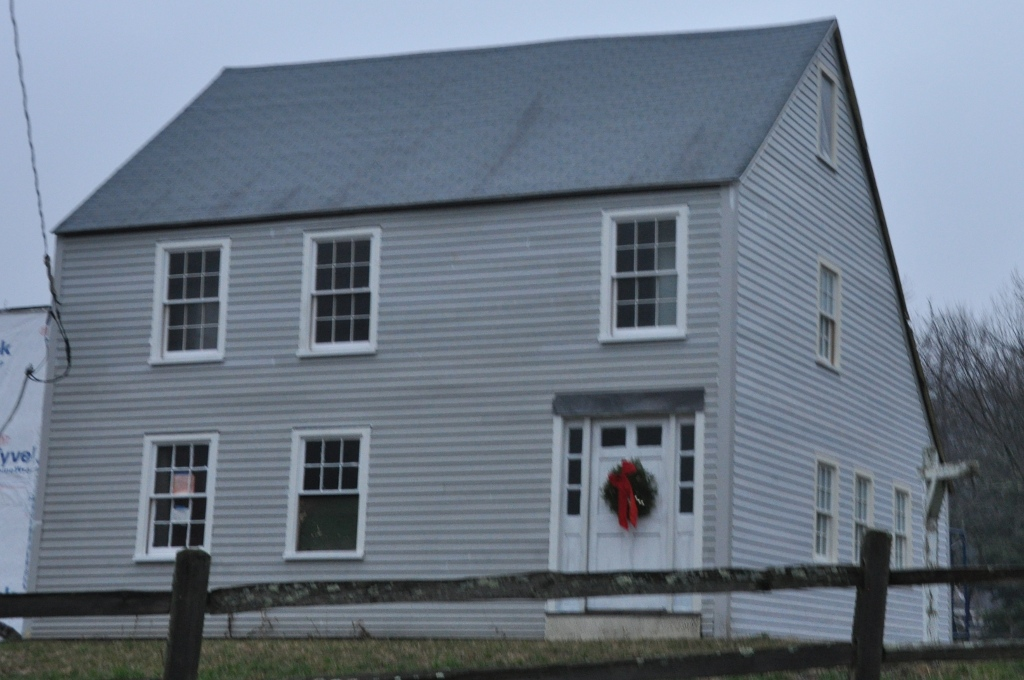

- Location within Massachusetts Location within the United States
- Location: 165 Chestnut Street, Wilmington, Massachusetts
- Coordinates: 42°31′57″N 71°10′34″W
- Built: c. 1720
- Architectural style: Colonial
- MPS: First Period Buildings of Eastern Massachusetts TR
- NRHP reference No.: 10000413
- Added to NRHP: July 3, 2010

The Butters-Avery House, also known as the Butters Farm, is a historic First Period house at 165 Chestnut Street in Wilmington, Massachusetts. The property is recognized as the origin site of the Baldwin apple.

== Description and history ==
The house is a two-story, three-bay-wide, timber-frame structure with an integral rear lean-to section. When it was built, c. 1720, it sat on a tract of some 100 acres (40 ha) (originally granted to William Butters c. 1665) which remained intact until subdivided for housing in the 20th century. Analysis of its framing suggests that there was probably once a large chimney in the right-hand bay, although there is also some evidence that the house might have been larger, presumably the five-bay width of typical colonial houses. William Butters served on Wilmington's first board of selectmen following the town's incorporation in 1730.

The farm is also recognized as the origin site of the Baldwin apple, one of the most popular apples in 19th-century New England. The original tree was raised on the property by William Butters (1711–1784) and was known locally as the "Woodpecker" or "Butters" apple before being renamed for Loammi Baldwin of Woburn, who took cuttings from the tree while surveying the route of the Middlesex Canal. A monument commemorating the discovery was erected on the property by the Rumford Historical Association in 1895.

After the house was threatened with demolition in 2005, residents voted overwhelmingly at the April 2006 annual town meeting to purchase the property in order to preserve it. Funding came from a $70,000 Massachusetts Preservation Project Fund emergency acquisition grant and a $450,000 state legislative appropriation secured by Representative James Miceli and Senator Bruce Tarr. The house was listed on the National Register of Historic Places on July 3, 2010.

== See also ==
- Baldwin (apple)
- List of the oldest buildings in Massachusetts
- National Register of Historic Places listings in Middlesex County, Massachusetts
