= Horn Pond (Massachusetts) =

Pond in Woburn, Massachusetts

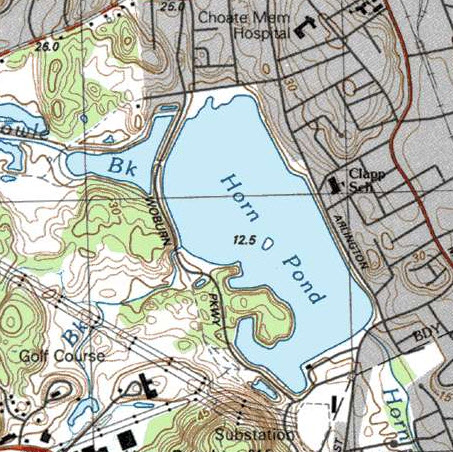
- USGS Topographical Map showing Horn Pond.

- Location within Massachusetts Location within the United States
- Location: Woburn, Massachusetts
- Coordinates: 42°28′11″N 71°09′23.1″W
- Type: Natural great pond
- Primary inflows: Fowle Brook & Cummings Brook
- Primary outflows: Horn Pond Brook to Aberjona River
- Basin countries: United States
- Surface area: 102 acres (0.2 mi^{2})
- Average depth: 10 ft (3.0 m); Average transparency: 6 ft (1.8 m)
- Max. depth: 40 ft (12.2 m)
- Surface elevation: 139 ft (42.4 m)
- Settlements: Woburn, Massachusetts

Horn Pond is a 102-acre (41 ha) water body along the Aberjona River in Woburn, Massachusetts, in the United States. The pond is fed by several brooks and flows out via Horn Pond Brook to the Aberjona River and the Mystic Lakes, eventually reaching the Mystic River and the Atlantic Ocean. It was also traversed by the Middlesex Canal from 1802 to 1860.

Yellow perch were the most common species recorded at Horn Pond in a 1982 survey, with additional species, including: largemouth bass, pumpkinseed, bluegill, killifish, chain pickerel, golden shiner, carp, white sucker, brook trout, yellow bullhead, brown bullhead and black crappie. Trout (primarily rainbows, but also browns and brookies) have been stocked in the past, with more fish and trout in the fall. Recently, with the improvement of fish passage in the Mystic River, river herring have resumed their annual migration to Horn Pond.
