= George Rumford Baldwin =

American civil engineer

George Rumford Baldwin (North Woburn, January 26, 1798 – North Woburn, October 11, 1888) an early American civil engineer who worked with his father Loammi Baldwin and brothers Loammi Baldwin Jr., Cyrus Baldwin, Benjamin Franklin Baldwin, and James Fowle Baldwin, on the Middlesex Canal and other projects. His later works included surveying and engineering the Boston, Hartford, and Erie Railroad, the Buffalo and Mississippi Railroad, and the gas and water systems for the City of Quebec.

== Baldwin Mansion ==
The Baldwin Mansion, also known as Baldwin House (Woburn, Massachusetts) was built in 1661 by Henry Baldwin and still stands today, although not on the original site having been moved to accommodate commercial real estate development and the construction of U.S. Rt 95. The following description of the house and contents predates the transition of the house from Baldwin family ownership in the 20th century.

"The land of the original Henry Baldwin held by his descendant George R. Baldwin at the time of this death in 1888, included between 500 acres (2 km^{2}) and 600 acres (2.4 km^{2}). The mansion is on the noteworthy survivals of our earliest times in size, arrangement, adornment, and in its well preserved relics. Within it are to be found implements, household utensils, paintings, ornaments, and furnishings, with appliances, gathered by the generations which have occupied it from birth to death. Piles of trunks and boxes contain their private papers and settlements of estates. One interesting article among its contents is a large and select library of many thousand volumes, collected principally by the father and brothers of George R. Baldwin and by himself, giving evidence of their scientific and literary tastes. Learned tomes in many languages, costly illustrated works, series of scientific publications on construction and engineering, and editions of the best writers in various departments of literature, are among its treasures. This library later went to the Baker Library at MIT. The house and its contents is a memorial of one of the oldest and most distinguished families of its citizens."

His father, Loammi Baldwin, was the earliest civil engineer in Massachusetts, and a leading promoter, surveyor, designer, and engineer of the Middlesex Canal, chartered in 1793. Its course lay through his own estate, the several hundred acres belonging later to George R. Baldwin, and it was completed in 1803. The canal served its uses until superseded by the Boston and Lowell Railroad.

== Family and education ==
George Rumford Baldwin was born in the Baldwin mansion at North Woburn, January 26, 1798, and died there October 11, 1888, "having devoted his lengthened life, with the full possession of his faculties till its close, to the pursuits of practical science, as a surveyor, a civil engineer, and a constructor. He was the son of his father's second wife.

His middle name recalled the early and continued friendship which existed between his father and Count Rumford. When Count Rumford had attained that rank and title at Munich, a correspondence began between the two which is of great personal and historical interest. In a letter following the birth of George Rumford Baldwin, the father writes to the Count, "I have had a son born to me to whom I have given your name." The father wished this boy, as he grew up, to enter Harvard College, but the son was disinclined to scholarship in that institution as its standard then was, and from his earliest years his bent was for mathematical and scientific studies, pursued by himself, and for practical out-of-door work in waterways, surveying and engineering, in the examination of mills and water-power, dams and raceways. He, as we have already noticed, had marked facilities for practice of this sort, with preliminary training in a school kept by Dr. Stearns in Medford, and by accompanying his father and brother in field and office work. In his fourteenth year he made some sketches of the fortifications of Boston harbor in the War of 1812, of which his brother Loammi Baldwin Jr. was the chief engineer.

George married December 6, 1837, the stepdaughter of his brother, Loammi Baldwin Jr., namely, Catherine Richardson Beckford, daughter of Captain Thomas and Catherine (Williams) Beckford, of Charlestown. Her father was at one time the partner of Joshua Bates, the London banker. Mrs. Beckford had two daughters by her first marriage, but no child by her second. He had but one child, a daughter, who married, and resides mainly in Quebec.

== Engineering career ==
A series of his diaries for more than fifty years contain daily entries of his employments and occupations. He lived a life of marvelous industry, of wide travel, and of useful service. He was called upon as expert, witness, referee or examiner in many ways, at a period when the development of our railroad and manufacturing enterprises made a demand for talent and skill. He helped form the first associated company of engineers. He was naturally shy, modest, diffident, and reticent, of most retiring and undemonstrative ways, therefore when called upon for any utterance in public before many persons it was for him a serious strain. His social intercourse was limited, and under no circumstances could he have made a speech in public of advocacy or argument.

The following were some of his early engagements: 1821, built P. C. Brook's stone bridge; 1822–1823, in Pennsylvania with his brother; 1823–1825, at factories in Lowell; 1826, surveyed Charlestown Navy Yard also known as the Boston Navy Yard in Charlestown; executed Marine Railway; 1831–1833, in England; 1833–1834, on the Boston and Lowell Railroad; 1834–1836, in Nova Scotia; 1837, in Georgia, on Brunswick Canal. In 1845 he was chief engineer on the route to the Buffalo and Mississippi Railroad. In 1846 he was employed on the examination of the water power of Augusta, Georgia, and by the national government on the Dry Docks in Washington and Brooklyn. In 1847 he was summoned to Quebec to engage on professional tasks which occupied him till he completed them in 1856. This was the introduction of gas, water, and sewer systems into Quebec. He was in full superintendence, under the mayor and a water board. In the course of the work he sailed with his family to Europe to superintend the casting of pipes, gates, etc., and to arrange for their shipment.

In 1857–58, he was in Europe with his family, principally in Paris and London, with many excursions. With accomplished skill in draughting and etching, his pencil was ever busy in sketching all the objects of special interest, and his descriptions are illustrated by a mass of drawings, more or less perfected. He was elected a Fellow of the American Academy of Arts and Sciences in 1877.

He was connected as consulting engineer with many more modern works, the most important, perhaps, being the Boston, Hartford, and Erie railroad which was later reincorporated as the New York and New England Railroad. His journals show how fully every interval between these public works was improved. He was skilled in all family, horticultural, and agricultural labors, and his pen was ever busy in his own affairs, or for the service of friends.
