= Baldwin, Maine =

Town in Maine, United States

- Town
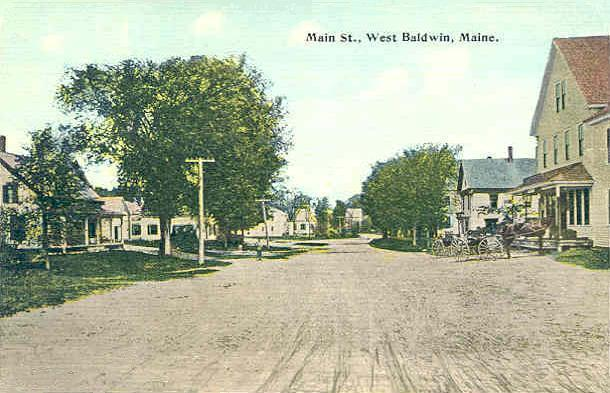
- Pequawket Trail c. 1906

- Seal

- Location in Cumberland County and the state of Maine.
- Coordinates: 43°50′38″N 70°45′02″W
- Country: United States
- State: Maine
- County: Cumberland
- Incorporated: 1802
- Named for: Loammi Baldwin
- Villages: Cornish Station; East Baldwin; North Baldwin; West Baldwin

Area
  - Total: 36.35 sq mi (94.15 km^{2})
  - Land: 35.32 sq mi (91.48 km^{2})
  - Water: 1.03 sq mi (2.67 km^{2})
- Elevation: 627 ft (191 m)

Population (2020)
  - Total: 1,520
  - Density: 43/sq mi (16.6/km^{2})
- Time zone: UTC-5 (Eastern (EST))
  - Summer (DST): UTC-4 (EDT)
- ZIP Codes: 04024 (East Baldwin); 04091 (West Baldwin)
- Area code: 207
- FIPS code: 23-02655
- GNIS feature ID: 582338
- Website: www.baldwinmaine.org

Baldwin is a town in Cumberland County, Maine, United States. The population was 1,520 at the 2020 census. It is part of the Portland-South Portland-Biddeford metropolitan area.

== History ==
First called Flintstown Plantation, it was granted in 1774 by the Massachusetts General Court to survivors of the Concord, Massachusetts, company commanded by Captain John Flint. It replaced a grant of about 1735 which gave them Township No. 3, because when state borders were adjusted in 1741, the town turned out to be in New Hampshire—present-day Walpole. On June 23, 1802, Flintstown was incorporated as Baldwin, named for Colonel Loammi Baldwin, for whom the Baldwin apple was named. Sebago was set off and incorporated in 1826.

The surface of the town is broken, but with soil favorable to grain and hay. Baldwin would be noted for its orchards, and a factory was established in East Baldwin for drying apples. There was also a corn factory. Brooks provided water power for various mills which produced board lumber, barrel staves and shooks. During times of drought, the Saco Water Power Company could regulate water at Great Falls to run mills down the Saco River in Saco and in Biddeford. The Portland and Ogdensburg Railroad followed the Saco River valley for the length of Baldwin.

== Geography ==
According to the United States Census Bureau, the town has a total area of 36.35 square miles (94.15 km^{2}), of which 35.32 square miles (91.48 km^{2}) is land and 1.03 square miles (2.67 km^{2}) is water. Baldwin is drained by Breakneck Brook and the Saco River.

The town is crossed by state routes 5, 107, 113 and 117, and is bordered by Sebago on the north; Standish on the east; Hiram on the west; and Cornish and Limington on the south.

== Demographics ==
Historical population
Census	Pop.	Note	%±
1790	190		—
1800	370		94.7%
1810	546		47.6%
1820	1,120		105.1%
1830	947		−15.4%
1840	1,134		19.7%
1850	1,100		−3.0%
1860	1,227		11.5%
1870	1,101		−10.3%
1880	1,123		2.0%
1890	932		−17.0%
1900	821		−11.9%
1910	791		−3.7%
1920	700		−11.5%
1930	694		−0.9%
1940	721		3.9%
1950	725		0.6%
1960	773		6.6%
1970	878		13.6%
1980	1,140		29.8%
1990	1,219		6.9%
2000	1,290		5.8%
2010	1,525		18.2%
2020	1,520		−0.3%
U.S. Decennial Census

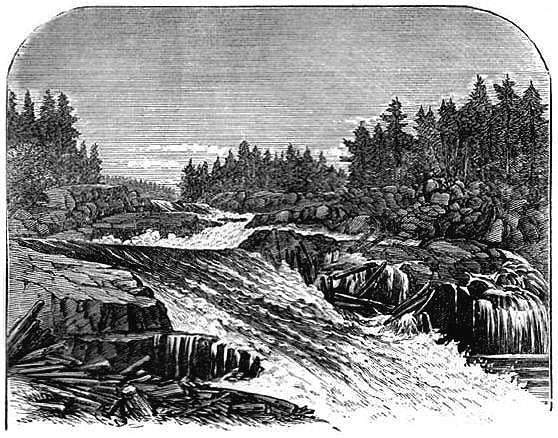
Great Falls in 1869

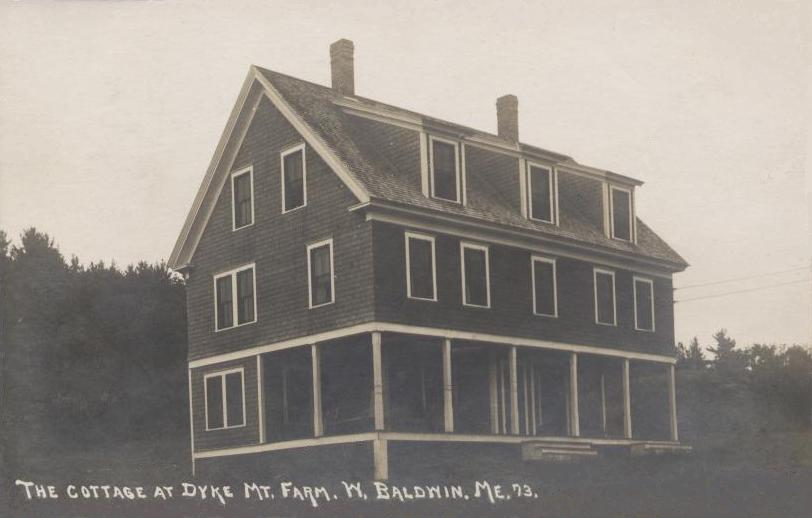
Dyke Mtn. Farm in 1919

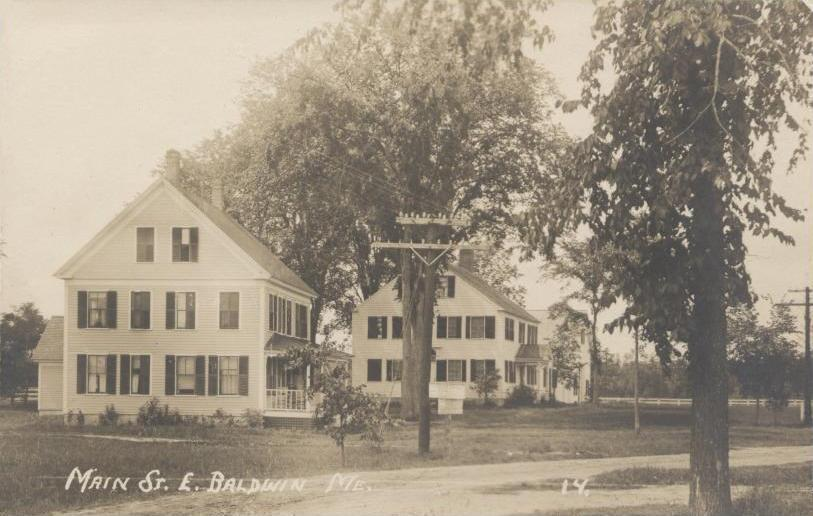
East Baldwin c. 1915

=== 2010 census ===
As of the census of 2010, there were 1,525 people, 588 households, and 431 families living in the town. The population density was 43.2 inhabitants per square mile (16.7/km^{2}). There were 700 housing units at an average density of 19.8 per square mile (7.6/km^{2}). The racial makeup of the town was 97.9% White, 0.1% African American, 0.2% Native American, 1.1% Asian, 0.3% from other races, and 0.5% from two or more races. Hispanic or Latino of any race were 0.4% of the population.

There were 588 households, of which 31.6% had children under the age of 18 living with them, 60.7% were married couples living together, 7.7% had a female householder with no husband present, 4.9% had a male householder with no wife present, and 26.7% were non-families. 19.7% of all households were made up of individuals, and 9% had someone living alone who was 65 years of age or older. The average household size was 2.59 and the average family size was 2.98.

The median age in the town was 42.4 years. 22.4% of residents were under the age of 18; 6.5% were between the ages of 18 and 24; 24.6% were from 25 to 44; 32.3% were from 45 to 64; and 14.4% were 65 years of age or older. The gender makeup of the town was 49.0% male and 51.0% female.

=== 2000 census ===
As of the census of 2000, there were 1,290 people, 493 households, and 385 families living in the town. The population density was 36.5 inhabitants per square mile (14.1/km^{2}). There were 577 housing units at an average density of 16.3 per square mile (6.3/km^{2}). The racial makeup of the town was 98.91% White, 0.31% African American, 0.16% Native American, 0.31% Asian, 0.08% Pacific Islander, and 0.23% from two or more races. Hispanic or Latino of any race were 0.47% of the population.

There were 493 households, out of which 31.6% had children under the age of 18 living with them, 65.1% were married couples living together, 7.5% had a female householder with no husband present, and 21.9% were non-families. 16.0% of all households were made up of individuals, and 6.7% had someone living alone who was 65 years of age or older. The average household size was 2.62 and the average family size was 2.89.

In the town, the population was spread out, with 24.2% under the age of 18, 5.3% from 18 to 24, 30.8% from 25 to 44, 24.8% from 45 to 64, and 14.9% who were 65 years of age or older. The median age was 39 years. For every 100 females, there were 96.0 males. For every 100 females age 18 and over, there were 99.6 males.

The median income for a household in the town was $36,500, and the median income for a family was $38,750. Males had a median income of $31,667 versus $21,563 for females. The per capita income for the town was $15,689. About 8.2% of families and 11.2% of the population were below the poverty line, including 13.9% of those under age 18 and 9.5% of those age 65 or over.

== Local schools ==
- Sacopee Valley Middle School
- Sacopee Valley High School

== Notable people ==
- Andrew Clements, author of children's literature
- Philip Cresey Jr., politician
- Isaac W. Dyer, US District Attorney
- Josiah Pierce, president of the Maine Senate
- Ledell Titcomb, baseball player
