= Cyrus Baldwin (engineer) =

American civil engineer

Cyrus Baldwin (June 22, 1773 – June 23, 1854) was one of the five sons of Loammi Baldwin of Woburn, Massachusetts, USA. Baldwin was the agent for the Middlesex Canal after having taken part in the survey work with his father and brothers. He also served as the inspector and sealer of gunpowder at Hale's in Lowell Massachusetts where he resided. Cyrus and his wife Elizabeth Varnum had one child who died at a young age.

== Civil engineering family ==
Like his brothers, Benjamin Franklin Baldwin (1777–1821), Loammi Baldwin Jr. (1780–1834), James Fowle Baldwin (1782–1862), and George Rumford Baldwin, he followed in his father's footsteps, working as a civil engineer for various canal and later railroad companies. Cyrus and his brother Benjamin were responsible for surveying the Merrimack River in 1818 for the purpose of making navigational improvements.
