= First Burial Ground =

First Burial Ground is the place name of various places:

- First Burial Ground, New London, Connecticut
- First Burial Ground (Woburn, Massachusetts)
