= Philip Cresey Jr. =

American politician

Philip A. Cresey Jr. is an American politician from Maine. A Republican from Baldwin, Maine, Cresey served 4 terms (2000–2007) in the Maine House of Representatives.

Cresey was known for his criticism of then Governor Angus King's proposal to give every middle school student in Maine a laptop for school use. Cresey worked with Rep. Brian Duprey to break Maine's contract with Apple Computer and stop the laptop program.
