= James Fowle Baldwin =

American engineer (1782–1862)

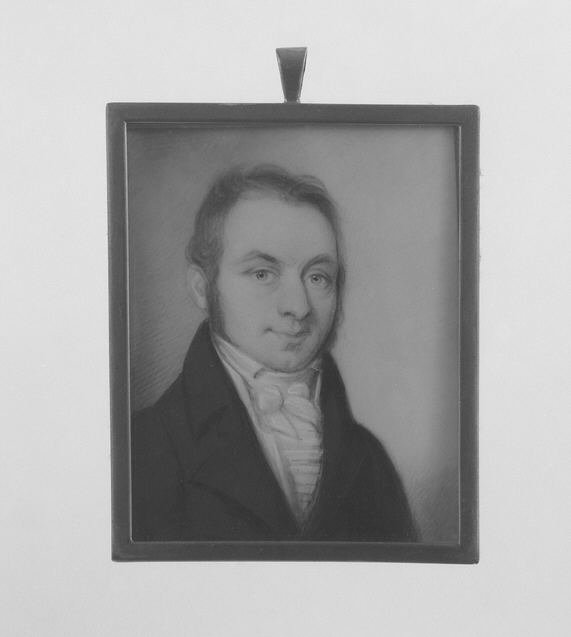
- Born: April 29, 1782; Woburn
- Died: May 20, 1862; Boston
- Occupation: Civil engineer
- Father: Loammi Baldwin
- Relatives: Benjamin Franklin Baldwin, George Rumford Baldwin, Loammi Baldwin Jr., Cyrus Baldwin

James Fowle Baldwin (April 29, 1782 – May 20, 1862) was an early American civil engineer who worked with his father and brothers on the Middlesex Canal, surveyed and designed the Boston and Lowell Railroad and the Boston and Albany Railroad, the first Boston water supply from Lake Cochituate, and many other early engineering projects. He was the first president of the Boston Society of Civil Engineers and served one term as a Senator from Suffolk County to the Massachusetts Senate, then served as a Boston Water Commissioner.

== Family life and education ==
James Fowle Baldwin was born in Woburn and died in Boston aged eighty. He married July 28, 1818, Sarah Parsons, daughter of Samuel and Sarah (Parsons) Pitkin, of East Hartford, Connecticut. They had three sons all of whom died in childhood. One at the age of eight in 1829; and the two others of typhus fever in 1834, at the ages of fifteen and six years.

James was the fourth son of Loammi Baldwin Sr., and received his early education in the schools of his native Woburn and in the academies at Billerica and Westford. About 1803 he was in Boston acquiring a mercantile education. He was later established there as a merchant; but the influence of his early association with the engineering faculties of the older members of his own family turned his attention in that direction.

== Engineering career ==
He joined his brother Loammi Baldwin Jr. in the construction of the Boston Navy Yard dry dock at Charlestown. In 1827 he, with two others, were appointed commissioners to make the survey for a railroad to the western part of the state, this being then a new and untried enterprise, and the survey was made from Springfield to Albany. Upon this work he was engaged for more than two years. It was not prosecuted at the time, but subsequently the Western railroad, so called, was built upon the location selected by him and his plans were generally adopted. He always looked upon this, next to the introduction of pure water into Boston, as the most important of his professional works.

In 1832 he began the location of the Boston and Lowell Railroad, which was constructed under his superintendence. He was also employed in engineering lines by the Ware Manufacturing company, the Thames company of Norwich, and the proprietors of the locks and canals at Lowell. He also determined the relative amount of water power used by the mills of the different companies at Lowell. He was elected a Fellow of the American Academy of Arts and Sciences in 1841.

In 1825 the subject of the water supply of Boston attracted the attention of the authorities, and an investigation of the sources for a pure supply was made, and in 1837 he was appointed on a commission to inquire still further into the matter. He dissented from the majority in the recommendation of Spot and Mystic ponds, and recommended Long Pond (Lake Cochituate). Others high in authority differed from his conclusion, but still he was immovable in adherence to his recommendation, in spite of rejection by popular vote, to which it had been submitted, and it was not renewed till 1844, when he was again in a position of influence on the commission. His plan was, however, adopted March 30, 1846; the plan was presented and read before that society, and soon after published in its Transactions. The ground was broken five months after, and on October 25. 1848, he had the pleasure of seeing his plan, so long resisted, finally triumphant, and the public fountain playing for the first time in the presence of a large concourse of people. He was for several years a senator from Suffolk in the Massachusetts general court, and the first president of the Boston Society of Civil Engineers.

== Legacy ==
The Boston Daily Advertiser wrote, in Baldwin's obituary, "He was of a kindly and benevolent disposition, affable in his manners, warm and unfaltering in his attachment to his friends. His sense of justice and his fair appreciation of the rights of others showed to great advantage in many of his public works."

A memoir of Baldwin, by Usher Parsons, was published in 1865. From this memoir are gleaned the following tributes: "He was a gentleman of highly respectable attainments, and surpassed by none as a scientific and practical engineer. He was employed by the State to superintend the construction of its gigantic public works. He was a prominent member of the American Academy of Arts and Sciences, and during many years held the position in that learned society in the section of Technology and Civil Engineering."
