= Isaac W. Dyer =

American politician (1855–1937)

Isaac Watson Dyer (September 13, 1855 – February 13, 1937) was a Maine lawyer and politician. Dyer was born in Baldwin, rural Cumberland County, Maine to Isaac and Martha Osgood (Porter). He earned his B.A. from Bowdoin College in 1878 and also graduated from Harvard Law School. He married in 1887 and practiced law in Portland, Maine. He served as U.S. District Attorney for Maine from 1890 to 1894 and from 1898 to 1906. A Republican, Dyer represented his hometown of Baldwin in the Maine House of Representatives.
