= Benjamin Franklin Baldwin =

American civil engineer (1777–1821)

Benjamin Franklin Baldwin (December 15, 1777 – October 11, 1821) was one of the five sons of Loammi Baldwin of Woburn, Massachusetts.

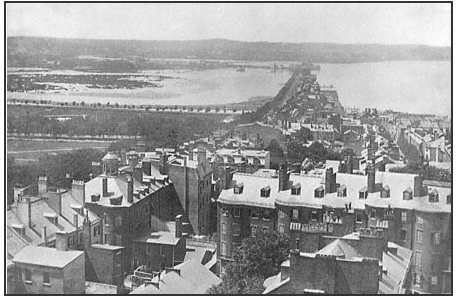
Historic photo of the Boston Mill Dam constructed under the engineering guidance of the Baldwin Family engineers

Baldwin held the office of captain in the militia from 1800 to 1805, of major from 1807 to 1811, and of lieutenant-colonel of the local regiment from 1811 to 1816. Rolls of his company of date 1802 are extant.

It is said that in addition to his other pursuits he devoted himself to the business of civil engineering, and assisted his brother in the construction of the mill dam across the Back Bay of Boston, and in other works. Benjamin and his wife Mary Carter Brewster Coolidge had five children: Mary Brewster (1809–1817), Clarissa (1810–1813), Loammi (1813–1855), Mary Brewster (1815–1854), and Clarissa Coolidge (1819–1900). His widow later married manufacturer Burrage Yale.

== Civil engineering family ==
Along with his brothers, Cyrus Baldwin (1773–1854), Loammi Baldwin Jr. (1780–1834), James Fowle Baldwin (1782–1862), and George Rumford Baldwin (1798–1888), he was a noted civil engineer, having assisted his father in conducting the original survey for the Middlesex Canal at the age of nine and assisted his brother in the construction of the mill dam across the Back Bay of Boston, among various other civil engineering achievements.

The structure was originally conceived as a means to industrialize the Back Bay but ultimately led to the creation of the Back Bay neighborhood and is considered "one of the greatest engineering accomplishments of early 19th century Boston..." Along with Cyrus Baldwin, Benjamin was also responsible for surveying the Merrimack River in 1818 for the purpose of making navigational improvements.

His grandson was Dr. Roswell Park, founder of Roswell Park Comprehensive Cancer Center.
