= Josiah Pierce =

American politician and lawyer

Member of the Maine Senate from the Gorham district
- In office 1833–1836

Personal details
- Born: August 15, 1792 Baldwin, Maine
- Died: June 25, 1866 (aged 73) Gorham, Maine
- Party: Democrat
- Spouse: Hannah Pierce
- Profession: Lawyer

Josiah Pierce (August 15, 1792 – June 25, 1866) was an American politician and judicial officer in Maine. Pierce, who was born in Baldwin, Maine, attended Bowdoin College. After graduating in 1821, he settled in Gorham, Maine and became a practicing lawyer. Known for his public speaking skills, Pierce served as Judge of Probate for Cumberland County. He also published A History of the Town of Gorham, Maine in 1862 as well as The Centennial Anniversary of the Settlement of Gorham; Volume 1.

== Politics ==
Beyond his law career, Pierce served as a town selectman for Gorham as well as serving three years in the Maine Senate. From 1835 to 1836, he was President of the Maine Senate as a Democrat. As Senate President, Pierce was paid $4 a day, double that of other senators.
