= Mystic Lakes (Boston) =

Lakes in Boston, Massachusetts

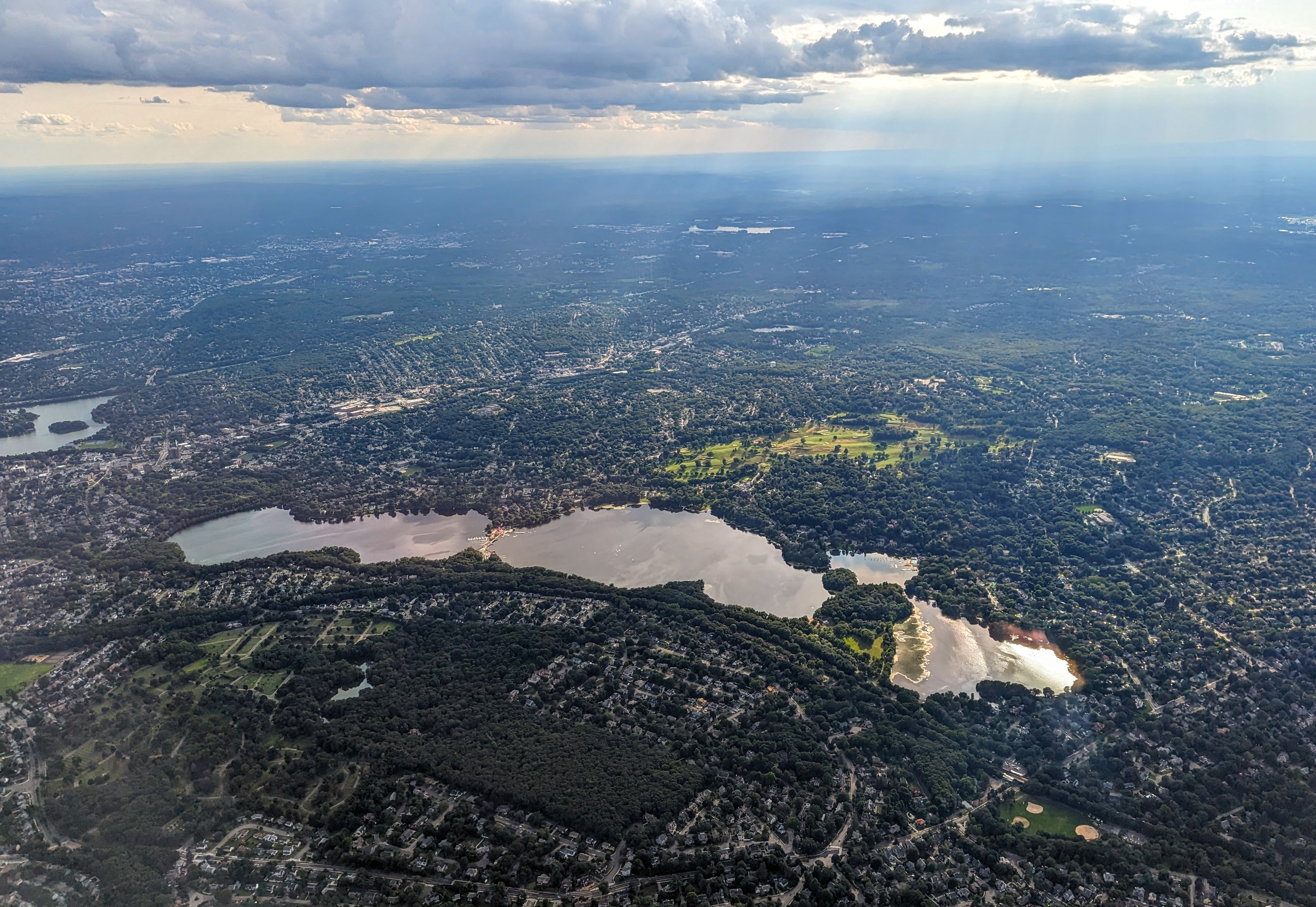
- Aerial photograph of Mystic Lakes

- Location within Massachusetts Location within the United States
- Location: Arlington, Medford, and Winchester, Massachusetts
- Coordinates: 42°25′54″N 71°8′54″W
- Type: meromictic
- Primary inflows: Aberjona River
- Primary outflows: Mystic River
- Basin countries: United States

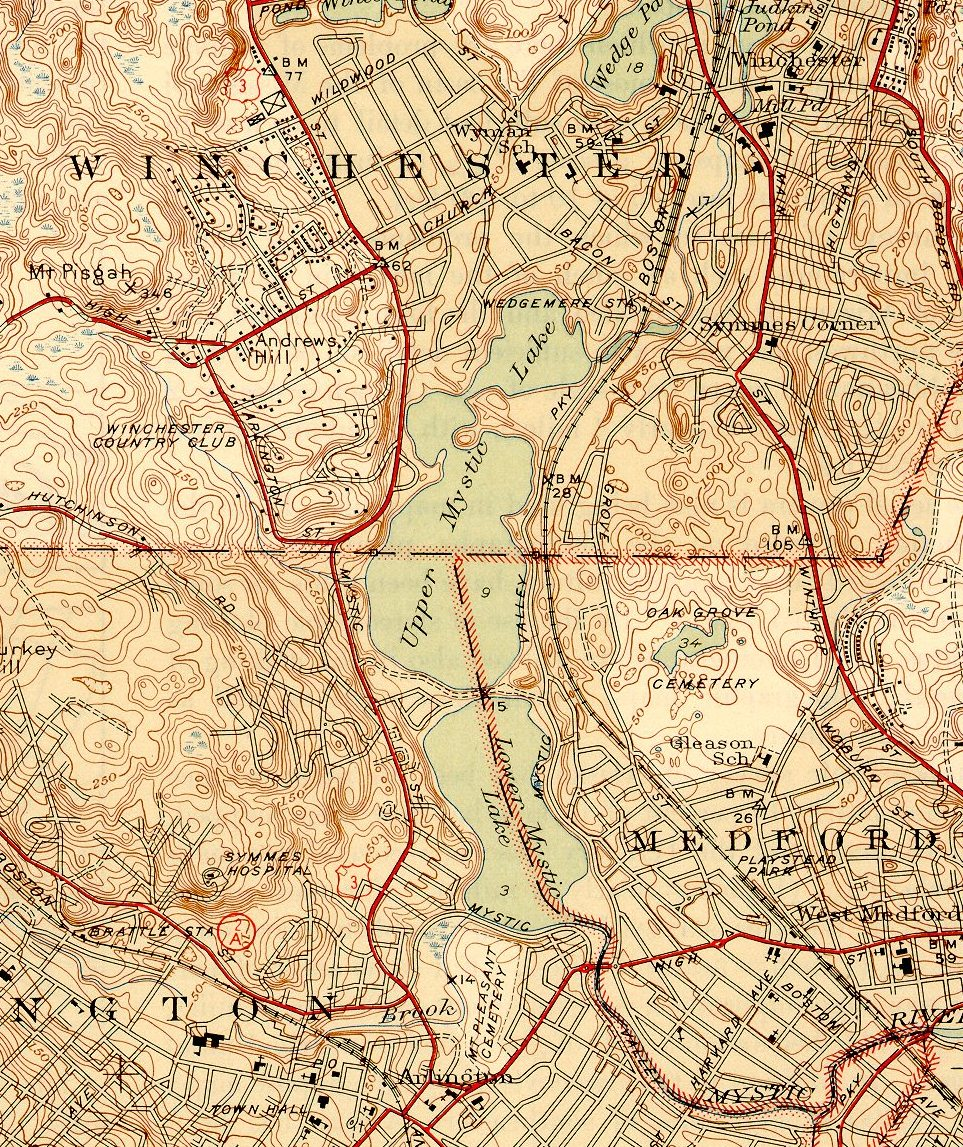
Map with Upper and Lower Mystic Lakes

The Mystic Lakes, consisting of Upper Mystic Lake and Lower Mystic Lake, are closely linked bodies of water in the northwestern suburbs of Boston, Massachusetts.

The lakes lie at an elevation of 3 feet 3 inches (1 m) above sea level, within the towns of Winchester, Arlington, and Medford, Massachusetts. Upper Mystic Lake is fed by the Aberjona River, and drains south, over the Mystic Dam, into Lower Mystic Lake, which in turn empties into the Mystic River and then Boston Harbor.

== Description ==
Lower Mystic Lake is a meromictic lake, which means that the lake has a deep layer of water that rarely, if ever, mixes with its top waters. As a consequence, the sediments at the bottom of Lower Mystic Lake accumulate in annual layers (or varves) that have been nearly undisturbed for a thousand years. Such varves in meromictic lakes preserve a historical record somewhat like tree rings do. In the case of Lower Mystic Lake, the varves have been used by Mark Besonen and his collaborators to study the historical incidence of hurricanes.

Although the Mystic Lakes are popular for swimming, sailing, and fishing, the Upper Mystic Lake suffers from contamination by arsenic and other heavy metals from the Aberjona River.

The eastern shore of the lakes is part of the Mystic River Reservation managed by the Massachusetts Department of Conservation and Recreation.

The lakes were previously part of the drinking water supply for Charlestown and later Boston (see Massachusetts Water Resources Authority).

== History ==
In the 1600s, the Squaw Sachem of Mistick, who deeded much of the land in Greater Boston to settlers, resided near the Mystics Lakes. Her Naumkeag band likely established fishing weirs at the outlet of the lake and the downstream Mystic river, and had grown corn on the lake's eastern shores. An indigenous burial site from the 1600s, possibly of sachems Nanepashemet or Montowompate, was discovered in 1862 just east of the Mystic lakes and was memorialized as Sagamore Park.

From 1803 to 1851, the Middlesex Canal, a progenitor to the Erie Canal, operated on the eastern shore of the Mystic Lakes, connecting Lowell to Charlestown.
