= Aberjona River =

Coordinates: 42°29′17″N 71°7′24″W

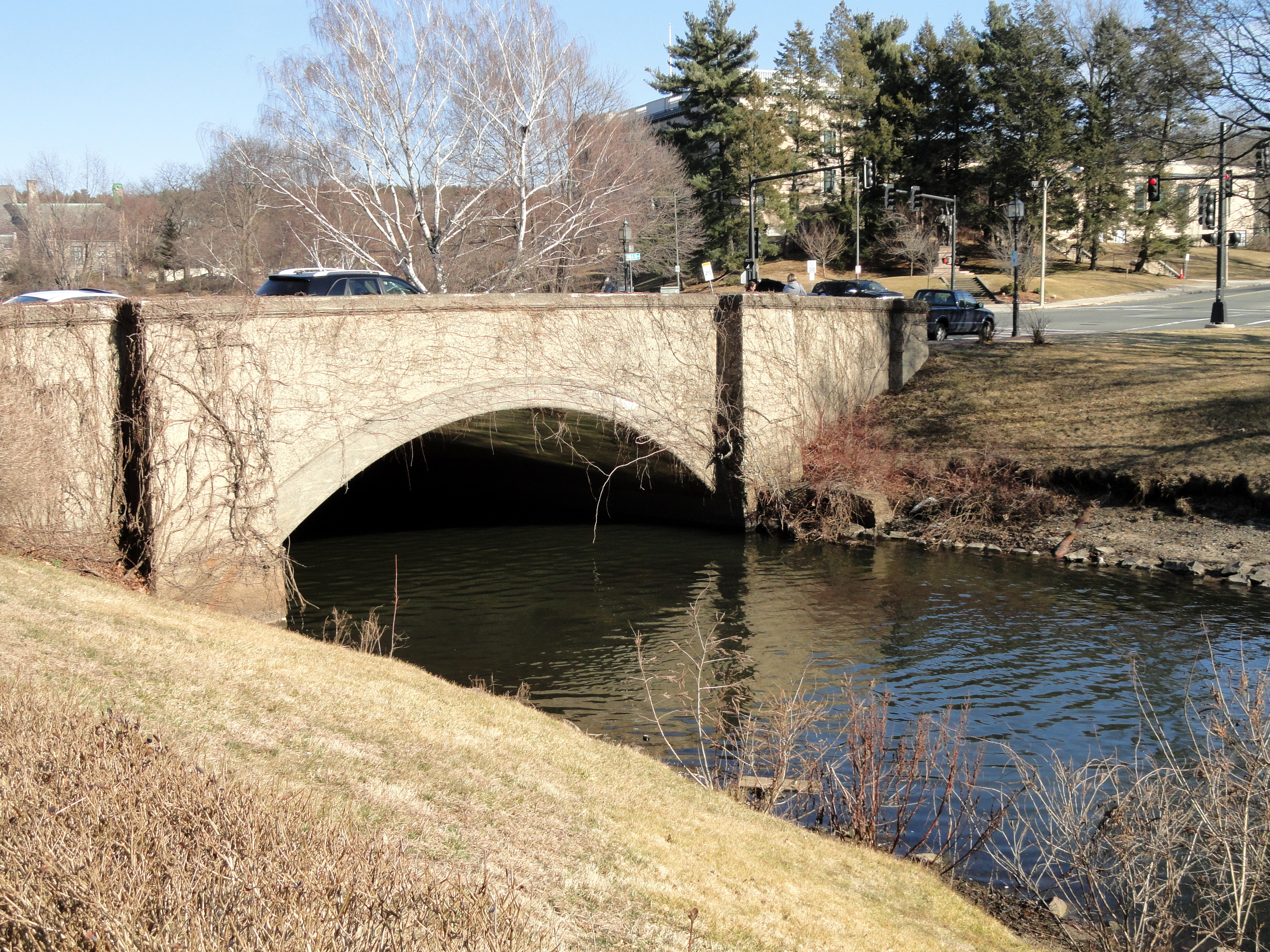
- The river just below the Mill Pond in Winchester center

Location
- Country: United States

Physical characteristics
- Mouth
  - location: Mystic Lakes
  - elevation: 7 ft (2.1 m)
- Basin size: 25 mi^{2} (65 km^{2})

The Aberjona River (A-bər-JOH-nə) is a 9.3-mile-long (15.0 km), heavily urbanized river in the northwestern suburbs of Boston, Massachusetts. The name is from the Natick language and means "junction or confluence".

The river rises in Reading, flows roughly south through Woburn and Winchester, and empties into the Mystic Lakes. It is generally small and heavily channelized, often running through underground culverts, but is quite apparent in Winchester center where it widens into Judkins Pond and the Mill Pond. The river's 25 square mile watershed covers most of Woburn and about half of Winchester, as well as portions of the surrounding communities of Lexington, Burlington, Wilmington, Reading, Wakefield, and Stoneham.

The Aberjona River was first identified by Europeans shortly after 1631, when Captain Edward Johnson explored the area. The name Aberjona appears in the earliest colonial records, but its origins are unknown. By 1865 there were 21 tanneries and currying shops in Woburn, and by the 1870s pollution from tanneries in Woburn and Winchester was affecting both the river and the Upper Mystic Lake (then a public water supply). The Massachusetts Legislature banned the discharge of wastes into Horn Pond Brook (a tributary) in 1907 and into the Aberjona in 1911.

A 1995 study by Spliethoff and Hemond analyzed sediments of the Upper Mystic Lake with industrial records, and determined that high concentrations of arsenic, cadmium, chromium, copper, lead, and zinc were deposited by chemical and leather industries dating from the early 1900s.

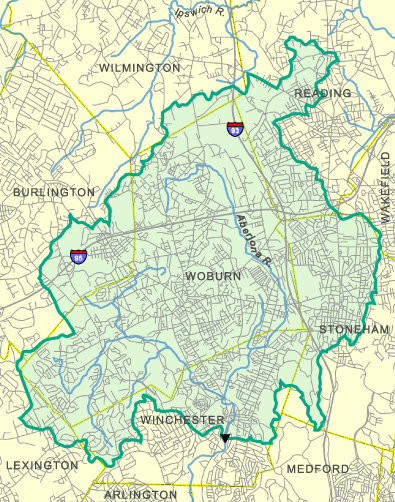
USGS map of the river's watershed area

In the 1995 bestseller A Civil Action (and 1998 film starring John Travolta), a 15 acres (6.1 ha) parcel of forest, field, and marshland on the banks of the Aberjona River is recalled by witnesses as the place where workers from abutting industrial plants (owned by W.R. Grace & Co. and Beatrice Foods) dumped trichloroethylene (TCE) and other toxic chemicals into trenches, or "swimming pools", "within a few inches of the water." At one time, the Aberjona River had "run clear and full of fish."

From 1969 into the early 1980s, the Industri-plex site was developed along the river due to its proximity to the I-93 / I-95 junction. Industri-plex manufacturing plants contributed to the area's extensive contamination with chemicals used by the local paper, textile and leather industries, including lead-arsenic insecticides, acetic acid, benzene and toluene, and sulfuric acid. Industri-plex is now a "superfund" site, although substantially remediated.

== Notes ==
- Harr, Jonathan (1995), A Civil Action, Vintage Press, pages 11–13; 18; 185–193
- USGS Aberjona River project
- EPA Aberjona River project
- NOAA Aberjona River photographs
- Mystic River Watershed Association
- Henry M. Spliethoff and Harold F. Hemond, "History of Toxic Metal Discharge to Surface Waters of the Aberjona Watershed", Environmental Science & Technology doi:10.1021/es950169q
