= Baldwin (apple) =

Apple cultivar

Coordinates: 42.5329°N 71.1760°W

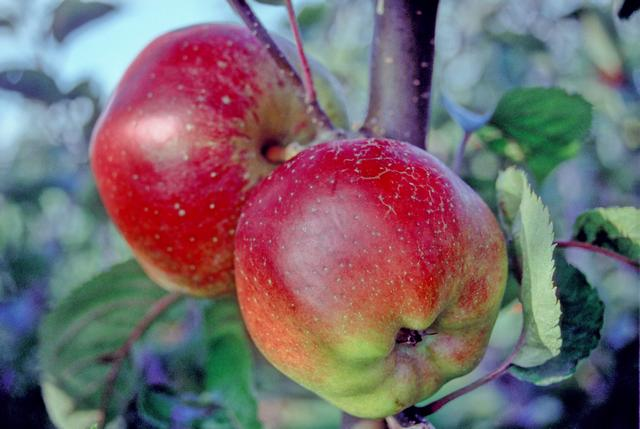
- Hybrid parentage: Chance seedling
- Cultivar: Baldwin
- Origin: (United States) Wilmington, Massachusetts, after 1740

The Baldwin apple is a bright red winter apple, very good in quality, and easily shipped. During the nineteenth century, it was the most popular apple in New England. No apple in the vicinity of Boston was so popular as Baldwin. It has also been known as Calville Butter, Felch, Late Baldwin, Pecker, Red Baldwin's Pippin, Steele's Red Winter, and Woodpecker.

The Baldwin was one of four apples honored by the United States Postal Service in a 2013 set of four 33¢ stamps commemorating historic strains, joined by Northern Spy, Golden Delicious, and Granny Smith.

== History ==
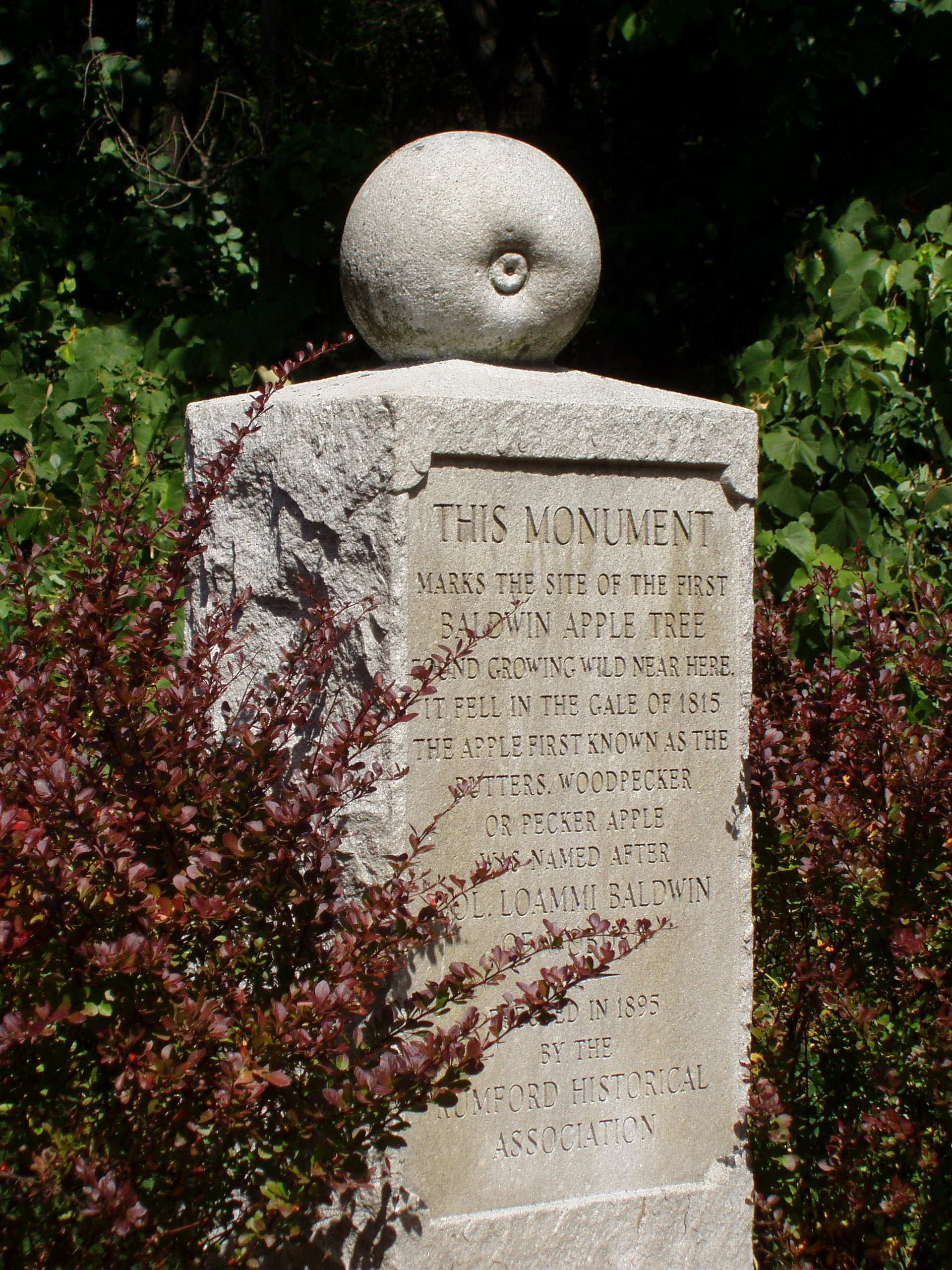
Monument to Baldwin Apple at site of discovery (Wilmington, Massachusetts)

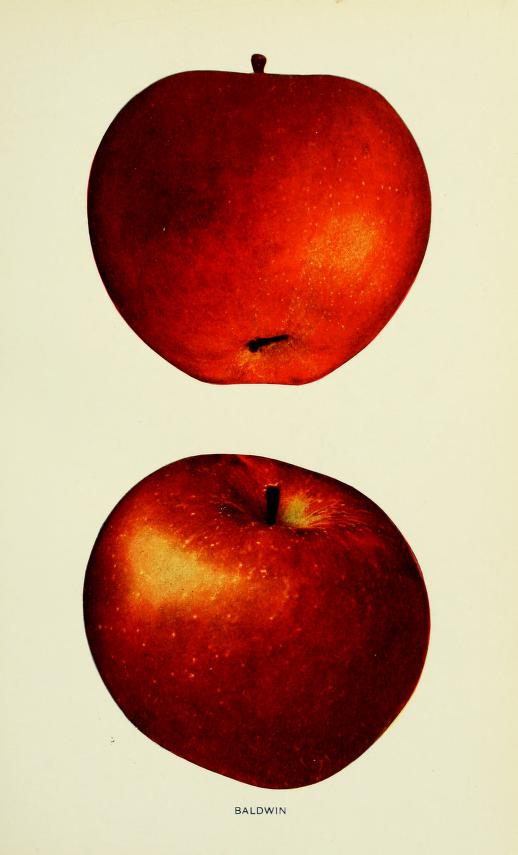
Plate from the 1903 Apples of New York

According to local tradition, the apple was found near Wood Hill by William Butters (1711-1784), grandson of Will Butter, first white settler in what is now Wilmington, Massachusetts. William Butters raised the tree in his yard on the Butters Farm, near the present Baldwin Apple Monument (pictured).

According to S. A. Beach's Apples of New York, the Baldwin originated soon after 1740 as a chance seedling on the farm of Mr. John Ball of Wilmington, Massachusetts, and for about 40 years thereafter its cultivation was confined to that immediate neighborhood. The farm later came into the possession of a Mr. Butters, who gave the name Woodpecker to the apple because the tree was frequented by woodpeckers. Deacon Samuel Thompson, a surveyor of Woburn, Massachusetts, brought it to the attention of Col. Loammi Baldwin, who propagated it and more widely introduced it in eastern Massachusetts. From Col. Baldwin's interest in the variety it came to be called the Baldwin.

A monument to the Baldwin apple now stands on today's Chestnut street in Wilmington. The monument's inscription reads: This monument marks the site of the first Baldwin Apple Tree found growing wild near here. It fell in the gale of 1815. The apple first known as the Butters, Woodpecker or Pecker apple was named after Col. Loammi Baldwin of Woburn. Erected in 1895 by the Rumford Historical Association.

A harsh winter in 1934 wiped out many of the Baldwin apple orchards in New England. Baldwin apple trees were replaced by the more resilient and annual-bearing McIntosh. Its popularity as an eating apple waned, but some orchards were preserved for many years because of its desirability as a mixing apple for cider. However, the orchards have not been replaced when they played out. Baldwin Apples, unlike many apples, have long been prized for the making of hard cider. "West County Cider" makes Baldwin Cider from trees planted in the early 1900s. It is their most popular cider. Typical size width 81-89 mm, height 63-79 mm, stalk 19-22 mm. It is an exceptionally hard apple and would remain remarkably free from blemishes and other blights with few pesticides being needed. Because of its hardness it shipped well without bruising and for a time was prized for this quality. Aside from cider making it was also known as an exceptionally good pie apple and due to its inherent hardness would maintain more crispness through the baking process than other apples would.

Essex County, New Jersey, in the time of the Dutch, was also well known for its apple groves and cider, connected with the Bauldwin family. (John Sr. & Jr., signers of the Newark Agreement,~1667, per Arny in Red Lion Rampant)

== Today ==
Baldwins were once the most popular apples in the United States, but have largely fallen out of existence with the introduction of the Red Delicious. While not extinct, they are very difficult to find in stores. Some trees can still be found wild in abandoned orchards in New England, notably in Vermont.
