= Loammi Baldwin =

American engineer and soldier (1744–1807)

Loammi Baldwin FAAAS
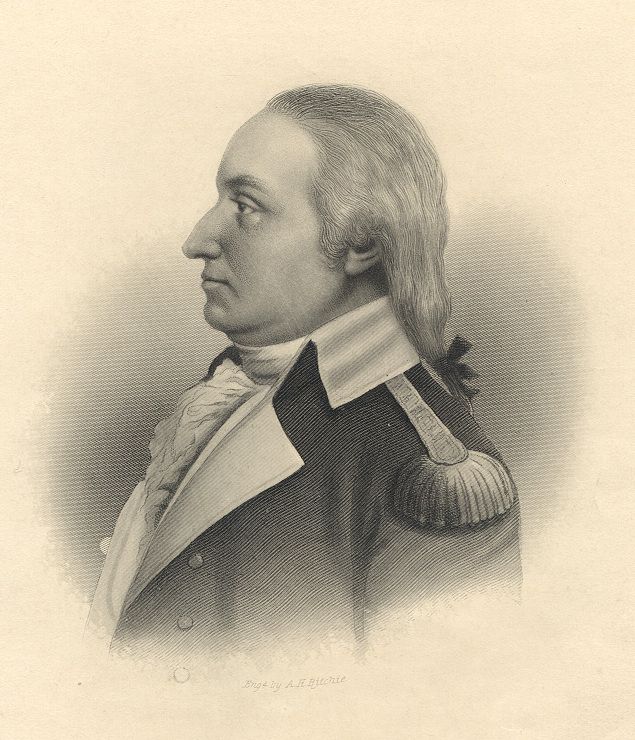
- Born: January 21, 1745 [O.S. January 10, 1744] Woburn, Massachusetts, U.S.
- Died: October 20, 1807 (aged 63); Woburn, Massachusetts, U.S.
- Education: Harvard College
- Occupations: Engineer, politician, and soldier
- Known for: Father of American Civil Engineering
- Notable work: Middlesex Canal, Baldwin apple
- Children: 6, including Cyrus, Benjamin, Loammi Jr., James, and George

Colonel Loammi Baldwin (January 21, 1745 [O.S. January 10, 1744] – October 20, 1807) was a noted American engineer, politician, and a soldier in the American Revolutionary War.

He is known as one of the earliest American civil engineers. His son, Loammi Jr., has been called "the Father of Civil Engineering in America" by the Charlestown Historical Society, though similar titles have also been applied to others, such as Benjamin Wright. Baldwin's five sons, Cyrus Baldwin (1773–1854), Benjamin Franklin Baldwin (1777–1821), Loammi Baldwin Jr. (1780–1838), James Fowle Baldwin (1782–1862), and George Rumford Baldwin (1798–1888), were also well-known engineers. He surveyed and was responsible for the construction of the Middlesex Canal, but today he is perhaps best remembered for the Baldwin apple which he developed at his farm, or rather he recognized its potential and propagated it throughout the northeast. The apple had been discovered on the farm of John Ball in Wilmington, Massachusetts, around 1750, and named Woodpecker by a later owner of the farm. Colonel Baldwin's promotion of the apple occurred after 1784. He was also a surveyor and plantation co-owner in Hartford, Maine, which at that time was known as East Butterfield.

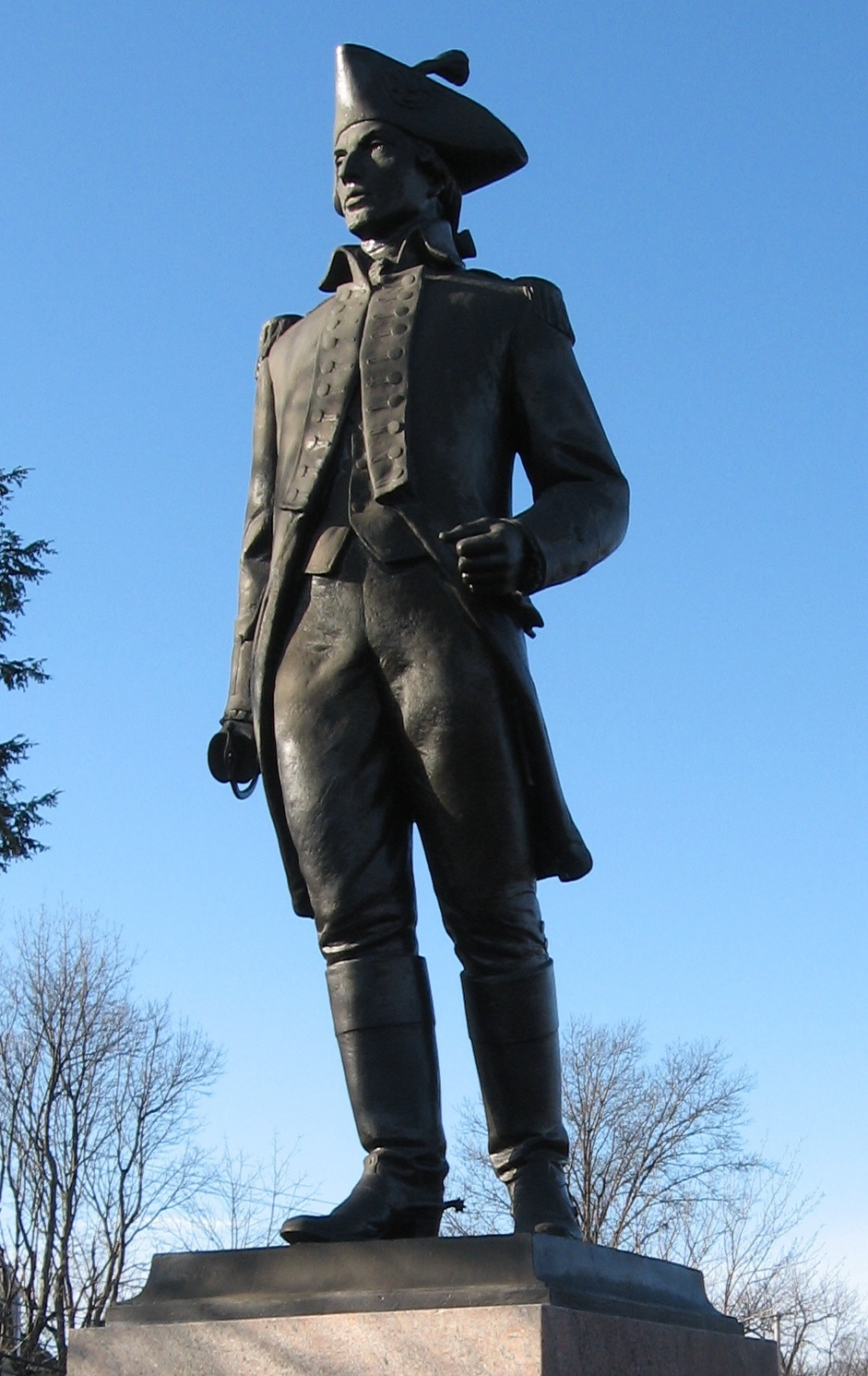
A statue of Loammi Baldwin in Woburn, Massachusetts, which was repaired in the fall of 2007 to replace the missing sword.

== Education ==
Baldwin attended grammar school in Woburn, Massachusetts. Later he would walk from North Woburn to Cambridge with his younger friend and childhood neighbor, Benjamin Thompson, later Count Rumford, to attend the lectures of Professor John Winthrop at Harvard College. He and Thompson performed their own experiments at home. Baldwin received a Master of Arts degree from Harvard in 1785.

== Military career ==
In 1774, Baldwin enlisted in a regiment, and commanded the Woburn militia at the Battle of Lexington and Concord as a major. He is recorded as having described the events of April 19, 1775, as follows "We mustered as fast as possible. The Town turned out extraordinary, and proceeded toward Lexington." As a major at the time he continues "I rode along a little before the main body, and when I was nigh Jacob Reed's (at present Durenville) I heard a great firing; proceeded on, soon heard that the Regulars had fired upon Lexington people and killed a large number of them. We proceeded on as fast as possible and came to Lexington and saw about eight or ten dead and numbers wounded." He then, with the rest from Woburn, proceeded to Concord by way of Lincoln meeting house, ascended a hill there, and rested and refreshed themselves a little.

Then follows a particular account of the action and of his own experience. He had "several good shots," and proceeded on till coming between the meeting-house and Buckman's tavern at Lexington, with a prisoner before him, the cannon of the British began to play, the balls flying near him, and for safety he retreated behind the meeting-house, when a ball came through near his head, and he further retreated to a meadow north of the house and lay there and heard the balls in the air and saw them strike the ground. Woburn sent to the field on that day, one hundred and eighty men. At the beginning of the war, he enlisted in the 26th Continental Regiment commanded by Colonel Samuel Gerrish. Here he rapidly advanced to be lieutenant-colonel, and upon Colonel Gerrish's retirement in August 1775, he was placed in command of the regiment, and was soon commissioned colonel.

Until the end of 1775, Baldwin and his men remained near Boston, but in April 1776, he was ordered with his command to New York City. He took part in the Battle of Pell's Point on October 18, 1776. On the night of December 25–26, in the face of a violent and extremely cold storm of snow and hail, General Washington and his army crossed the Delaware to the New Jersey side, and fought the Battle of Trenton on the morning of December 26. Baldwin and his regiment participated in both the crossing and the fight. In 1777, Baldwin resigned from the army because of ill health.

== Political career ==
Baldwin was elected to various public offices between 1780 and 1796. He was appointed high sheriff of Middlesex County in 1780, and was the first to hold office after the adoption of the state constitution. From 1778 to 1784, he represented Woburn in the Massachusetts General Court. He ran in six elections for the U.S. House of Representatives: in 1788 for the 3rd congressional district, in 1794, 1796, and 1798 for the 10th congressional district, and in 1810 and the 1811 special election for the 4th congressional district; in 1794, he obtained all but one of the 41 votes cast in Woburn.

== Engineering career ==
Baldwin began work with his older sons on the Middlesex Canal in 1794 and after nine years, the canal began service in 1803. He later worked on Boston's fortifications. His son Cyrus continued his father's work on the Middlesex Canal as an agent for the canal company. His son Benjamin worked on the Boston Mill Dam until his early death at the age of 43.

== Other ==
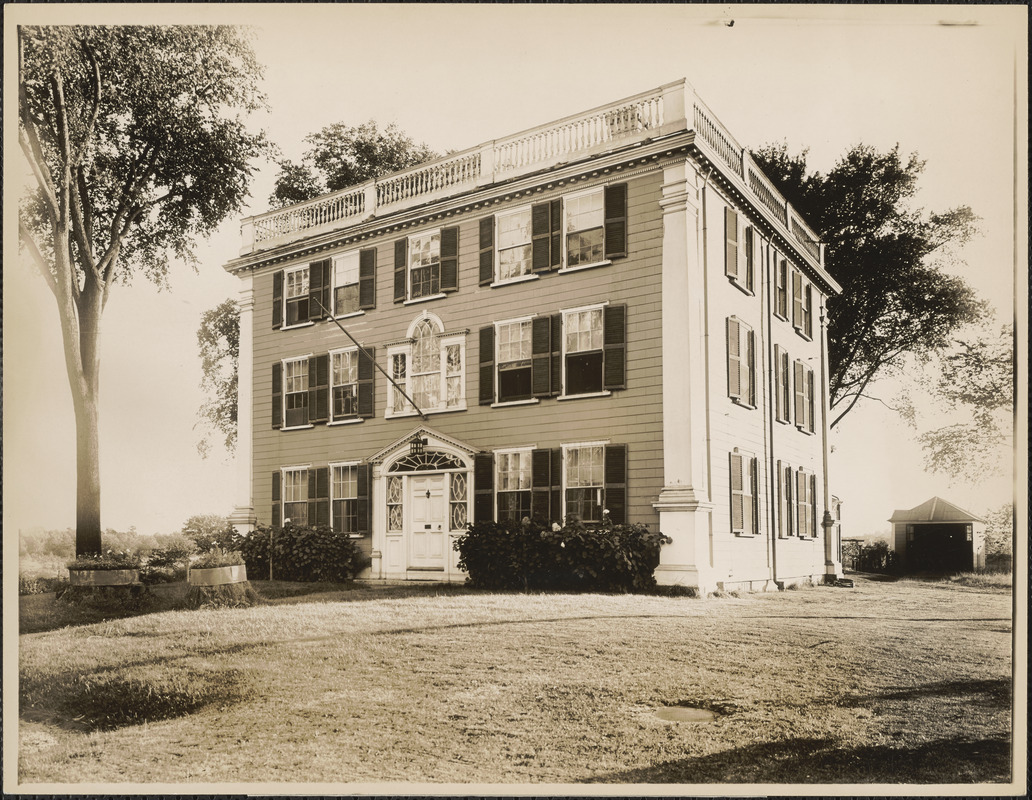
Loammi Baldwin Mansion, Elm Street (at corner of Main Street), Woburn, Mass

Baldwin was elected a Fellow of the American Academy of Arts and Sciences in 1782. He opposed Shays' Rebellion. His published work as a member of the AAAS included early experiments with electricity "An account of a Curious Appearance of the Electrical Fluid," (Memoirs Am. Acad. Vol. 1, 1785, pp. 257–259); and "Observations on Electricity and an Improved Mode of Constructing Lightning Rods," (Memoirs, Vol. 2, pt. 2, 1804, pp. 96–104).

The first paper was written in 1783, and the "curious appearance" described was produced by raising an electrical kite at the time of a thunder shower. The experiments, however, were tried in July 1771. At that time the author mentions that there stood some lofty trees near his house, and also a shop near by it. His parents, family, and neighbors witnessed the "electrical effect" he succeeded in producing. The date of preparing the second article was January 25, 1797.

His Baldwin House home—originally built in 1660 and expanded in the 1800s—still stands in Woburn and is currently in use as a Chinese restaurant.

== Family ==
Baldwin married July 9, 1772, Mary Fowle (died 1786 age 39) daughter of James Fowle Jr. and Mary Reed, and had four sons. He married again, May 26, 1791, Margaret Fowle (1747–1799), daughter of Josiah and Margery Carter, and had a son and a daughter.

Howard Means in Johnny Appleseed: The Man, the Myth, The American Story, references Baldwin as a cousin of John Chapman (Johnny Appleseed).
