= Francesca Cappelletti =

Italian art history professor

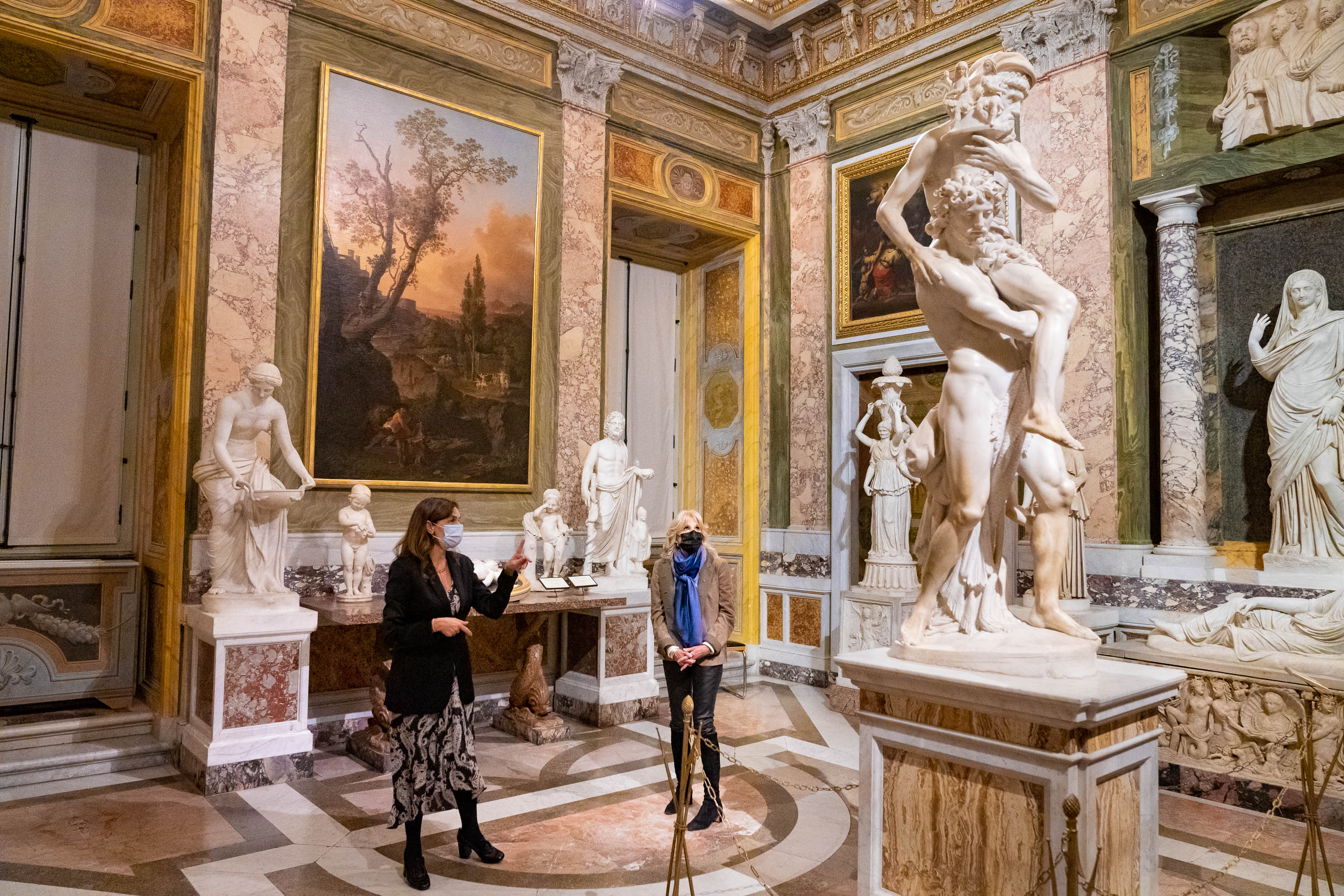
- Francesca Cappalletti (left) and First Lady Jill Biden (right) tour the Borghese Gallery in October 2021
- Born: 1964 (age 61–62)
- Education: University of Rome
- Occupation: Art historian
- Employer: Galleria Borghese

Francesca Cappelletti (born 1964) is an Italian art history professor known for verifying the authenticity of the Caravaggio painting The Taking of Christ with Laura Testa while they were students at the University of Rome.

== Education ==
Cappelletti graduated from the University of Rome and studied at the Warburg Institute in London and the Collège de France in Paris. She is a Professor of Art History at the University of Ferrara.

== Career ==
Cappelletti, along with Laura Testa, found the first recorded mention of The Taking of Christ in an ancient and decaying account book documenting the original commission and payments to Caravaggio, in the archives of the Mattei family, kept in the cellar of a palazzo in the small town of Recanati, an archive that is no longer accessible to the public. Testa and Cappelletti were working on a hunch by Caravaggio scholar Roberto Longhi that a painting attributed to Gerard van Honthorst might, in fact, be by Caravaggio. Cappelletti discovered a 1972 history of the National Gallery of Scotland's collection which discussed a bequest of 28 paintings purchased from the Mattei family by William Hamilton Nisbet, implying that the painting might be in the United Kingdom. The painting was discovered in a Jesuit community residence in the early 1990s by Sergio Benedetti and is on indefinite loan to the National Gallery of Ireland.

Cappelletti published the results of her research first in the Italian publication Arte e Dossier and then in The Burlington Magazine in 1993. The discovery of the painting and the research leading up to it became the subject of the book The Lost Painting: The Quest for a Caravaggio Masterpiece by Jonathan Harr. In it, Cappelletti is described as "a free woman within the lingering, and dwindling, constraints of a profession largely dominated by men."

== Bibliography ==
- Caravaggio and the Painters of the North (2017)
- Les Bas-fonds du baroque: La Rome du vice et de la misère (2014)
- Zurbarán (2014)
- Nuova guida alla Galleria Doria Pamphilj (1996)
