= Franco Mormando =

Historian

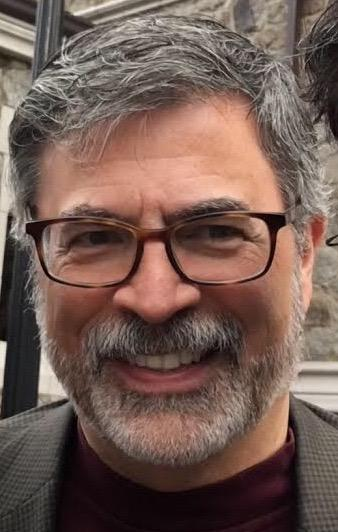
- Mormando in 2018
- Born: 17 August 1955 (age 71); New York, New York, United States
- Education: Columbia University (BA); Harvard University (PhD)
- Occupation: Historian

Franco Mormando (born 17 August 1955) is an American historian, university professor, and author, focusing on the art, literature, and religious culture of Italy from the late Medieval period to the Baroque. His principal publications have been on fifteenth-century preacher Bernardino of Siena and Baroque artist Gian Lorenzo Bernini, with other notable contributions to the study of the artist Caravaggio, the bubonic plague and Jesuit history.

== Early life and education ==
Mormando was born and raised in New York City, in Manhattan's Lower East Side, of Italian immigrant parents. His undergraduate education was at Columbia University, where he was a John Jay National Scholar, receiving his B.A. (1977) summa cum laude and Phi Beta Kappa. At Columbia, he also received the Bigongiari Award for Excellence in Italian Studies. From Columbia, he went on to Harvard University, where he received both his M.A. (1979) and Ph.D. (1983) in Italian literature, with a dissertation on The Vernacular Sermons of Bernardino of Siena, OFM (1380-1444): A Literary Analysis. While at Harvard, he received the "Travel-Study Prize for Excellence in Teaching", from the Department of Romance Languages (May 1980) and the "Certificate of Distinction in Teaching" from the University Committee on Undergraduate Education" (December 1983).

After graduating from Harvard, Mormando entered the Jesuit Order, where he furthered his education in the form of a two-year, non-degree study of philosophy (Biennio di Filosofia) at the Pontifical Gregorian University in Rome, Italy, and a five-year program at the Jesuit School of Theology at Berkeley, California, receiving a Master's of Divinity (1992) and the S.T.L. (or Licentiate of Sacred Theology, a pontifical degree) in Church History (1994). Mormando was ordained a priest in the Jesuit order but left the Society and the priesthood in 2002.

After his studies in Berkeley, Mormando obtained (July 1994) a full-time tenure-track position in the Department of Romance Languages and Literatures at Boston College, where he has been since, now at the rank of full professor, and where he also serves as the department's chairperson. He also holds an affiliate position in the university's History Department.

A popular lecturer on Italian art to general audiences, Mormando has made presentations at the Metropolitan Museum and Frick Museum of New York; Museum of Fine Arts, Boston; National Gallery of Art, Washington, D.C.; Galleria Borghese, Rome; Kimbell Art Museum, Fort Worth, Texas; Phoenix Art Museum; Istituto Italiano di Cultura (San Francisco); Italian Embassy in Washington, D.C.; and Harvard and Yale Universities.

On October 12, 2005, he was awarded the title of Cavaliere (Knight) in the honorary Order of the Star of Italy, conferred by the President of Italy in recognition of achievement in the promotion of Italian language and culture.

== Scholarly life and work ==
=== Bernardino of Siena ===
Mormando's first scholarly publication was published in 1999 by the University of Chicago Press: The Preacher's Demons: Bernardino of Siena and the Social Underworld of Early Renaissance Italy, an extensive study of the preaching campaigns of the popular Franciscan preacher Bernardino, "the voice most eagerly listened to" and "perhaps the most influential religious force" in Italy during his lifetime. A study of the preacher's vociferous and at time violent campaigns against witches, sodomites, and Jews, all seen as dangerous enemies of Christian society, Mormando's book singlehandedly overturned the prevailing image of Bernardino as a benevolent, reassuring, pacific presence in late medieval/early Renaissance Italy, in contrast to the later preacher Girolamo Savonarola. Cornell University historian Richard Trexler noted in his review of Mormando's monograph: "As is clearly shown in this well-written, thoroughly documented study, few historical figures of fifteenth-century Italy have come up smelling like roses at the hands of historians quite like the Observant Franciscan, Bernardino of Siena. But in fact, Bernardino was a rhetorical assassin, encouraging his listeners to denounce, and even to kill those who did not meet with his approval." The Preacher's Demons went on to win the prestigious Howard R. Marraro Prize for Distinguished Scholarship in Italian History, conferred (January 2001) by the American Catholic Historical Association.

=== Caravaggio ===
In the same years that he was completing The Preacher's Demons, Mormando was busy organizing at Boston College's McMullen Museum of Art a major art exhibition of Italian Baroque art, conceived by him and entitled Saints and Sinners: Caravaggio and the Baroque Image Opening in February 1999, Saints and Sinners had at its centerpiece the long-lost painting by Baroque artist, Michelangelo Merisi da Caravaggio, The Taking of Christ (Rome, 1602), discovered in a Jesuit residence in Dublin, Ireland, and subsequently given on indefinite loan to the National Gallery of Ireland. Mormando's exhibition represented the first appearance of the newly-discovered painting in North America and, as such, garnered much attention from the world press and was visited by many thousands of people in its four-month run. In addition to introducing the North American public to the painting, the aim of Saints and Sinners was to place Caravaggio within the context of early modern conventions and the traditions of religious art; in other words, while acknowledging his at times unconventional manner and maverick ways, it stressed his direct connection to the familiar tradition of religious art. Edited by Mormando, the exhibition catalog featured original scholarship by leading experts in Baroque art and culture, including one by Sergio Benedetti (the Dublin conservator who rediscovered and restored the painting) and two essays by Mormando, "Teaching the Faithful to Fly: Mary Magdalene and Peter in Baroque Italy" and "Just as your lips approach the lips of your brothers: Judas Iscariot and the Kiss of Betrayal." Both essays represent surveys and analyses of extensive primary sources to discover what Caravaggio's original audience would have been taught about these three figures of New Testament history that are featured prominently in his art.

=== The bubonic plague ===
Several years later, Mormando conceived and organized, with some of the same colleagues who put together the Saints and Sinners exhibition, another art exhibition of early modern Italian painting entitled Hope and Healing: Painting in Italy in a Time of Plague, 1500-1800 (Worcester Art Museum, April–September 2005). The exhibition aimed to illustrate the hitherto-unrecognized deep and wide presence of the bubonic plague in Old Master Italian painting, as well as the civic role of art in a time of the pandemic. The exhibition's catalog features essays by some of the leading scholars of the history of bubonic plague in Europe, including a long introduction by Mormando based on an extensive survey of primary sources, "Response to the Plague in Early Modern Italy: What the Primary Sources, Printed and Painted, Reveal." The exhibition was followed by a later companion volume, co-edited by Mormando, Piety and Plague: From Byzantium and the Baroque (Kirksville, MO: Truman State University Press, 2007), which extended the chronological and thematic breadth of the exhibition. Mormando's contribution to the volume was a seventy-five-page essay, "Pestilence, Apostasy, and Heresy in Seventeenth-Century Rome: Deciphering Michael Sweerts' Plague in an Ancient City", in which he offers for the first time in the scholarship on that Flemish painter an answer to the long-standing question: What is the real subject of Sweerts's mysterious painting?

=== Gian Lorenzo Bernini ===
In the most recent phase of his evolving scholarly interests and publication, Mormando has turned his attention to the leading artist of Roman Baroque art and one of the most important influences on all of early modern European sculpture and architecture, Gian Lorenzo Bernini (1598-1680). His first work on Bernini was the first unabridged English translation and critical edition of one of the early biographical sources for the life of the artist, written by his youngest son: Domenico Bernini's Life of Gian Lorenzo Bernini (University Park, PA: Pennsylvania State University Press, 2011). Containing close to two hundred pages of source notes and a bibliography of over 600 titles, Mormando's Domenico Bernini edition, as the publisher's dustjacket explains, "is, in effect, a one-volume encyclopedia on the artist's life and work. As such, it stands alone within the immense bibliography of Bernini scholarship."

Months after the publication of the Domenico Bernini volume, Mormando produced his own biography of Gian Lorenzo, Bernini: His Life and His Rome. As English art historian Claire Ford-Wille emphasizes in her review of the work, "Bernini: His Life and His Rome is a biography for the general reader […]. Nonetheless, the biography is underpinned by Mormando's immense and serious research and is packed with information […]." Drawing on many years of research in compiling his annotated Domenico Bernini volume, this subsequent work "can claim to be the first biography of Bernini to appear in the English and one of the very few to appear in any language since the artist's death in 1680;" it is also the first to make "the pursuit of 'Bernini himself,' the uncensored flesh-and-blood human being, one of its primary objectives."

Departing in stark fashion from all of the previous, idealizing, hagiographic, uncritical portraits of Bernini of the preceding centuries, Bernini: His Life and His Rome has been criticized by a few readers for including so much unflattering, indeed, at times scandalous, information about Bernini and the people around him (including the popes and the cardinals who were his patrons), but, as the author himself points out in reply to these criticisms (in the online journal, Berfois of London, Oct. 11, 2012), all of the information in the book is documented in authentic primary sources. As Mormando further reports in the Berfois article, "[W]hen I first took up my Bernini biographical project [in 2000] and for a long time into it (it took eleven years to complete), I too simply accepted the conventional wisdom, the aforementioned clichés about Bernini, his religion and his art. Yet, the more I studied and uncovered the falsifications of Domenico's biography, the more I discovered the skeletons in the life of Bernini, and the more I read of the darker side of his seventeenth-century contemporaries, be they pope, cardinals, or laymen, the more skeptical I became of the myth of Bernini and of his 'Roma Sancta.' Hence, the present call to a more critical approach to the study of Bernini and his art and of his ecclesiastical patrons."

Describing the development of Bernini scholarship in modern times, author Loyd Grossman places Mormando in the same company as Rudolph Wittkower, John Pope-Hennessy and Irving Lavin, declaring: "Among today's scholars no one has done more to promote Bernini studies than [Franco] Mormando as author of the only English language biography of Bernini and through his magnificent editing of Domenico Bernini's life of his father."

=== Jesuit history ===
In addition to his book and articles on Franciscan topics, Mormando has also made Jesuit studies another one of his secondary specializations. In 2006, on the occasion of the anniversary of the Jesuit saint's death, Mormando organized an exhibition at the Burns Rare Book Library, Francis Xavier and the Jesuit Missions in the Far East, featuring the most important primary sources for the biography and canonization of 'the second Jesuit saint' (after Ignatius of Loyola), and contributing an article on "The Making of the Second Jesuit Saint: The Campaign for the Canonization of Francis Xavier, 1555-1622." Mormando also contributed to the planning of a 2018 art exhibition conceived and organized by Linda Wolk-Simon at the Fairfield University Art Museum devoted to Jesuit Baroque art, The Holy Name. Art of the Gesù: Bernini and His Age. His essay, "Gian Paolo Oliva: The Forgotten Celebrity of Baroque Rome", in the accompanying catalog (published by Saint Joseph University Press), presented the first major survey in English of the career of Jesuit Father General Oliva (1600-1681), a friend to and spiritual advisor to Gian Lorenzo Bernini. Most recently, Mormando has addressed the topic of "Ignatius the Franciscan: The Franciscan Roots of Jesuit Spirituality", overturning the received wisdom about the putative revolutionary, unique character of the spirituality and way of proceeding of the Jesuit order as founded by Ignatius of Loyola.

== Bibliography ==
All of Mormando's scholarly articles and book reviews are available for download from Academia.edu
