= UniFirst =

American corporation

UniFirst Corporation
- Company type: Public
- Traded as: NYSE: UNF; S&P 600 component
- Industry: Apparel industry, Workwear, Uniform service
- Founded: July 12, 1936; 89 years ago
- Founder: The Croatti family
- Headquarters: Wilmington, Massachusetts, U.S.
- Number of locations: 281 facilities (2025)
- Area served: United States, Canada, Europe
- Key people: Steven S. Sintros (President & CEO)
- Products: Uniforms; Workwear; Protective Clothing
- Services: Uniform rental; Laundering; Mending; Embroidery; Pickup & delivery; Facility services; Scheduled maintenance
- Revenue: ▲US$2.43 billion (2025)
- Operating income: ▲US$184 million (2025)
- Net income: ▲US$148 million (2025)
- Total assets: ▲US$2.78 billion (2025)
- Total equity: ▲US$2.17 billion (2025)
- Number of employees: 16,000 (2025)
- Subsidiaries: UniTech, UniClean, UniFirst-First Aid Group
- Website: unifirst.com

UniFirst Corporation is an American uniform rental company based in Wilmington, Massachusetts, that manufactures, sells, and rents uniforms and protective clothing. UniFirst employs more than 14,000 people and has over 260 facilities in the United States, Canada, and Europe, including customer service centers, nuclear decontamination facilities, cleanroom locations, distribution centers, and manufacturing plants.

== History ==
UniFirst was founded in 1936 by the Croatti family, under the name of National Overall Dry Cleaning Company. The company began in a horse barn that had been converted into a makeshift laundry, and its equipment consisted of a single washing machine and a delivery truck. It served Boston area factory workers and other laborers, whose heavy soiled work clothing needed to be cleaned frequently. The National Overall Dry Cleaning Company was incorporated in Massachusetts on October 6, 1950.

In the 1980s, UniFirst was sued by residents of Woburn, Massachusetts in a class-action lawsuit. The residents alleged that Unifirst, along with two other firms, had released pollution that had leaked into the water supply, and that this was a cause of increased instances of leukemia in the town. UniFirst settled with the residents without going to trial, for a sum of one million dollars. This episode was featured in the non-fiction book A Civil Action by Jonathan Harr, later adapted into a film of the same name. As of 2009, UniFirst's environmental record has improved; it has received awards for its water treatment processes from the Missouri Water Environment Association and the Water and Wastewater Utility Special Service Division of Austin, Texas, among others.

In 1991 Ronald Croatti became the chief executive officer of the company. He continued his rise in 1995, when he became the company president, and again in 2002, when he became the chairman of the board. In 2011, UniFirst featured in an episode of the reality television series Undercover Boss.

In May 2017, Ronald Croatti died and Steven S. Sintros became President & CEO.

In March 2026, UniFirst agreed to be acquired by Cintas in a deal valued at $5.5 billion.

== Products and services ==
UniFirst supplies uniforms and protective clothing, as well as restroom and cleaning products such as floor mats, mops, air fresheners and soap. Products that it manufactures in-house include work shirts, work pants, outerwear, and flame-resistant work apparel. It also manufactures a majority of the garments it places in rental programs.

== Subsidiaries ==
UniFirst subsidiary companies include Green Guard, UniTech Services Group, and UniClean. Green Guard is a corporate supplier of first aid equipment; UniTech provides laundering and decontamination services to the nuclear industry; and UniClean supplies clothing and services related to cleanrooms. UniFirst also has a Canadian uniform rental subsidiary called UniFirst Canada.

== Performance ==
UNF released in quarterly report pre-market on July 2, 2025. During the quarter, sales reached $610.8 million, marking a 1.2% increase from the $603.3 million reported in the same period last year. However, revenue fell short of analysts' expectations by $3.7 million because that increase was smaller than what experts hoped it would be. Net income rose to $39.7 M (or $2.13 per share), compared to $38.1 M ($2.03 per share) last year. Specialty garments revenue edged up to $47.8 M, but margins declined to 22.8% from 23.9% year-over-year.

== See also ==
- Anderson v. Cryovac, Inc. for suit by residents of Woburn, Massachusetts
