= Arthur Moyse =

Anglo-Irish anarchist writer (1914–2003)

- Born: 21 June 1914; County Wexford, Ireland
- Died: 22 February 2003 (aged 88)
- Occupations: Artist; Writer; Bus conductor
- World War II
- Branch: British Army
- Service years: 1940s
- Battles: Arnhem

Arthur Moyse (21 June 1914 – 22 February 2003) was an Anglo-Irish anarchist, artist and writer. He was born in County Wexford, Ireland in 1914. His father, who was a merchant seaman, was lost at sea when he was young. His family, including his mother and his grandmother, left Ireland and moved to Shepherd's Bush in West London. He was politically active during his youth and participated in the 1936 Battle of Cable Street in the East End of London by blocking British Union of Fascists leader Oswald Mosley’s march through the East End. He later served in the British Army during the Second World War. After the war, he worked on the buses for London Transport. From the later 1960s to the early 1980s, Moyse was involved with Freedom, the British anarchist newspaper, to which from 1960 to 2000, he submitted articles. He had several books published and he was a self-taught artist. On his death he left a huge archive of material.

== Early life ==
Moyse was brought up in Shepherds Bush by his working mother and his grandmother, who were 'solidly conservative'. Cunliffe (2007) recalled: 'Expelled at 14 as unmanageable, Arthur's serious education was mainly listening to the articulate socialist orator Tony Turner.' Good (2007) recalled that Moyse was entirely self-educated and that he spent much of his childhood in public libraries. While a youth Moyse blocked the British Union of Fascists leader Oswald Mosley's march through the East End of London during the 1936 Battle of Cable Street. He later served with the British Army in the Second World War, during which he was part of the 1944 airborne assault at Arnhem in the Netherlands. He was court-martialled twice for insubordination. (Note: Moyse (1986) opined: 'In resisting any collective authority, whether state or fancy free, in my conditioned, Stirner-styled, individual choice from a confused life-long social background, personal liberty shall be paramount.' (Moyse 1986).) In 1946, Moyse began work on the buses for London Transport as a bus conductor in West London. He kept his job for decades and refused to leave even when he was offered a promotion, seeing his job as part of his commitment to the working class.

== The artist ==
Moyse was a self-taught artist. Dave Cunliffe (2007), the Blackburn-based poet who founded the influential poetry magazine Poetmeat and its successor Global Tapestry, recalled that Moyse was prolific - he produced humorous and satirical cartoons, collages, watercolours, and pen-and-ink work, much of which was directed at the hypocrisies of middle-class life and the establishment. Cunliffe (2007) also recalled that, in the 1960s:

Alternative magazine publishing was then changing from ink and spirit mimeo to offset litho. As all good artists, Arthur adapted to reproductive technological change. He altered his drawing methodology to include more lines and dots and less solid density. The underground press then used smaller offset printing machines with only a few rollers and consequent difficulty with large areas of solid ink. This was the start of a definite recognizable Arthur Moyse drawing style. William Burroughs used to say that his true audience was those readers who championed the mimeo (stencil duplicated) underground alternative press of the 60´s. Arthur shared this view and often told me that the greatest scourge of literature was the glossy expensively produced funded magazines that nobody much ever read.

Around the middle to late 1960s, Moyse submitted illustrations to Cuddon's Cosmopolitan Review. From the late 1960s to the early 1980s, he was closely associated with Freedom, the British anarchist newspaper, to which he contributed illustrations and political cartoons.

Moyse exhibited his art in various London galleries, including solo shows at the Flowers Gallery, and was a familiar figure in Soho’s radical and bohemian arts scenes. He maintained a habit of sending illustrated letters and postcards to friends, often including satirical or political messages. He also illustrated texts, for example Shelley's The Mask of Anarchy (1978).

== The writer ==
Moyse wrote articles for various journals, including Ambit, Anarchy, Industrial Worker, Freedom and its associated quarterly publication, The Raven. For Freedom he submitted articles under the headings Around the galleries, which at least on one occasion became Round the galleries, which began by at least 1960. His published works include his editorship of the anthology The golden convolvulus (1965), for which he wrote the introduction. This was followed some years later by three publications, More in Sorrow Six short stories (1976), Fragments of Notes for an Autobiography (1982), and a co-authored pamphlet Surrealism and Revolution (1965) with fellow anarchist Jim Duke. (Note: Jim Duke was likely James Herriott Duke (1939-1992).)

From the above works, The golden convolvulus (1965) attracted notoriety. Wilkinson (2016) documented that Moyse conceived the idea for the anthology and visited Cunliffe in Blackburn, Lancashire to discuss the possibility of its publication. Cunliffe duly published the anthology in an issue of Poetmeat, a bi-monthly avant-garde magazine, under the banner of Screeches Publications, his publishing company. The problems with authority began in mid-July 1965 when the local branch of the Post Office opened packets of the magazine to ensure that they were compliant with 'printed paper rate regulations'. Having opened the packets, the branch drew the attention of the police to them, because of which Cunliffe was asked to reveal the subscribers and mailees of Poetmeat. Cunliffe refused to reveal the information. Consequently, he was charged on two counts, 'for offences against the 1953 Post Office Act and for publishing an obscene article for gain.' Sutherland (1983) observed: 'The jury took several house to return a verdict, and eventually came up with a muddle.' Cunliffe was found 'guilty of sending a postal packet containing indecent material'. However, he was found 'not guilty of publishing an obscene article.'

Much later Cunliffe (2007) quoted Ray Gosling, the broadcaster and journalist, as having described Moyse's appearance in court (Note: Most likely Blackburn Quarter Sessions, see Sutherland 1983, p. 62.) as follows:

'A large, round, bald pated, jolly — he's a bus conductor on London transport route 73 — fast talking, much the Londoner. This was the first time he'd spoke in public. Yes, he was an artist, and a writer, and a labouring man. It was him that had done the drawings on the covers. Him that had written the introduction. He was talking so fast the Assistant Recorder kept stopping him for the shorthand girl was falling behind. Arthur Moyse went on about how his mother had scrubbed and cleaned and done out for the rich. He harped on his working class background. He was no long hair beatnik, no juvenile. He was like the jurymen.'

== Later years ==
In his later years, Moyse lived in a small, cluttered flat in Shepherd's Bush, surrounded by decades' worth of newspapers, zines, and art materials. He became increasingly reclusive, especially after the death of his beloved dog, Vicki. He died in 2003 at the age of 88.

== Legacy ==
In 2019 academic curator Jessica Smith expressed her fear that Moyse's huge archive of material 'has all but disappeared'. The Arts Council holds his work Private View in its collection. Chelsea Arts Club holds one of his works in its collection. And the Victoria and Albert Museum has a print by him in its collection. The John Rylands Research Institute and Library holds a substantial amount of cutting and original artwork by Moyse in its Dave Cunliffe Collection. (Note: Detailed information about the collection is available elsewhere at Dave Cunliffe Collection.) His artistic and written works have become collectable.

== Publications ==
=== Articles ===
1960s

- 1960. "Dream". Ambit. 5 (Summer): 26–29. 1960. JSTOR 44334438.
- 1960. "Around the galleries" (PDF). Freedom. 21 (19): 2. 1960.
- 1960. "Around the galleries" (PDF). Freedom. 21 (50): 2. 1960.
- 1964. "From the step of a bus". Anarchy. 4 (18): 289–293.
- 1966. "A funny thing happened". Cuddon's Cosmpolitan Review (10): 16–22.
- 1966. "Aberfan and the price of coal" (PDF). Freedom. 27 (34): 1. 1966.
- 1966. "Round the galleries" (PDF). Freedom. 27 (5): 2. 1966.
- 1967. "Dear John ..." Anarchy. 7 (2): 50–53. 1967.
- 1968. "A monstrous strip cartoon" (PDF). Freedom. 29 (40): 2. 1968.
- 1968. "The mirror of illusion". Anarchy. 8 (9): 258–268.

1970s

- 1972. "Free 'free'?" (PDF). Anarchy. 10: 18–21.
- 1976. "Upon this brick" (PDF). Freedom. 37 (5): 13–14. 1976.
- 1979. "sound of a distant drum Trade Union Circus" (PDF). Industrial Worker. 79 (10): 6. 1979.

1980s

- 1981. "Sound of a distant drum" (PDF). Industrial Worker. 78 (2): 6. 1981.
- 1986. "Let 1,000 words, or less, bloom" (PDF). Freedom. 47 (9): 64. 1986. ISSN 0016-0504.
- 1987. "Surrealism in England: What about Jesus?" (PDF). The Raven. 2: 147–149.

1990s

- 1991. "Crippen wasn't all bad" (PDF). The Raven. 4 (3): 256–259. ISSN 0951-4066.
- 1994. "Boo" (PDF). The Raven. 7 (1): 77–81. ISSN 0951-4066.
- 1995. "A splendid little war" (PDF). The Raven. 8 (1): 42–47. ISSN 0951-4066.
- 1996. "Beauty lies ..." (PDF). The Raven. 9 (1): 43–46. ISSN 0951-4066.

2000

- 2000. "Give 'em the mouth" (PDF). The Raven. 11 (1): 33–37. ISSN 0951-4066.

=== Miscellaneous ===
- 1964. "The end of the road". Busmen What next? (PDF). Solidarity. 1964. pp. 19–23.

=== Books ===
1960s

- 1963. Patrick Hughes. London: Portal Gallery.
- 1965. (With Jim Duke) Surrealism and revolution: An anthology. London: Simian - Son of Coptic Press.
- 1965. The golden convolvulus. Blackburn: Screeches Publications.
- 1968. Wildly flowering sinisterly creeping joyously twinning beautiful terrible garden world. Blackburn: BB Books. ISBN 0901141089.

1970s

- 1976. More in sorrow Six short stories. London: Kropotkin's Lighthouse Publications. 1976. ISBN 0950181676.

1980s

- 1982. Fragments of notes for an autobiography. Telford: Woody Books. 1982. ISBN 0907751105.
