= A Civil Action =

1995 non-fiction book by Jonathan Harr

- Cover to the paperback edition
- Author: Jonathan Harr
- Language: English
- Published: August 29, 1995
- Publisher: Random House
- Publication place: United States
- Media type: Print (Hardcover and Paperback)
- Pages: 500
- ISBN: 978-0-394-56349-7
- OCLC: 31969453
- LC Class: KF228.A667 H37 1996
- Followed by: The Lost Painting: The Quest for a Caravaggio Masterpiece

A Civil Action is a 1995 non-fiction book by Jonathan Harr about a water contamination case in Woburn, Massachusetts, in the 1980s. The book became a best-seller. It won the National Book Critics Circle Award for nonfiction.

It is based on the case of Anderson v. Cryovac. The first reported decision in the case is at 96 F.R.D. 431 (denial of defendants' motion to dismiss).

A 1998 film of the same name, starring John Travolta as plaintiff's lawyer Jan Schlichtmann and Robert Duvall as Beatrice Foods attorney Jerome Facher, was based on the book.

== Plot summary ==
After finding that her child is diagnosed with leukemia, Anne Anderson notices a high prevalence of leukemia, a relatively rare disease, in her city. Eventually she gathers other families and seeks a lawyer, Jan Schlichtmann, to consider their options.

Schlichtmann originally decides not to take the case due to both the lack of evidence and a clear defendant. Later picking up the case, Schlichtmann finds evidence suggesting trichloroethylene (TCE, an industrial solvent that is not known to cause leukemia in humans) contamination of the town's water supply by Riley Tannery, a subsidiary of Beatrice Foods; a chemical company, W. R. Grace; and another company named Unifirst.

In the course of the lawsuit Schlichtmann gets other attorneys to assist him. He spends lavishly as he had in his prior lawsuits, but the length of the discovery process and trial stretch all of their assets to their limit.

Though Unifirst settles for a little over $1 million, the money immediately is invested in the case against Grace and Beatrice. The plaintiffs' case against Grace is far stronger for two reasons: (1) Schlichtmann has a personal testimony of a former employee of Grace who had witnessed dumping, and (2) a river between Beatrice's tannery and the contaminated wells makes Beatrice's contribution to the contamination less likely. The jury finds Beatrice not liable. Though Schlichtmann's firm anticipates a much higher settlement, the dire state of its finances forces it to accept a settlement from W.R. Grace for $8 million.

Schlichtmann disperses the settlement to the families, excluding expenses and attorney's fees (which resulted in approx. $375,000 per family). When some families think Schlichtmann had overbilled expenses, he acquiesces and surrenders more of his fee. Schlichtmann later files for bankruptcy after losing his condo and car; he lived in his office for a time. Schlichtmann eventually practices environmental, civil, and personal injury law.

A report from the Environmental Protection Agency (which later filed its own lawsuits against the companies based on new evidence) concludes from sludge removed from the site that both companies had contaminated the wells.

In 1988, Schlichtmann attempts to reraise the case against Beatrice, but the judge dismisses the case, citing testimony from Beatrice's soil chemist. However, due to the lawsuits brought forward by the Environmental Protection Agency, W.R. Grace and Beatrice Foods are eventually forced to pay for the largest chemical cleanup in the history of the Northeastern United States at that time, which cost about $68 million.

== Critical reception ==
The New York Times wrote that "Harr does not overdramatize individual scenes, but he does depict a world containing three types of people: innocent victims, lonely crusaders and the malignant pawns of the corporate state." Kirkus Reviews called the book "a crash course in big-bucks tort litigation, as rich as any novel on the scene."
