= Sword of Peter =

Christian relic

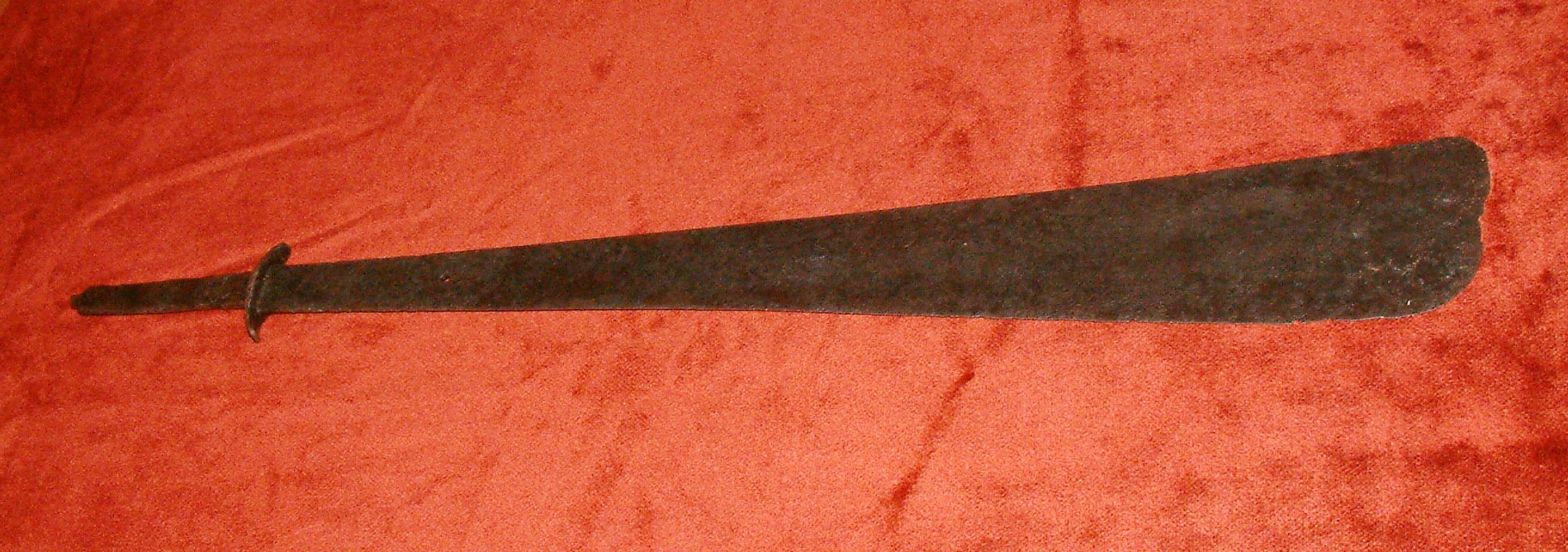
Sword in Archdiocesan Museum

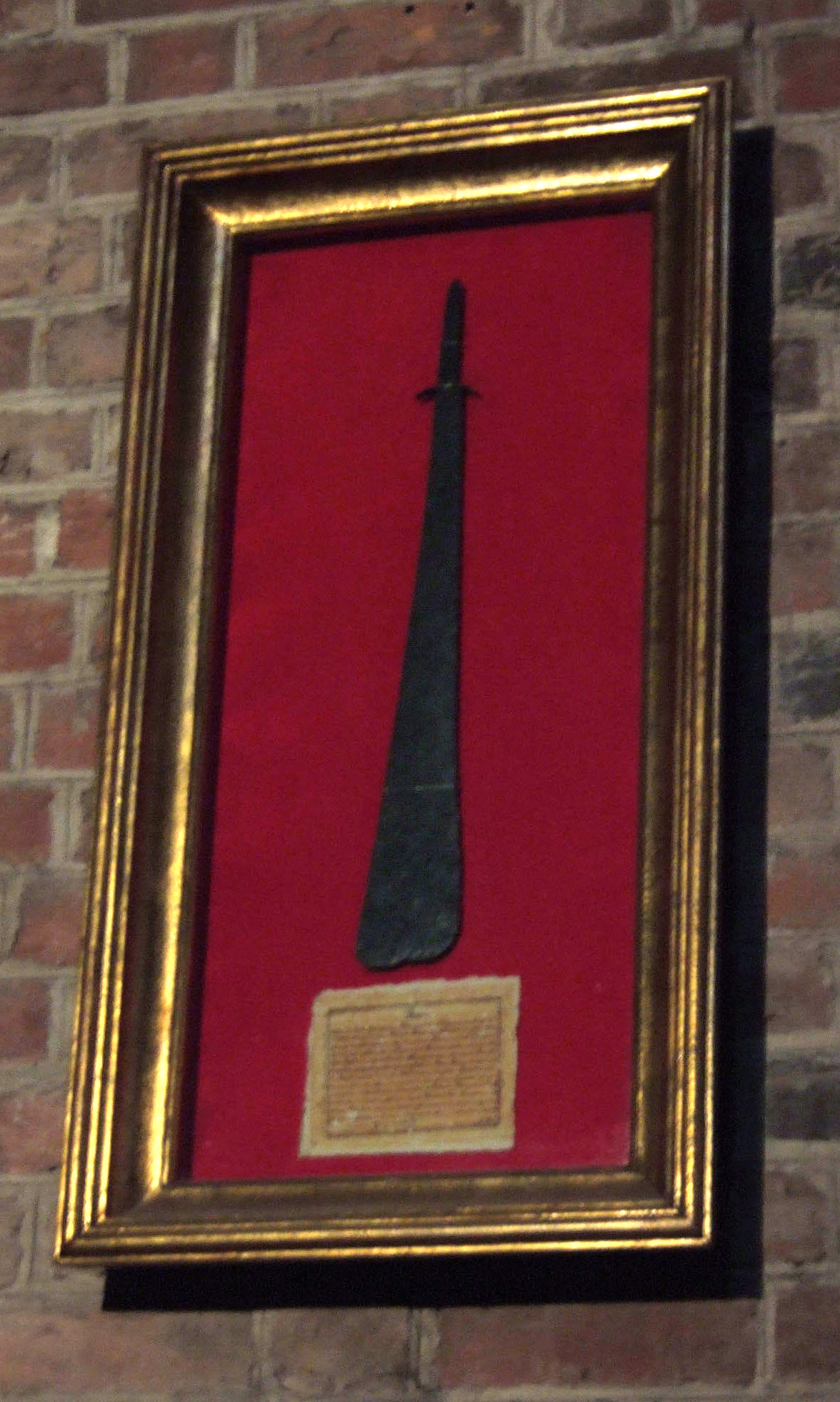
The copy of Saint Peter's Sword displayed in Poznań Archcathedral.

The Sword of Saint Peter (Polish: Miecz świętego Piotra) is a religious relic held in the Poznań Archdiocesan Museum.

It is claimed to be the sword with which the Apostle Peter cut off the right ear of the high priest's servant at the time of Jesus' arrest in Gethsemane. The sword is wide-tipped, similar in shape to a dussack or machete. An exact copy of the sword, made by Bogdan Puchalski, is displayed on the wall of the Poznań Archcathedral Basilica.

== History ==
The sword is mentioned for the first time in 1609 in Vitae Episcoporum Posnaniensium of Jan Długosz as being the original Roman sword, or gladius, used by Saint Peter in the Gospels, or a direct copy made for Pope Stephen VII. However, at that time Stephen was already dead, and the current pope was John XIII.

The sword arrived in Poznań in 968 as a gift from John XIII for either Bishop Jordan or Duke Mieszko I. The Archdeacon of Poznań Cathedral in 1699 wrote about the sword, describing it as a part of Saint Peter's sword brought to Poznań by Bishop Jordan, where it was usually kept in the cathedral treasury, except for the few times a year when it was shown to the people. The 1721 Decree of Poznań Cathedral Chapter refers to having the sword moved to the chapter house as a more proper placement for the artifact.

== Folklore ==
According to British folklore, St. Joseph of Arimathea brought the sword to Britain, and it was kept at Glastonbury Abbey for many years until the abbot gave it to Saint George.

== Description ==
- The blade was made from a single piece of iron with an added small cross-guard
- Total length: 70.2 centimetres (27.6 in), it was probably 1 or 2 cm longer, but the tip of the sword was destroyed by corrosion
- Maximal width, at the tip: 9.4 cm (3.7 in)
- There is a hole 10.3 cm (4.1 in) from the end of the hilt, which is 0.4 cm (0.2 in) in diameter
