= Malchus =

Subject of a miracle by Jesus according to the Bible

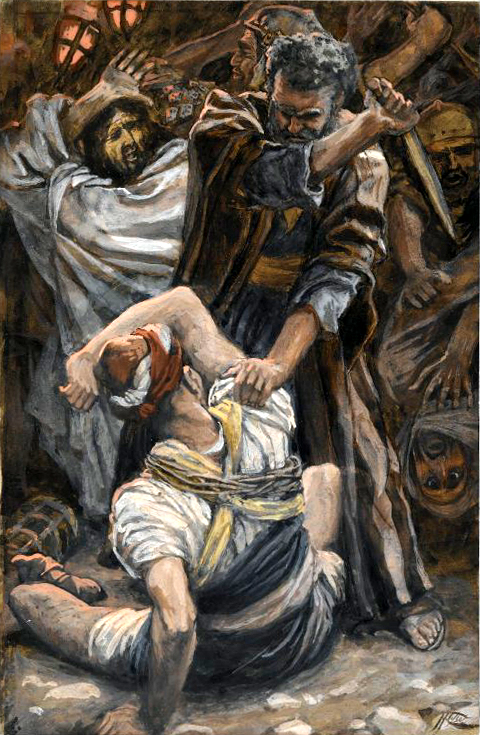
Brooklyn Museum – The Ear of Malchus (L'oreille de Malchus) – James Tissot

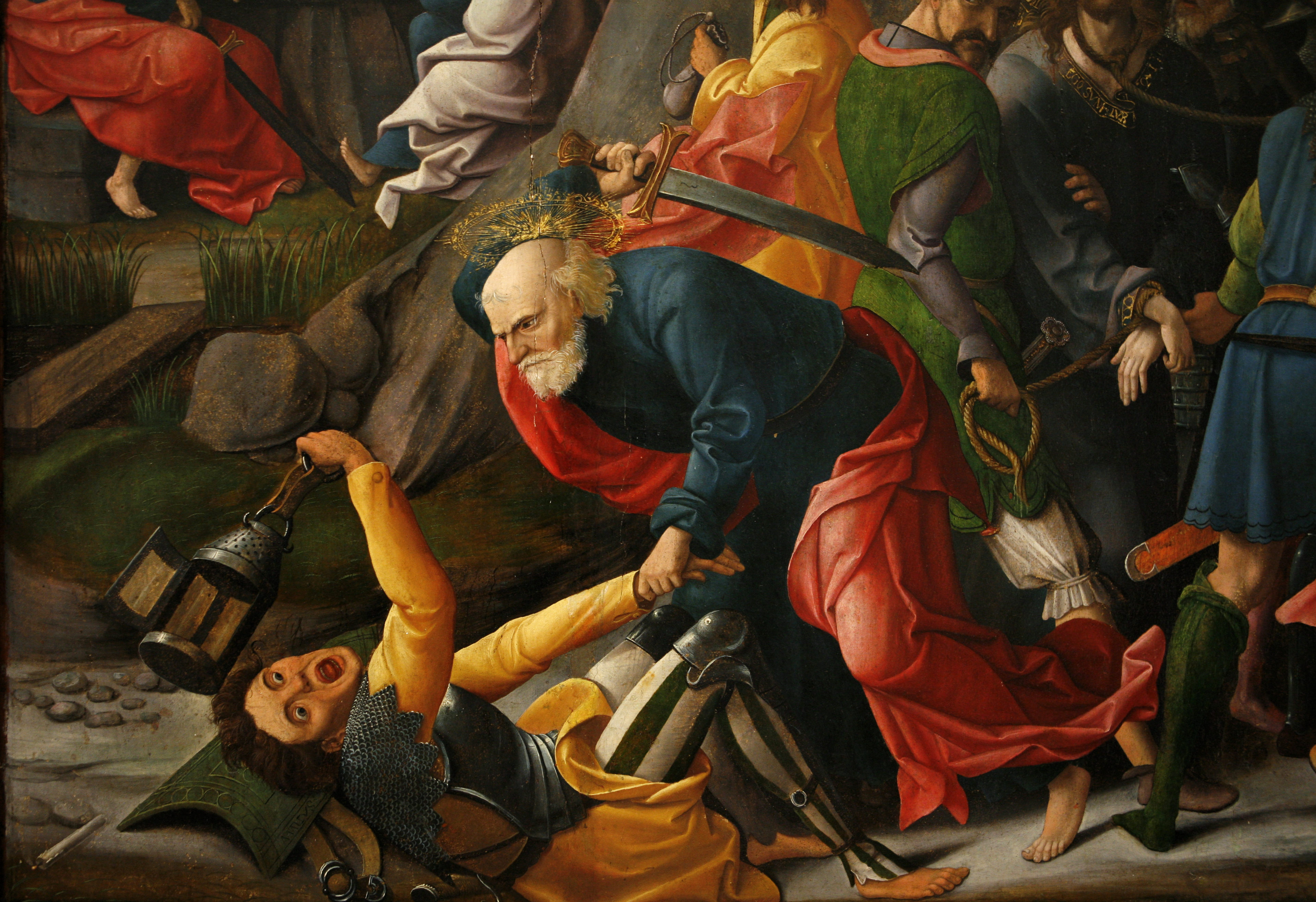
A depiction of Peter striking Malchus (c. 1520, Musée des Beaux-Arts de Dijon)

Malchus (/ˈmælkəs/; Koine Greek: Μάλχος, romanized: Málkhos, pronounced [ˈmal.kʰos]) was the servant of the Jewish High Priest Caiaphas who participated in the arrest of Jesus as written in the four gospels. According to the Bible, one of the disciples, Simon Peter, being armed with a sword, cut off the servant's ear in an attempt to prevent the arrest of Jesus.

== Biblical accounts ==
That a disciple cut off the ear of a servant of the high priest is related in all four canonical gospels, in Matthew 26:51, Mark 14:47, Luke 22:50–51, and John 18:10–11, but Simon Peter and Malchus are named only in the Gospel of John. Also, Luke is the only gospel that says Jesus healed the servant. This was Jesus' last recorded miracle prior to his resurrection.

The relevant passages in the Gospels of John and Luke, KJV, read:

10 Then Simon Peter having a sword drew it, and smote the high priest's servant, and cut off his right ear. The servant's name was Malchus.
11 Then said Jesus unto Peter, Put up thy sword into the sheath: the cup which my Father hath given me, shall I not drink it?

— John 18:10–11

50 And one of them smote the servant of the high priest, and cut off his right ear.
51 And Jesus answered and said, Suffer ye thus far. And he touched his ear, and healed him.

— Luke 22:50–51

James F. McGrath suggests that this account reflects an event that did happen, in that early Christians would hardly have invented a story portraying themselves as violent.

Later in Chapter 18, John records that a relative of Malchus witnessed Peter's assault in the Garden of Gethsemane, and identified Peter as a follower of Christ. Peter denied this.

== Other accounts ==
4th century church father Jerome cites a post-resurrection appearance of Jesus to Malchus, quoting a passage from the lost "gospel according to the Hebrews." "And when the Lord had given the linen cloth to the servant of the priest, he went to James and appeared to him."

== Literature and arts ==
Thornton Wilder wrote a short play entitled, "The Servant's Name Was Malchus"; it appears in the collection The Angel That Troubled the Waters and Other Plays.

The Fire Gospel, a 2008 novel by Michel Faber, centers on the discovery of the fictional lost gospel of Malchus.

Malchus is portrayed by Paul Brightwell in the 2013 TV miniseries The Bible.

In the 2004 Mel Gibson film The Passion of the Christ, Malchus is represented as an armed member of the temple guard. In this depiction, Jesus heals Malchus' wounded ear, leaving the latter to stay behind sitting dumbfounded in a state of disbelief, suggesting a possible conversion to Christianity.

Isak Dinesen in The Deluge at Norderney (the first of Seven Gothic Tales) relates a story about Simon Peter wherein he uses the memory of cutting off Malchus' ear "to control his temper".

The book Touch by John Ferguson portrays Malchus as a Roman soldier sent by Pilate to spy on the Sanhedrin. Malchus is then sent by Caiaphas to spy on Jesus and his followers.

== See also ==
- Sword of Saint Peter
