= Anderson v. Cryovac, Inc. =

1986 US federal lawsuit concerning toxic contamination of groundwater

- Court: United States Court of Appeals for the First Circuit
- Full case name: Anne Anderson, et al. v. Cryovac, Inc.
- Argued: September 3 1986
- Decided: November 5 1986
- Citations: Anderson v. Cryovac, Inc., 805 F.2d 1 (1st Cir. 1986).

Anderson v. Cryovac was a federal lawsuit concerning toxic contamination of groundwater in 1986 in Woburn, Massachusetts.

== Case ==
The residents of Woburn, Massachusetts sued Beatrice Foods, the operator of a tannery; Cryovac, a subsidiary of W. R. Grace and Company; and UniFirst, a laundry service, for dumping chemicals that contaminated nearby groundwater. The occurrence of a cancer cluster and other negative effects on health led to revelations of water polluted primarily with trichloroethylene and perchloroethylene.

The first trial included contentious disputes over splitting the trial into separate liability and damages phases. The Court decided to "bifurcate" let the jury decide first whether there was enough evidence to hold the defendants liable for the water contamination, and which defendants would be held responsible for any proven damages to the plaintiffs as a result of the contamination. If any of the defendants were determined by the jury to not be liable, then they would be dismissed from the second part of the trial to determine damages. W.R. Grace was found liable, and Beatrice was found not liable. Judge Walter Jay Skinner granted a motion for a mistrial put by W. R. Grace. Woburn residents then appealed that motion, along with Beatrice's not liable verdict. The Court of Appeal ordered a new trial.

The district court then found that a discovery error made by Beatrice impaired the plaintiffs' preparation process, but recommended that its earlier denial of motion for relief from judgment be sustained. On appeal, the circuit court judge held that: first, the district court did not abuse its discretion by its determination regarding pretrial discovery, namely, the district court had determined that the operator's failure to disclose a report during pretrial discovery did not warrant relief from judgment. Second, the judge held that the district court did not abuse its discretion when it determined that the operator's nondisclosure of a report was roughly equivalent to residents' improper continuation of prosecution of their claim, and thus that monetary sanctions should not be imposed upon either party. Finally, the judge found that the operator's nondisclosure of report did not constitute “fraud on the court” which would trigger entry of default.

On 22 September 1986, W.R. Grace settled with the plaintiffs for an undisclosed amount of money. However, many sources report that it was around $8 million (equivalent to roughly $23 million in 2024).

== Follow-up ==
On January 28, 1987, W.R. Grace was indicted by a grand jury of lying to the EPA about its usage and disposal of toxic waste. 4 Restaurants and 2 hotels now occupy the site on Washington Street in Woburn formerly occupied by the W.R. Grace facility.

== Media ==
The book A Civil Action, published in 1996, documents the case and related events. The 1998 film of the same name, starring John Travolta as plaintiffs' lawyer Jan Schlichtmann, was drawn from the book and loosely based on the case and related events.

== Bibliography ==
- A Civil Action: A Documentary Companion, By Lewis A Grossman, Robert G Vaughn (West 2008) (ISBN 9781599415581)
- Anderson v. Cryovac, C.A. No. 82-1672-S (D. Mass); (Anne Anderson et al. v. Cryovac Inc. W.R. Grace Inc., John J. Riley Company Inc., Beatrice Inc. et al. Superior Court Civil Action #82-2444, Commonwealth of Massachusetts. Filed May 14, 1982.)
- Anderson v. Cryovac, Inc., 96 F.R.D. 431 (D. Mass. 1983)
- Anderson v. W.R. Grace & Co., 628 F. Supp. 1219 (D. Mass. 1986)
- Anderson v. Cryovac, Inc., 805 F.2d 1 (1st Cir. Mass. 1986)
- Anderson v. Cryovac, Inc., 862 F.2d 910 (1st Cir. Mass. 1988), on remand, Anderson v. Beatrice Foods Co., 127 F.R.D. 1 (D. Mass. 1989)
- Anderson v. Beatrice Foods Co., 129 F.R.D. 394 (D. Mass. 1989), aff'd, 900 F.2d 388 (1st Cir.), cert. denied, 498 U.S. 891 (1990)
