= The Taking of Christ (Caravaggio) =

Painting by Caravaggio

- Cattura di Cristo nell' orto (Italian)
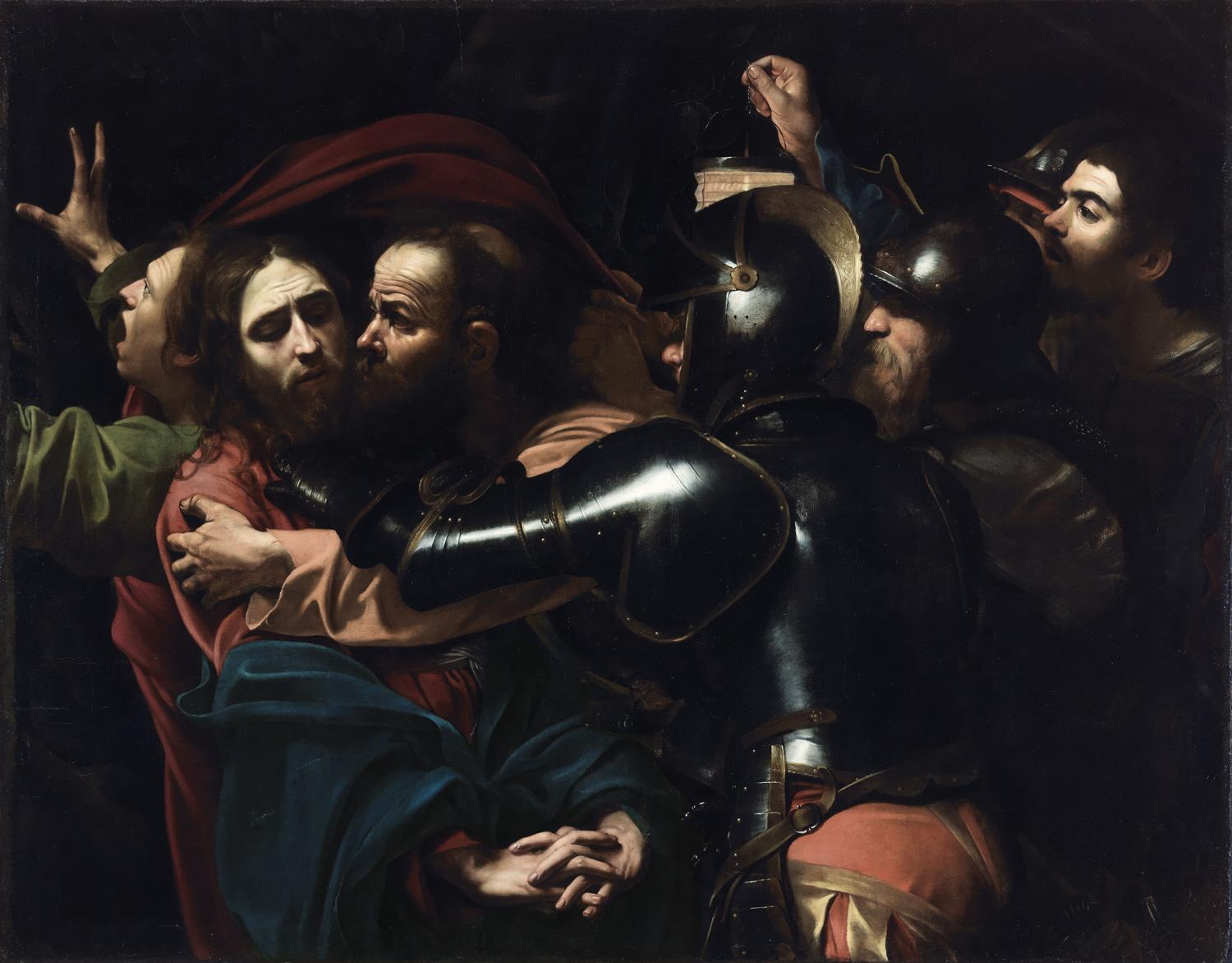
- Artist: Caravaggio
- Year: c. 1602
- Medium: oil on canvas
- Dimensions: 133.5 cm × 169.5 cm (52.6 in × 66.7 in)
- Location: National Gallery of Ireland, Dublin (loan from the Society of Jesus, Leeson Street)

The Taking of Christ (Italian: Presa di Cristo nell'orto or Cattura di Cristo) is a painting, of the arrest of Jesus, by the Italian Baroque master Michelangelo Merisi da Caravaggio. Originally commissioned by the Roman nobleman Ciriaco Mattei in 1602, it is housed in the National Gallery of Ireland, Dublin.

== Description ==
There are seven figures in the painting: from left to right they are John, Jesus, Judas, three soldiers (the one furthest to the right barely visible in the rear), and a man holding a lantern to the scene. They are standing, and only the upper three-quarters of their bodies are depicted. Judas has just kissed Jesus to identify him for the soldiers. The figures are arrayed before a very dark background, in which the setting is obscured. The main light source is not evident in the painting, but comes from the upper left. The lesser light source is the lantern held by the man at the right (believed to be a self-portrait of Caravaggio, presumably representing Saint Peter, who would first betray Jesus by denying him, and then go on to bring the light of Christ to the world). At the far left, a man (St John) is fleeing; his arms are raised, his mouth is open in a gasp, and his cloak is flying and being snatched back by a soldier.

== Analysis ==
The flight of the terrified John contrasts with the entrance of the artist. One scholar claims that Caravaggio is making the point that even a sinner more than 1,500 years after the resurrection has a better understanding of Christ than does his friend. (Note: Apesos gives a close reading of the iconography of this canvas as seen through the lens of contemporary preachers and other theological primary sources of Caravaggio's day.) Susan Gubar writes that Caravaggio's self-insertion emphasizes "humankind's complicity in and commonality with Judas and his deed."

Two of the more puzzling details of the painting are, one, the fact that the heads of Jesus and John seem to visually meld together in the upper left corner, and, two, the fact of the prominent presence, in the very centre of the canvas and in the foremost plane of the picture, of the arresting officer's highly polished, metal-clad arm. Regarding the detail of the polished metal pauldron of the soldier in the centre of the picture, Franco Mormando suggests that it was meant by the artist to serve as a mirror, a mirror of self-reflection and examination of conscience (such as in Caravaggio's Martha and Mary Magdalene in Detroit). As do many spiritual writers and preachers of the time, the artist may be "inviting his viewers to see themselves reflected in the behaviour of Judas" through their own daily acts of betrayal of Jesus, that is, through their sin.

== Sources ==
The central group, composed of Jesus, Judas and the soldier with an outstretched hand, resembles a 1509 woodcut by Albrecht Dürer from his Small Passion series.

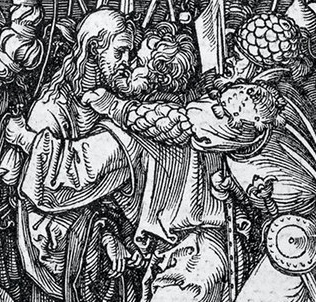
Woodcut by Albrecht Dürer (detail)

== Loss and rediscovery ==
By the late 18th century, the painting was thought to have disappeared, and its whereabouts remained unknown for about 200 years. In 1990, Caravaggio's lost masterpiece was recognized in the residence of the Society of Jesus in Dublin, Ireland. The rediscovery was published in November 1993.

The painting was hanging in the Dublin Jesuits' dining room since the early 1930s, but had long been considered a copy of the lost original by Gerard van Honthorst, also known as Gherardo delle Notti, one of Caravaggio's Dutch followers. This erroneous attribution had already been made while the painting was in the possession of the Roman Mattei family, whose ancestor had originally commissioned it. In 1786, one Giuseppe Vasi misattributed the painting, recording it as a work by Honthorst, and this error had been repeated in an inventory of the Mattei family's possessions taken in 1793. In 1802, the Mattei sold it, as a work by Honthorst, to William Hamilton Nisbet. It hung in his home in Scotland until 1921. Later in that decade, still unrecognised, the painting was sold to an Irish paediatrician, Marie Lea-Wilson, who eventually donated it in the 1930s (Note: There is no evidence to suggest 1934.) to the Jesuit Fathers in Dublin, in gratitude for their support following the shooting of her husband, Capt. Percival Lea-Wilson, a District Inspector in the Royal Irish Constabulary in Gorey, County Wexford, by the Irish Republican Army on 15 June 1920.

The Taking of Christ remained in the Dublin Jesuits' possession for about 60 years, until it was spotted and recognised, in the early 1990s, by Sergio Benedetti, Senior Conservator of the National Gallery of Ireland, who had been asked by Father Noel Barber, S.J., to examine a number of paintings in the Leeson Street Jesuit Community (of which Barber was superior) for the purposes of restoration. As layers of dirt and discoloured varnish were removed, the high technical quality of the painting was revealed, and it was tentatively identified as Caravaggio's lost painting. Much of the credit for verifying the authenticity of this painting belongs to Francesca Cappelletti and Laura Testa, two graduate students at the University of Rome. During a long session of research, they found the first recorded mention of The Taking of Christ, in an ancient and decaying account book documenting the original commission and payments to Caravaggio, in the archives of the Mattei family, kept in the cellar of a palazzo in the small town of Recanati.

The painting is on indefinite loan to the National Gallery of Ireland from the Jesuit Community, Leeson Street, Dublin, who acknowledge the kind generosity of Dr Marie Lea-Wilson. It was displayed in the United States as the centrepiece of a 1999 exhibition entitled "Saints and Sinners", organized by Franco Mormando at the McMullen Museum of Art, at Boston College, and at the 2006 "Rembrandt / Caravaggio" exhibition in the van Gogh Museum, Amsterdam. In 2010 it was displayed from February to June at the Scuderie del Quirinale, Rome, for the 400th anniversary of Caravaggio's death. In 2016, it was displayed in the National Gallery, London.

From May to September 2024, the painting was on loan at the Ulster Museum in Belfast, displayed alongside another work of Caravaggio, The Supper at Emmaus, painted around 1601. Both paintings had been rarely, if ever, seen together since the early 17th century.

In 2025, the painting was on loan to Galleria Nazionale d'Arte Antica (Palazzo Barberini) in Rome for the Caravaggio exhibition.

== Copies ==
There are at least 12 known copies of this painting. These include ones in the Metropolitan Cathedral of Sucre Museum in Bolivia and St Bede's College, Manchester, and one formerly in the Walter P. Chrysler Jr. Collection.

== Versions ==
=== Odesa version ===
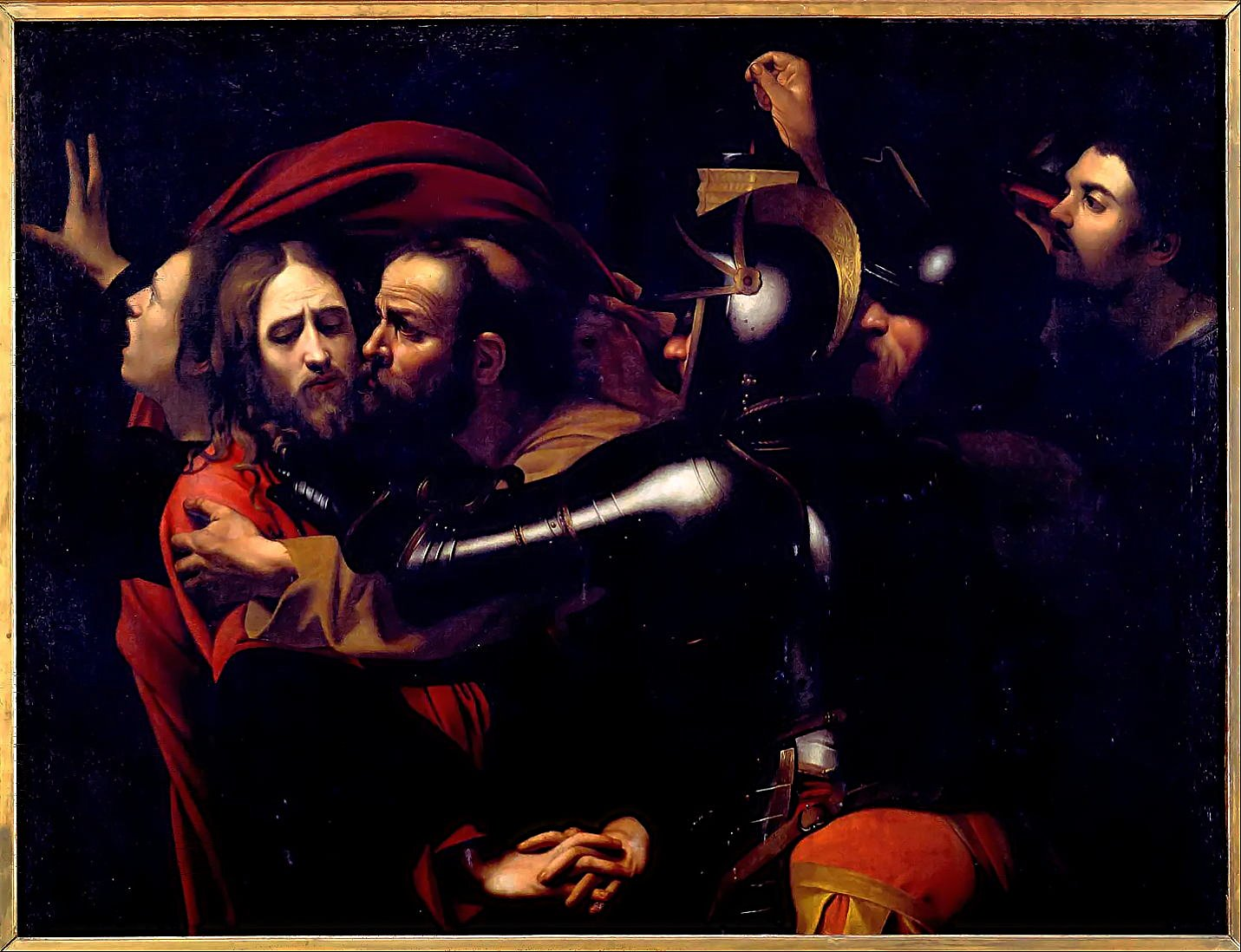
The Odesa version of The Taking of Christ before it was stolen in July 2008.

The Odesa Museum of Western and Eastern Art (Ukraine) houses a version of The Taking of Christ. In the 1950s, Soviet art historians attributed it to Caravaggio, although its authorship has remained the subject of scholarly debate. In 1993, Italian art historian Sergio Benedetti argued that the painting was not by Caravaggio but was instead a copy executed by Giovanni di Attili for Ciriaco Mattei, at the request of Ciriaco's brother Asdrubale. Other scholars have continued to support an attribution to Caravaggio, and its authorship remains disputed.

The painting was stolen from the museum in 2008 and recovered in Germany in 2010 during a joint police operation. Following forensic examination and the completion of legal formalities, it was returned to Ukraine.

=== Sannini (Ruffo) version ===
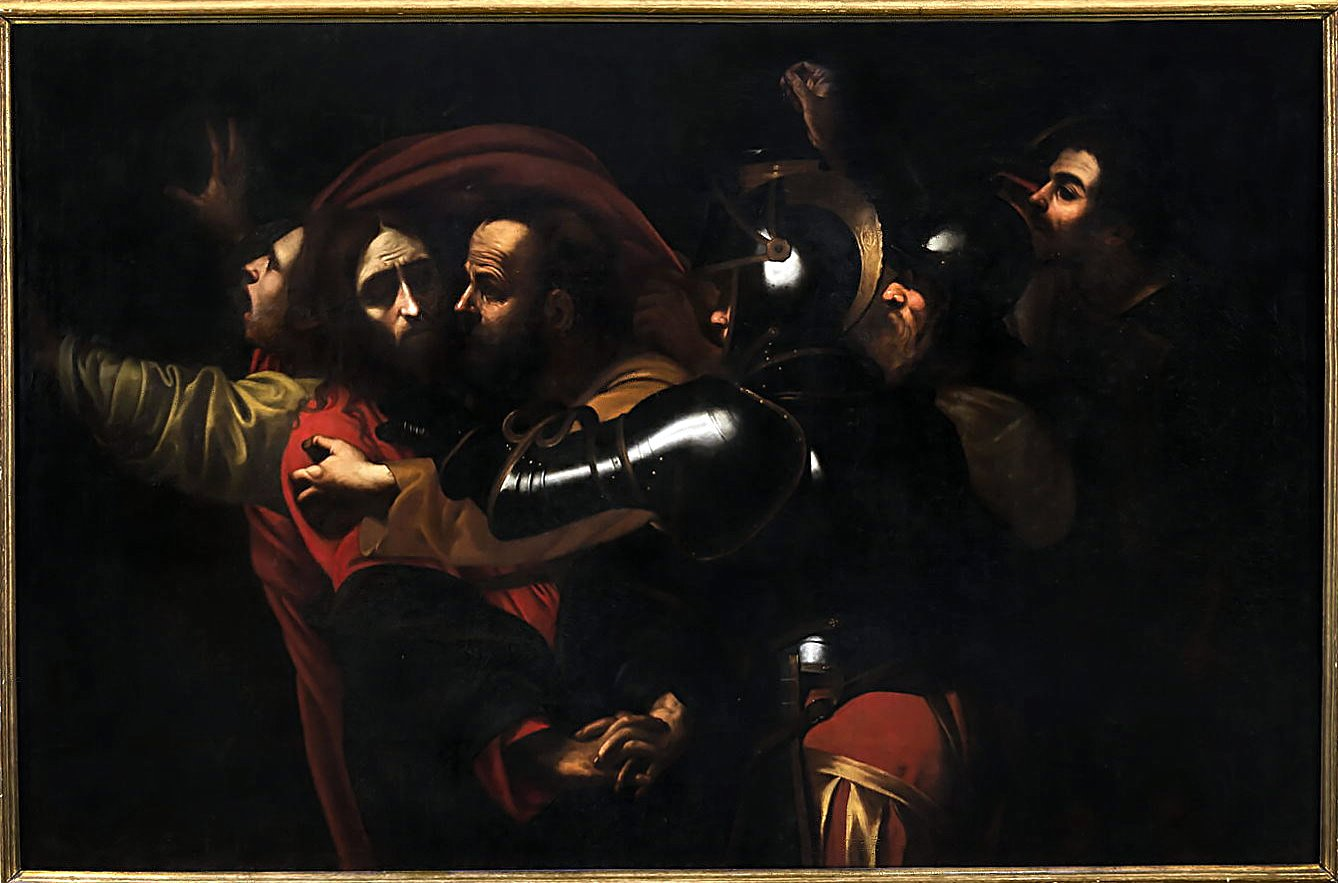
The Ruffo version of The Taking of Christ on long-term display at Palazzo Chigi in Ariccia..

A version owned by the Sannini family of Florence came to the attention of Roberto Longhi in 1943, who considered it a copy. It was exhibited in 1951 at the Mostra del Caravaggio e dei Caravaggeschi at the Palazzo Reale in Milan, organised by Longhi. After the exhibition, the painting was not publicly exhibited again until 2023 and remained little known in scholarly circles.

In 2003, dealer Mario Bigetti, suspecting it was an original, contracted to buy it. He consulted Maria Letizia Paoletti, who argued that the large number of pentimenti visible under X-ray examination supported the attribution to Caravaggio. Sir Denis Mahon, who had authenticated the Dublin version in 1993, stated in 2004 that the Sannini version was Caravaggio's original, while the Dublin painting was a copy by Caravaggio himself. This prompted comments in the Irish and British media in February 2004.

The Sannini version became the subject of a legal dispute and was taken into official custody, where pigment analysis by Maurizio Seracini identified Naples yellow, a pigment not known to have been used before 1615. Seracini argued that this indicated the painting could not be the original, whereas Paoletti disputed that conclusion. Jonathan Harr accepted Seracini's argument, while Michael Daley of ArtWatch remained unconvinced.

Following years of limited public visibility, the painting was exhibited in 2023 as Caravaggio. La presa di Cristo dalla Collezione Ruffo at Palazzo Chigi in Ariccia. The exhibition renewed scholarly interest in the painting as a possible autograph version of The Taking of Christ.

Technical examinations, including radiography, infrared reflectography and other methods, revealed compositional changes and numerous pentimenti. Supporters of the attribution to Caravaggio cite these findings, together with the painting's technical characteristics and compositional differences, as evidence in favour of his authorship. In particular, Italian art historian Francesco Petrucci, director of the Museum of Roman Baroque at Palazzo Chigi, has argued that the painting represents the earliest version of The Taking of Christ, whereas other scholars continue to regard it as a high-quality copy executed by a follower of Caravaggio or in his workshop.

In accordance with a decree issued by the Italian Ministry of Cultural Heritage on 2 December 2004, the painting was declared a work of particular interest to the nation.

Since September 2025, the painting has been on long-term display at Palazzo Chigi in Ariccia under a five-year gratuitous loan agreement between its private owner and the Municipality of Ariccia.

== Cultural references ==
- A nod was made to the finding of The Taking of Christ by Caravaggio in the film Ordinary Decent Criminal starring Kevin Spacey.
- The Hands of Caravaggio, an album from 2001 by electro-acoustic improvisation group M.I.M.E.O. was inspired by the painting.
- The painting was the subject of a special Easter program in 2009 in the BBC series The Private Life of a Masterpiece.
- Mel Gibson said that the cinematography in The Passion of the Christ aimed to imitate Caravaggio's style. The arrest scene in the film uses a similar perspective, lighting, and placement of figures as the painting at the moment the soldiers seize Jesus.
- The painting was used as a candidate for an RTÉ competition looking for 'Ireland's Favourite Painting'.

== See also ==
- List of paintings by Caravaggio
