= Domenico Bernini =

17th-century Italian historian

- Born: Domenico Stefano Bernini; 3 August 1657; Rome, Papal States
- Died: 3 November 1723 (aged 66); Rome, Papal States
- Resting place: Santa Maria Maggiore
- Occupations: Scholar and author
- Known for: Historia di tutte le heresie; Vita del Cavalier Gio. Lorenzo Bernini
- Parent(s): Gian Lorenzo Bernini and Caterina Bernini (née Tezio)

Academic work
- Discipline: Church history; History of art

Domenico Bernini (3 August 1657 – 3 November 1723) was an Italian scholar and author. He was the son of the artist Gian Lorenzo Bernini.

== Biography ==
Born on 3 August 1657, Domenico was the last of the eleven children born to the famed seventeenth-century artist Gian Lorenzo Bernini and his wife Caterina Tezio. He is frequently confused in older scholarship with his eldest brother, Monsignor Pietro Filippo who became a prelate and canon of Santa Maria Maggiore in Rome.

Although he had a very brief career as a Jesuit novice (1671–73), Domenico was never ordained a priest; he married sometime after 1686 and had three children. A scholar and author, he published several works related to the history of the Catholic Church. The History of the Heresies, published in four volumes between 1705 and 1717, is the best-known of his writings. The work describes in detailed fashion and chronological order the entire series of heresies that struck the Church from its foundation onward. It was very well received, reissued several times, and reviewed positively in the Acta Eruditorum. Domenico wrote also a history of the Roman Rota, the Supreme Court of the Roman Catholic Church, one of the first systematic histories of the Roman curial bureaucracy based on a rich archival documentation and illustrated with plates engraved by Hubert Vincent after Giuseppe Severoni.

Domenico's biography of his father, Vita del Cavalier Gio. Lorenzo Bernini, appeared in Rome in 1713 and is now available in its first English translation and critical edition. It is one of the most important, full-length primary sources for the life of Gian Lorenzo Bernini. Domenico Bernini died in Rome on 3 November 1723, and was buried in his family's tomb in Santa Maria Maggiore.

== Works ==
- Bernini, Domenico (1685). Memorie istoriche di ciò che hanno operato i sommi pontefici nelle guerre contra i Turchi. Rome: Gio. Battista Bussotti.
- ————— (1705–17). Historia di tutte l'Heresie. 4 vols. fol. Rome.
- ————— (1713). Vita del Cavalier Gio. Lorenzo Bernini. Rome: Rocco Bernabò.
- ————— (1717). Il tribunale della S. Ruota Romana. Rome: nella stamperia del Bernabò.
