= A Civil Action (film) =

1998 American film

- Theatrical release poster
- Directed by: Steven Zaillian
- Screenplay by: Steven Zaillian
- Based on: A Civil Action by Jonathan Harr
- Produced by: Scott Rudin; Robert Redford; Rachel Pfeffer
- Starring: John Travolta; Robert Duvall; James Gandolfini; Dan Hedaya; John Lithgow; William H. Macy; Kathleen Quinlan; Tony Shalhoub
- Cinematography: Conrad L. Hall
- Edited by: Wayne Wahrman
- Music by: Danny Elfman
- Production companies: Touchstone Pictures; Paramount Pictures; Wildwood Enterprises, Inc
- Distributed by: Buena Vista Pictures Distribution (United States and Canada); United International Pictures (International)
- Release date: December 25, 1998
- Running time: 115 minutes
- Country: United States
- Language: English
- Budget: $75 million
- Box office: $56 million

A Civil Action is a 1998 American legal drama film directed and written by Steven Zaillian and starring John Travolta with Robert Duvall, James Gandolfini, Dan Hedaya, John Lithgow, William H. Macy, Kathleen Quinlan, and Tony Shalhoub. Based on the 1995 book by Jonathan Harr, the film depicts the true story of a court case about environmental pollution that took place in Woburn, Massachusetts, in the 1980s. The film and court case revolve around the issue of trichloroethylene, an industrial solvent, and its contamination of a local aquifer. A lawsuit was filed over industrial operations that appeared to have caused fatal cases of leukemia and cancer, as well as a wide variety of other health problems, among the citizens of the city. The case involved is Anne Anderson, et al., v. Cryovac, Inc., et al.. The film was produced by Touchstone Pictures, Paramount Pictures and Wildwood Enterprises, Inc and distributed by Buena Vista Pictures Distribution in the United States and Canada and by United International Pictures internationally. The film was released on December 25, 1998 to generally positive reviews, but was a box office failure as it grossed $56 million against a $75 million budget. Duvall was nominated for the Academy Award for Best Supporting Actor for his performance.

== Plot ==
Environmental toxicants in the city of Woburn, Massachusetts, contaminate the area's water supply and become linked to a number of deaths of local children. Cocky Boston attorney Jan Schlichtmann and his small firm of personal injury lawyers are asked by Woburn resident Anne Anderson to take legal action against those responsible. After originally rejecting a seemingly unprofitable case, Jan finds a major environmental issue involving groundwater contamination that has great legal potential and realizes the local tanneries could be responsible for several deadly cases of leukemia. Jan decides to go forward against two giant corporations that own the tanneries—Beatrice Foods and W. R. Grace and Company—thinking the case could possibly earn him millions of dollars and boost his firm's reputation.

Bringing a class action lawsuit in federal court, Jan represents families who demand an apology and a clean up of contaminated areas. However, the case develops a turn of its own and takes over the lives of Jan and his firm. The lawyers for Beatrice and Grace are not easy to intimidate, a judge makes a key ruling against the plaintiffs, and soon Jan and his partners find themselves in a position where their professional and financial survival has been staked on the outcome of the case. Jan stubbornly declines settlement offers, gradually coming to believe the case is about more than just money. He allows his pride to take over, making outrageous demands and choosing he must win at all costs. Pressures take their toll, with Jan and his partners going deeply into debt.

After a lengthy trial, the jury returns a verdict in favor of Beatrice after Jan turned down an offer of $20 million from Beatrice attorney Jerry Facher during jury deliberations. The plaintiffs are forced to accept a settlement with Grace that barely covers the expense involved in trying the case, leaving Jan and his partners broke. The families are deeply disappointed, and Jan's partners dissolve their partnership, effectively breaking up the firm. Jan ends up alone, living in a small apartment and running a small-time law practice. He manages to find the last key witness to the case but lacks resources and courage to appeal the judgment. The files are archived while Jan later files for bankruptcy.

A postscript reveals the EPA, building on Jan's work on the case, later brought its own enforcement action against Beatrice and Grace, forcing them to pay millions to clean up the land and the groundwater. It takes Jan several years to settle his debts, and he now practices environmental law in New Jersey.

== Cast ==
- John Travolta as Jan Schlichtmann
- Robert Duvall as Jerry Facher
- William H. Macy as James Gordon
- Tony Shalhoub as Kevin Conway
- Kathleen Quinlan as Anne Anderson
- Željko Ivanek as Bill Crowley
- Bruce Norris as William Cheeseman
- Peter Jacobson as Neil Jacobs
- John Lithgow as Judge Walter J. Skinner
- Dan Hedaya as John Riley
- James Gandolfini as Al Love
- Stephen Fry as Dr. George F. Pinder
- Sydney Pollack as Al Eustis
- David Thornton as Richard Aufiero
- Jay Patterson as Geologist
- Daniel von Bargen as Mr. Granger
- Paul Ben-Victor as Bobby Pasqueriella
- Ned Eisenberg as Pete "Uncle Pete"
- Mary Mara as Kathy Boyer
- Denise Dowse as Judge Constance Mullen

Kathy Bates appears in an uncredited cameo in the final scene as the judge overseeing Jan's bankruptcy hearing. Rob McElhenney also appears briefly as one of three "teenagers on property," as described in the film's closing credits.

== Filming ==
The movie was shot in Boston, Massachusetts; Dedham, Massachusetts; Jamaica Plain, Massachusetts; Waltham, Massachusetts; Northbridge, Massachusetts; Palmer, Massachusetts; Fenway Park; Boston Public Garden; and Beacon Hill, Boston. The casting company hired many factory workers as extras for the film.

== Release ==
=== Box office ===
Despite showing promise on its initial limited release, A Civil Action was a box office failure on wide release, earning a domestic gross of $56 million against its $75 million budget. The film was released in competition with a number of films that became hits, earning between $120 and $290 million each, including Shakespeare in Love, The Prince of Egypt, Star Trek: Insurrection, You've Got Mail, Stepmom and Patch Adams.

=== Reception ===
On Rotten Tomatoes, A Civil Action has an approval rating of 64% based on reviews from 72 critics. The site's consensus called the film "Intelligent and unconventional". On Metacritic, the film has a score of 68 out of 100, based on reviews from 26 critics indicating "generally favorable" reviews. Audiences surveyed by CinemaScore gave the film a grade B on scale of A to F.

Roger Ebert of the Chicago Sun-Times gave the film three and a half out of four stars and wrote: "Civil Action is like John Grisham for grownups".
