= History of County Wexford (1914–1923) =

Part of the history of County Wexford, Ireland

County Wexford (Irish: Contae Loch Garman) is a county located in the south-east of Ireland. The period 1916–1923 was one of the most turbulent in the county's history. In 1914 Ireland was still part of the United Kingdom. During World War I much war-related activity took place in County Wexford, especially in Wexford's coastal waters. A number of men enlisted in the British Army from Co. Wexford died in the land war in Europe. In 1916 Wexford Rebels seized the town of Enniscorthy during the Easter Rising. Co. Wexford was very active throughout the War of Independence and later fought an especially bloody Irish Civil War.

== Enniscorthy 1916 ==
In 1916, a small rising occurred at Enniscorthy on cue with that at Dublin. On Thursday, 27 April 1916, Enniscorthy town was taken over by about 600 armed patriots, almost without opposition in a surprise attack. They were led by Robert Brennan (journalist) (1881–1964). The rebels consisted primarily of Irish Volunteers, supplemented by members of Fianna Éireann and Cumann na mBan. Seamus Doyle and Seán Etchingham were next in command. The patriots made the Athenaeum Theatre, near Enniscorthy Castle, their headquarters, taking over the town and blocking the roads and the railway line. They surrounded the R.I.C. barracks and though shots were fired, no real attempt was made to take the barracks. Meanwhile, a force under Peter Paul Galligan occupied the town of Ferns and some northern parts of the county. The British responded by sending a force of more than 1,000 men to retake Enniscorthy, under the command of G.A. French. On Saturday, 29 April 1916, news of the general surrender in Dublin reached Enniscorthy. The rebels refused to believe it. They refused the demand to surrender and required also that the Dublin surrender be confirmed to them. They would only surrender if ordered to do so by Patrick Pearse. The next day, 30 April 1916, the British escorted two patriots, Seamus Doyle and Seán R. Etchingham, to Dublin to consult Pearse in Arbor Hill Prison. The order to surrender was obtained. On Monday, 1 May 1916, the Enniscorthy patriots surrendered unconditionally. There had been no fatalities and relatively little damage to property. Some of the leaders, including Robert Brennan, were sentenced to death, but all had their sentences commuted. Furlong and Hayes state that "270 were arrested, of whom 150 were interned at Frongoch in north Wales". Frongoch internment camp was formerly a German prisoner-of-war camp. It was cleared of German prisoners to accommodate the Irish patriots involved in the Easter Rising, the first of whom arrived there 9 June 1916. The camp was located at Frongoch, three miles from the town of Bala in Merionethshire, North Wales.

Michael O'Hanrahan of New Ross, a member of Sinn Féin, of the IRB and of the Irish Volunteers, who played a prominent role in the Easter Rising at Jacob's Biscuit Factory, Dublin, was executed 4 May 1916 at Dublin.

== World War I ==
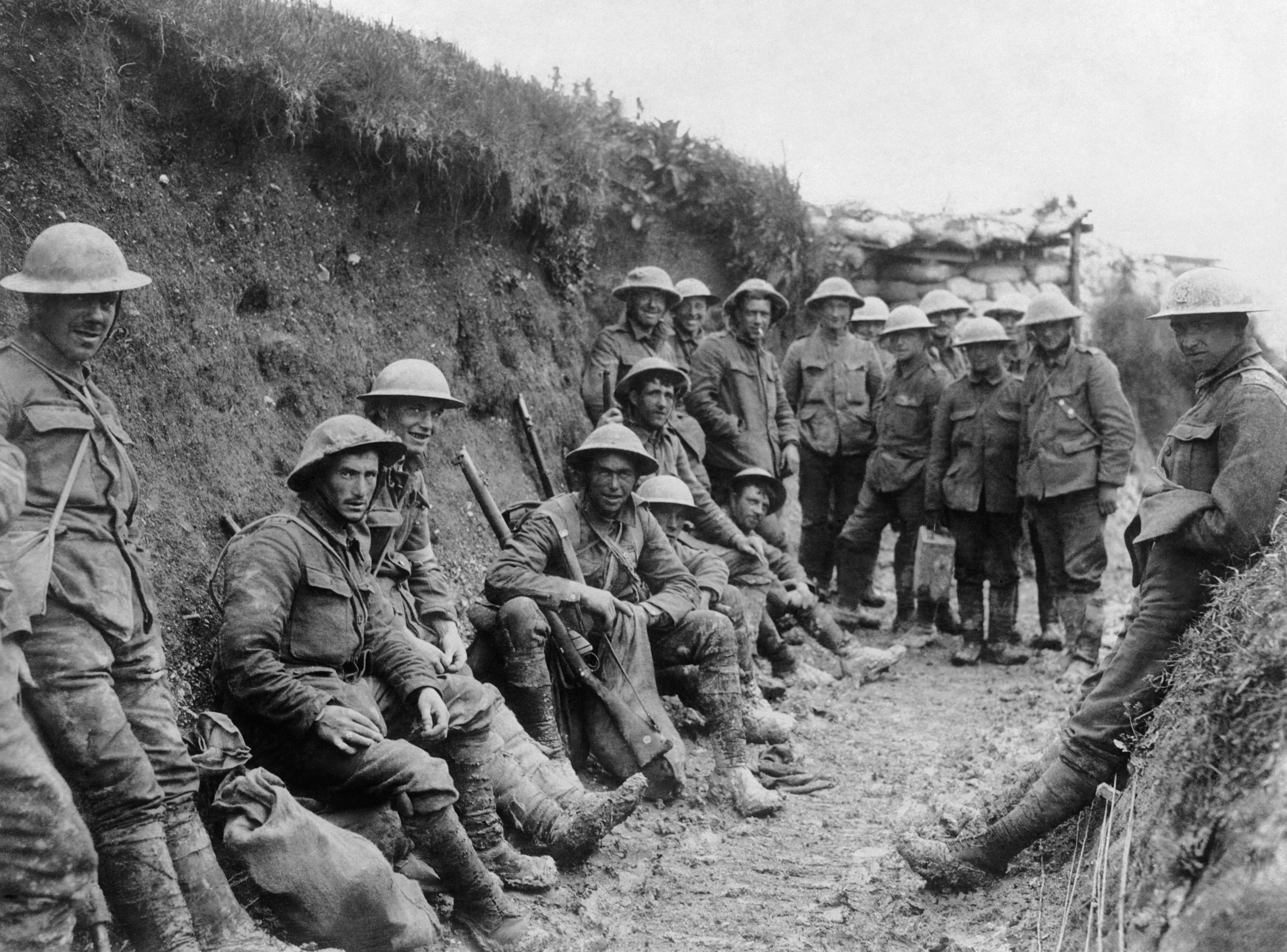
In the trenches: Royal Irish Rifles in a communications trench on the first day on the Somme, 1 July 1916. Many men from Co. Wexford belonged to this Regiment.

During World War I, a large number of men from Co. Wexford fought and died on the Continent. The local newspapers of the period are full of the obituaries of those who died. Throughout the War Ireland remained under British rule. At least 504 men from Co. Wexford, enlisted in the British Army, died fighting in the land war. German U-boats were very active off Wexford's southern coast during the War. Royal Naval Air Service airships were based at Johnstown Castle, and were primarily used to deal with the U-boat threat – but with limited success. However, later, from 25 February 1918, American seaplanes operating out of United States Naval Air Station Wexford cleared the shipping lanes of U-boats in a short period of time. One famous U-boat that operated off Wexford's coasts was U-20, commanded by Walther Schwieger (d. 1917). On 6 May 1915 it torpedoed and sunk SS Centurion off the south Wexford coast, but Schwieger allowed the 44-man crew to escape to safety. Later that same day he also sunk SS Candidate, but its crew was rescued by a friendly ship. The next day, this same U-boat infamously torpedoed and sunk RMS Lusitania, a large passenger liner, off the Old Head of Kinsale, Co. Cork, killing 1,198 of the 1,959 people on board – including many Americans, which partially influenced their entry into the War. The SS Antony was torpedoed and sunk by a different U-boat 17 March 1917 off the south Wexford coast, with the loss of 55 persons. The main shipping route between Britain (primarily to the port of Liverpool) and America passed through Wexford coastal waters. Britain was incredibly dependent on this route for supplies for its War effort. A huge number of ships were sunk off Wexford's coasts during the War – 1915 and 1917 being the worst years. The area of sea around Tuskar Rock came to be referred to as "The Graveyard" – the graveyard of Allied ships. A number of German U-boats were also sunk in Wexford coastal waters. One of these was SM UC-44, sunk off the Hook Peninsula on 4 August 1917 by a mine. The only survivor was the commander, Kurt Tebbenjohanns, who escaped as he was in the conning tower at the time. The rest of the crew – 28 men – died. They had been tricked by false reports from the British that the minefield had been cleared. Another U-boat sunk off the Wexford coast was SM UC-33. It was sunk by a British patrol boat off Tuskar Rock in St George's Channel, 26 September 1917. Only one man, who turned out to be the commander, Alfred Arnold, was rescued. The other 27 members of the crew died. U-104 was also sunk further off the south Wexford coast, 25 April 1918 – 41 men died and 1 survived.

== Death of John Redmond and the first Dáil ==
John Redmond, leader of the Irish Parliamentary Party, died at London, 6 March 1918. He was interred in the Redmond family vault at St John's Graveyard, John Street, Wexford, later that same month. A large crowd attended his funeral. The executions of the Dublin-based patriots that followed the Easter Rising, and the resultant change in public opinion, meant that Redmond's Party and many of his political aspirations had become effectively redundant at the time of his death. It was never to rise to prominence again and it was wiped out by Sinn Féin at the 1918 General Election for the House of Commons at Westminster – when 73 out of a total of 105 seats went to the Sinn Féin party. At that Election, Co. Wexford returned two Sinn Féin candidates, James Ryan and Roger Sweetman – who replaced the Redmondites who had previously held these seats, Peter Ffrench and Thomas Esmonde. However, Sinn Féin refused to take their seats in the British Parliament. Instead they set up their own Parliament, Dáil Éireann, at Dublin, in direct opposition to the British one at London, and it met 21 January 1919 for the first time. Only members of Sinn Féin attended. Members who formed the First Dáil were those Sinn Féin candidates elected 1918, but who had refused to take their seats in London – only 29 Sinn Féin members attended, as most of the other 44 were in prison or, in a few cases, "on the run". The Dáil elected Éamon de Valera, as President of the Republic (that is, of the Republic that had been proclaimed Easter 1916). De Valera had been born in 1882 at New York City, to an Irish mother and a Cuban father (of Spanish descent). He had been brought to Ireland when about three years old and was raised there. The Dáil set up a Department of Defence, represented by the Irish Republican Army (I.R.A.). Michael Collins and Cathal Brugha were the main leaders of the I.R.A. World War 1 had effectively ended 11 November 1918 with the signing of the armistice of that date. However, while peace came to Europe, troubled times lay ahead for Co. Wexford and Ireland as a whole. On the same day that the First Dáil met, the Irish War of Independence began.

== Irish War of Independence (1919–1921) and the Treaty ==
The Irish War of Independence (1919–1921) was fought by the I.R.A. in an attempt to end British rule of Ireland and thereby establish an independent Irish state. It was a guerrilla war. Though not as much activity took place in Co. Wexford as in some parts of Ireland, like Dublin and Munster, the county was still very much involved. The War in Co. Wexford saw numerous attacks on Royal Irish Constabulary (R.I.C.) Barracks. Furlong and Hayes state that "Amongst the Royal Irish Constabulary barracks in Co. Wexford that were attacked, burned or demolished were those of Clonroche, Ferns, Kilmore, Oylegate [Oilgate], Ballinaboola, Tintern, Duncormick, Blackwater, Ballybrazil near Campile, Castlebridge, Ballycanew and Gorey." Fethard and Arthurstown R.I.C. Barracks were also burned. Ballywilliam R.I.C. Barracks was burned, 5 April 1920. In December 1920, a major attack was made on the R.I.C. Barracks at Foulksmills. New Ross R.I.C. Barracks was attacked, 31 March 1921, and again in June 1921. This is just a partial list of R.I.C. Barracks attacked in Co. Wexford. Some attacks on R.I.C. Barracks were made in an effort to procure arms, also the cause of many attacks on other premises. Many of the R.I.C. Barracks attacked were abandoned by the R.I.C., who though an armed force, were unable to defend them. They were then stationed in the larger towns where they could more easily defend themselves by virtue of their larger numbers.

Post Offices were also attacked and some attacks on the Railways also occurred. An I.R.A. newspaper, called An tOglach, was distributed. A hastily assembled and undisciplined force called the Black and Tans were soon introduced to Ireland and Co. Wexford, by the British, to deal with the problem. Furlong and Hayes state that, from that point on, "Raids and counter-raids, burning of Sinn Féin members' properties, revenges, ambushes, assassinations and intimidation were persistent occurrences." As alluded to, constant raids on peoples homes – often of those who had little to do with the fighting – was a big feature of the Black and Tans' activities in Co. Wexford, who drove around the county in vehicles called Crossley Tenders on such 'missions'. The occupants were usually badly treated. The Black and Tans (or Tans as they were often called) quickly became extremely unpopular. Their repulsive behaviour and methods alienated Co. Wexford people further, ensuring that they would never be forgotten. Even the British King, George V, was outraged at their actions. Many people were imprisoned. Many of these prisoners were mistreated, some were tortured, and some went on hunger strike. One of the many locations where men from Co. Wexford were imprisoned was at Kilworth Camp, Co. Cork.

Probably the most high-profile death of the War in Co. Wexford was that of Percival Lea-Wilson, a District Inspector in the R.I.C. who was stationed at Gorey. He was shot dead by the I.R.A. outside his Gorey home on 15 June 1920, on the orders of Michael Collins. At the end of the Easter Rising, Collins had allegedly seen Lea-Wilson (then stationed at Dublin) mistreating prisoners, including Thomas Clarke, and Collins had vowed to avenge the perceived injustice. There were six I.R.A. men involved in the shooting of Lea-Wilson – they were Frank Thornton, Liam Tobin, both of whom travelled from Dublin, Jack Whelan, from Enniscorthy, Joe McMahon, from Co. Clare (but then working at Enniscorthy), Michael McGrath from Co. Wexford and Michael Sinnott, from Enniscorthy, who drove the car. Lea-Wilson features in the movie Michael Collins. A delayed sequel to this series of events was that Lea-Wilson's widow, paediatrician Dr Marie Lea-Wilson, a Roman Catholic, donated a masterpiece The Taking of Christ to a religious order in Dublin in gratitude for their support where it subsequently hung for many decades in the refectory until its rediscovery in 1991.

The greatest number of casualties of the War in Co. Wexford occurred on 12 October 1920, when 5 men were killed, 5 more were severely injured, and 4 more less-severely injured, when explosives being prepared accidentally detonated in an old unoccupied house located at St. Kearns, Saltmills. A monument was later erected nearby to their memory, which can still be seen today. One of the survivors was Michael Conway, of Curraghmore, Ballycullane. On 4 January 1921, Co. Wexford was placed under Martial law. The Irish War of Independence ended on 11 July 1921 – when a truce was agreed by both sides. The conflict had reached a stalemate. In mid-October 1921, despite the truce, 35 men escaped from Kilworth Camp, Co. Cork, where they had been imprisoned. A number of these men were from Co. Wexford.

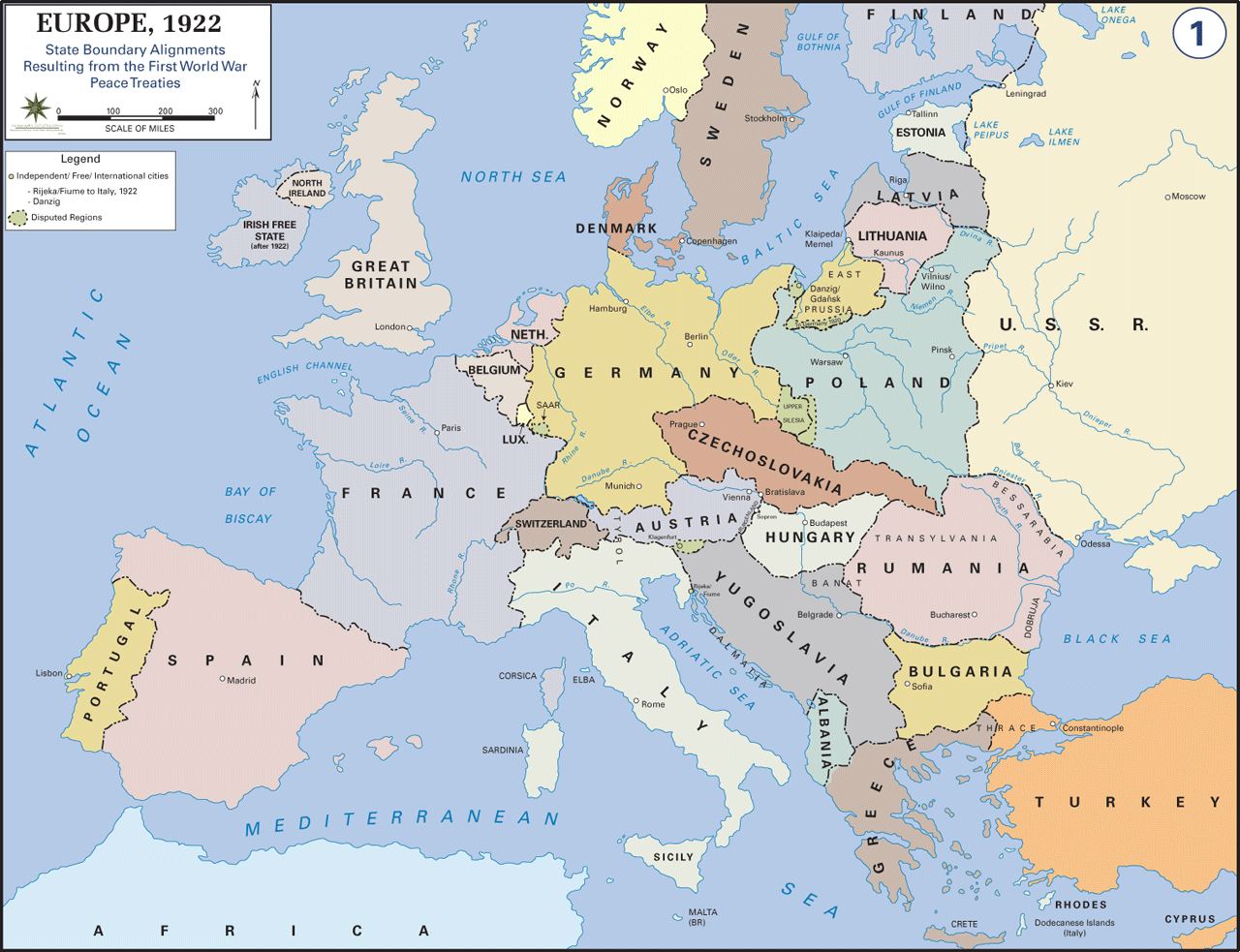
Europe in 1922- showing the newly formed Irish Free State.

After the signing of the Anglo-Irish Treaty, 6 December 1921, and its subsequent ratification on 7 January 1922 by the Dáil, twenty-six of thirty-two counties of Ireland formed the Irish Free State – a state that included Co. Wexford. Six northern counties chose shortly afterwards to remain as part of the British state – as they had a Protestant majority that identified itself as British. However, these six counties also included a substantial miniority who saw themselves as Irish, who now felt abandoned and dissatisfied at the new situation. From 1922 onwards, therefore, with the formation of the Irish Free State, what is today just calledIreland, has been self-governing though on paper it was not yet fully independent as some details were still left outstanding. Some aspects of the Treaty were deeply unpopular. The Dáil-controlled I.R.A. split into pro-Treaty and anti-Treaty forces. The pro-Treaty side continued in government, led by Michael Collins, and controlled the Free State Army. This consisted of pro-Treaty I.R.A. and other recruits. Those against the Treaty withdrew from the Dáil and fought a war, the Irish Civil War (1922–1923), against these government forces. The anti-Treaty side are usually referred to as Republicans, the anti-Treaty I.R.A., or simply the I.R.A. (which de facto they were from that point forward).

Michael Collins visited Wexford town 8–9 April 1922 – he stayed at the Talbot Hotel on the Quay. He had his photo taken. He visited Pierces' Foundry – a factory that was well known for manufacturing agricultural machinery and that was a large employer in Wexford town. He made a speech at St. Peter's Square to a large crowd. Many of the trains of those travelling to see him were disrupted en route by anti-Treaty I.R.A. activities, indicating the unrest already too evident in the county as a result of recent political developments. During his speech at Wexford Collins stated:

It is the departure of British troops that matters. It is this departure that makes us free from their interference, this departure is the one indispensable factor in our freedom. No good can come of a division among ourselves, from civil war, from mutiny ...

== Irish Civil War (1922–1923) ==
On 28 June 1922 the Irish Civil War (1922–1923) began. Collins was now back in Dublin. In April 1922, a group of anti-Treaty IRA, led by Rory O'Connor, had occupied the Four Courts at Dublin. O'Connor had been a frequent visitor to Co. Wexford during the previous number of years. On 28 June 1922 Collins gave the order to bombard the Four Courts with artillery shells in an attempt to remove them. He succeeded. These were the opening shots of the Civil War. In the process the Four Courts was largely destroyed, but it was later repaired and re-built. The Four Courts had been used to house many important historical documents of interest to Co. Wexford and Ireland as a whole. The documents dated back hundreds of years, but they were almost all entirely destroyed in this action.

Once the Four Courts had fallen, the Eastern Command of the Irish National Army sent a group known as the Wexford Column to control the southeastern coast. The Wexford Column, consisting of 230 men, 16 officers, 2 armoured cars and 4 Lewis guns, left Dublin on 8 July 1922. After securing the town of Gorey, the column moved to Enniscorthy where they met stiff opposition. Anti-treaty forces pinned the column down on Enniscorthy bridge using their advantage from the battlements of Enniscorthy Castle. After 3 days of fighting, the town was taken by the National Army. The column split and a group was sent to Wexford. Little resistance was met in Wexford and the National Army set its headquarters up in the Talbot Hotel, where Collins had stayed only a few months before.

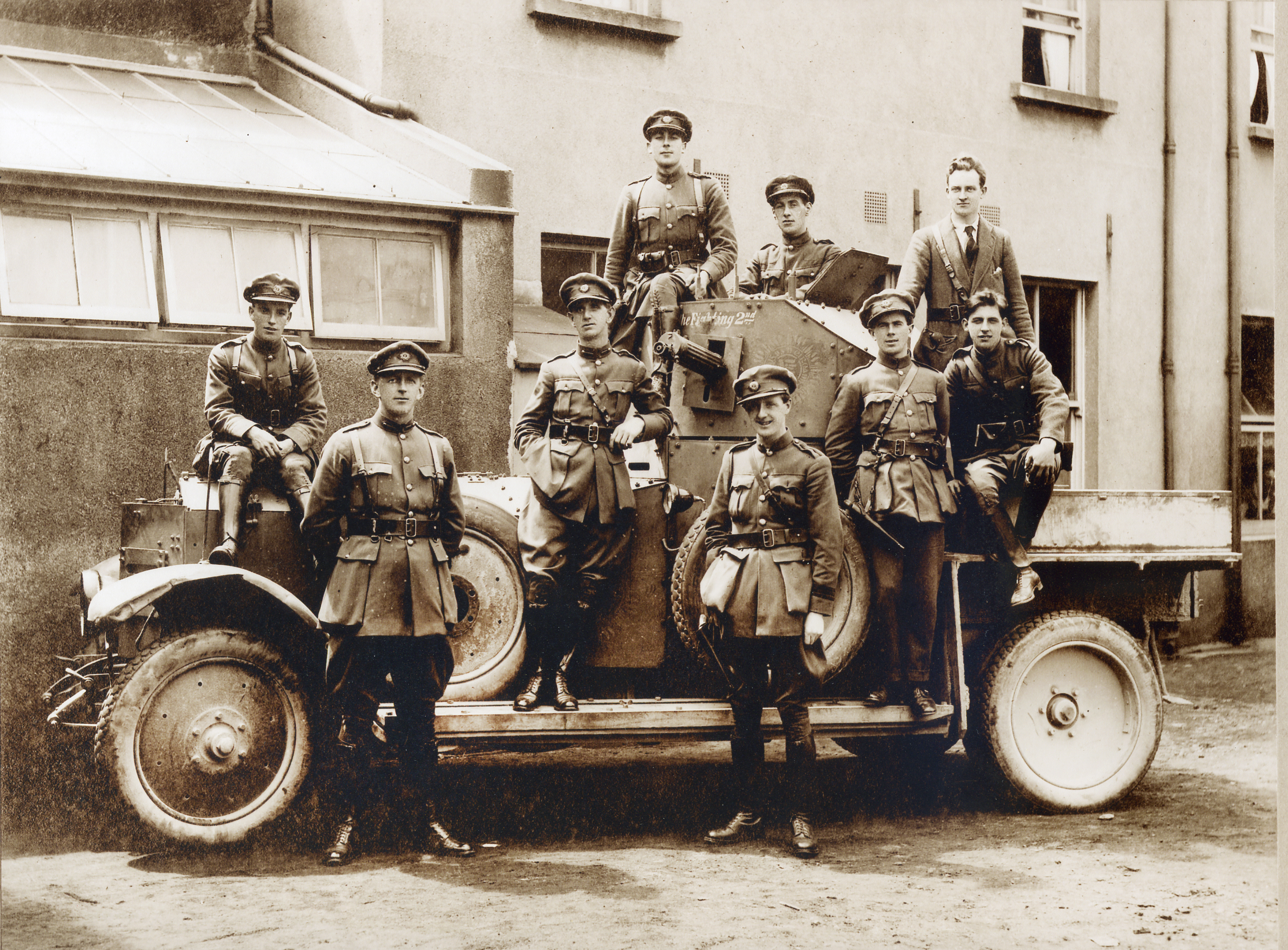
Capt. Charles McAlister (standing right) and members of the "Wexford Column" of the Irish National Army with "The Fighting 2nd" armoured car in front of their headquarters, The Talbot Hotel, Wexford, July 1922

During the Irish Civil War, the county was very much involved. Again it was a guerrilla war. Many people lost their lives on both sides. Many large houses were burned and destroyed – most notably Castleboro House (February 1923), owned by the Carews, Wilton (March 1923), owned by the Alcocks, and Ballynastragh (March 1923), owned by the Esmondes.

After the signing of the Treaty, the I.R.A. as a whole in Co. Wexford was divided. The North Wexford and South Wicklow Brigade of the I.R.A., led by Joseph Cummins, supported the Treaty, but the South Wexford Brigade of the I.R.A., led by Thomas O'Sullivan, opposed it. Both Brigades, who had fought side by side during the Irish War of Independence, now fought each other. According to Kissane, Wexford was a "county where there was more fighting during the civil war than during the War of Independence." Furlong and Hayes concur, stating that "The split between anti-treaty and pro-treaty adherents was country-wide but Co. Wexford became one of the most violent counties in the Civil War. The conflict which scarred and divided families followed the pattern of guerrilla warfare. It was so viciously fought that veterans of the 1916 and 1921 struggle wondered why County Wexford, by comparison, had been so quiet in the previous three years." Furlong and Hayes continue by stating that "At first the anti-treaty forces controlled all Wexford including Wexford town, Gorey and Enniscorthy. They were dislodged by the Free State army, but groups waged continuous warfare against the newly-recruited soldiers, ambushing transports, hitting barracks, blowing up bridges, as at Taylorstown Bridge, or burning them as at the Redmond Bridge in Carcur. Retaliation killings, executions, murders, accompanied the military actions and military casualties ..." The anti-Treaty I.R.A. in the county constantly attacked the county's railway network – often referred to as the 'War on the Railways' – in an effort to make the business of government impossible for those running the new Free State. A vicious circle of reprisal killings soon ensued.

On 24 July 1922, an anti-Treaty I.R.A. unit ambushed a train near the railway station at Killurin, County Wexford in an effort to free a large group of prisoners that it was transporting to Dublin under armed guard. This anti-Treaty I.R.A. unit opened fire on the carriages containing the Free State soldiers. The train also carried regular passengers, but these were in separate carriages, and were unharmed. The attempt failed, but three Free State soldiers were killed. On 10 October 1922, a senior Free State army officer, Commandant Peter Doyle, of Ballinakill, Marshalstown, was shot in the grounds of St. Aidan's Cathedral, Enniscorthy, by anti-Treaty I.R.A. after mass. Five girls were injured in the process, two of them seriously. In November 1922, members of the South Wexford Brigade I.R.A. (anti-Treaty) ambushed a Lorry near Begerin, Old Ross, carrying Free State soldiers, killing one and wounding seven others. On 13 March 1923, three anti-Treaty I.R.A. prisoners held in Wexford Jail were executed by the Free State side. They were James Parle (of Clovervalley, Taghmon), John Creane (of Clonerane, Taghmon), and Patrick Hogan (of William Street, Wexford). They had been arrested 15 February 1923 for possession of firearms. Significantly, James Parle was second in command of Robert (or 'Bob') Lambert's Flying column – an anti-Treaty I.R.A. unit that operated in the Wexford town area, led by Bob Lambert. Bob Lambert was from Kyle, Crossabeg – hence this unit was referred to as the Kyle Flying Column. On 23 March 1923 three Free State soldiers were taken by anti-Treaty I.R.A. from a Public House at Ballagh, parish of Adamstown. They were taken to the village of Adamstown where they were shot dead later that night or early next morning, on 24 March 1923. The 3 men were Parick Horan (of Co. Kilkenny), Edward O'Gorman (of Co. Kilkenny), and Thomas Jones (of Dublin). A fourth Free State soldier, John Croke, was badly wounded when he was shot in the leg when he resisted the anti-Treaty I.R.A. as they initially entered the Pub. It is unclear what happened to a fifth soldier mentioned in the Army Reports, referred to as 'Vol. Keane'. This was a reprisal killing for the recent execution of Parle, Creane and Hogan. The next day, 25 March 1923, Free State soldiers shot dead Michael Furlong (of Ballagh) at Oldcourt, in the same parish, as they suspected that he was an anti-Treaty I.R.A. member (as he had fought in the recent Irish War of Independence in the I.R.A. – referred to, after the start of the Civil War, as the 'Old I.R.A.'). On 22 June 1923, Michael Radford of the South Wexford Brigade I.R.A. (anti-Treaty) was shot dead by Free State soldiers at Ballybuick, Tomhaggard. There were a number of other killings also. Some of these were stated to be 'accidental' – of which some genuinely were accidents and of which some were not. During all of this time the Railways were being attacked – many locations on numerous occasions, such as Palace East Station and Killurin Railway Station. A number of large houses were burnt down by anti-Treaty I.R.A. units, as alluded to previously – allegedly because they were used to billet Free State troops. This was certainly true in some cases, but some were victims of the bitterness of war. Free State soldiers also imprisoned many suspects.

The anti-Treaty side declared a nationwide ceasefire, 30 April 1923. On 24 May 1923 the War ended, as anti-Treaty I.R.A. units were ordered to dump their arms, which most of them did. The Free State side had won. Normal political activity began to take hold in Ireland from this period forward.

== Sources ==
- Coogan, Tim Pat. Michael Collins – A Biography. UK: Arrow Books, 1990–91. ISBN 0-09-968580-9.
- Furlong, Nicholas. A History of County Wexford. Dublin: Gill & MacMillan, 2003. ISBN 0-7171-3461-X.
- Furlong, Nicholas and John Hayes. County Wexford in the Rare Oul' Times. Vol. IV. 1910–1924. Wexford: Old Distillery Press, 2005. ISBN 0-9512812-3-2.
- Gibson, R.H., and Maurice Prendergast. The German Submarine War 1914–1918. Reprint of 1st Ed. of 1931. UK: Periscope Publishing Ltd, 2002. ISBN 1-904381-08-1.
- Grant, Robert M. U-boats Destroyed: The Effect of Anti-submarine Warfare 1914–1918. Reprint 1964 Ed. Penzance: Periscope Publishing Ltd, 2002. ISBN 1-904381-00-6.
- Kissane, Bill. The Politics of the Irish Civil War. UK: Oxford University Press, 2005. ISBN 0-19-927355-3.
- Ryan, Annie. Comrades: Inside the War of Independence. Dublin: Liberties Press, 2007. ISBN 978-1-905483-14-3.
- Whelan, K., ed., and W. Nolan, assoc. ed. Wexford: History and Society. Dublin: Geography Publications, 1987. ISBN 0-906602-06-8.
