= Arrest of Jesus =

Pivotal event in Christianity recorded in the canonical gospels

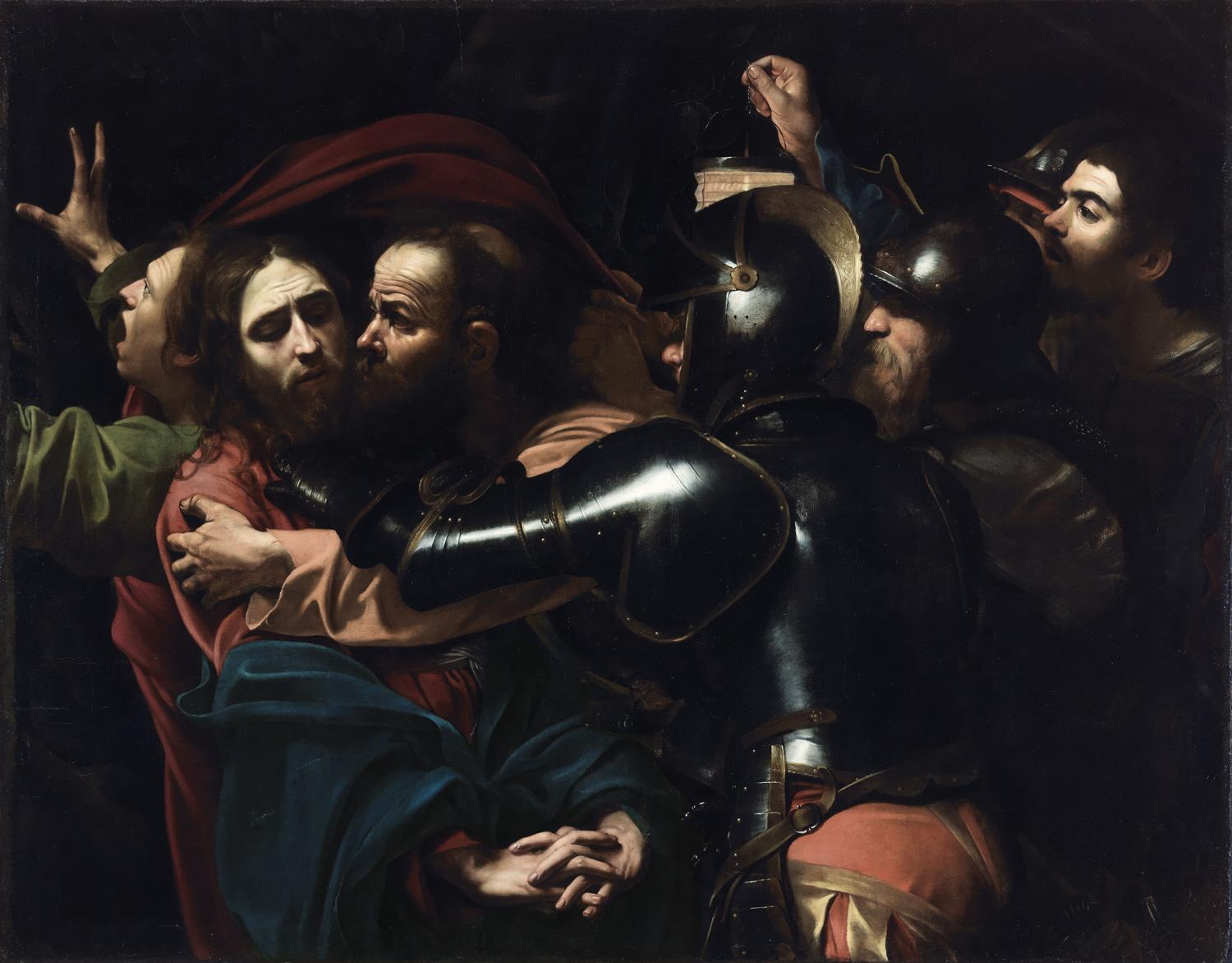
The Taking of Christ by Caravaggio, 1602

The arrest of Jesus was a pivotal event in Christianity recorded in the canonical gospels. It occurred shortly after the Last Supper (during which Jesus gave his final sermon), and immediately after the kiss of Judas, which is traditionally said to have been an act of betrayal since Judas made a deal with the chief priests to arrest Jesus. The event ultimately led, in the Gospel accounts, to Jesus's crucifixion.

The arrest led immediately to his trial before the Sanhedrin, during which they condemned him to death and handed him to Pontius Pilate the following morning. In Christian theology, the events from the Last Supper until the crucifixion and resurrection of Jesus are referred to as the Passion.

In the New Testament, all four Gospels conclude with an extended narrative of Jesus's arrest, trial, crucifixion, burial, and resurrection. In each Gospel, these five events in the life of Jesus are treated with more intense detail than any other portion of that Gospel's narrative. Scholars note that the reader receives an almost hour-by-hour account of what is happening.

== Biblical narrative ==
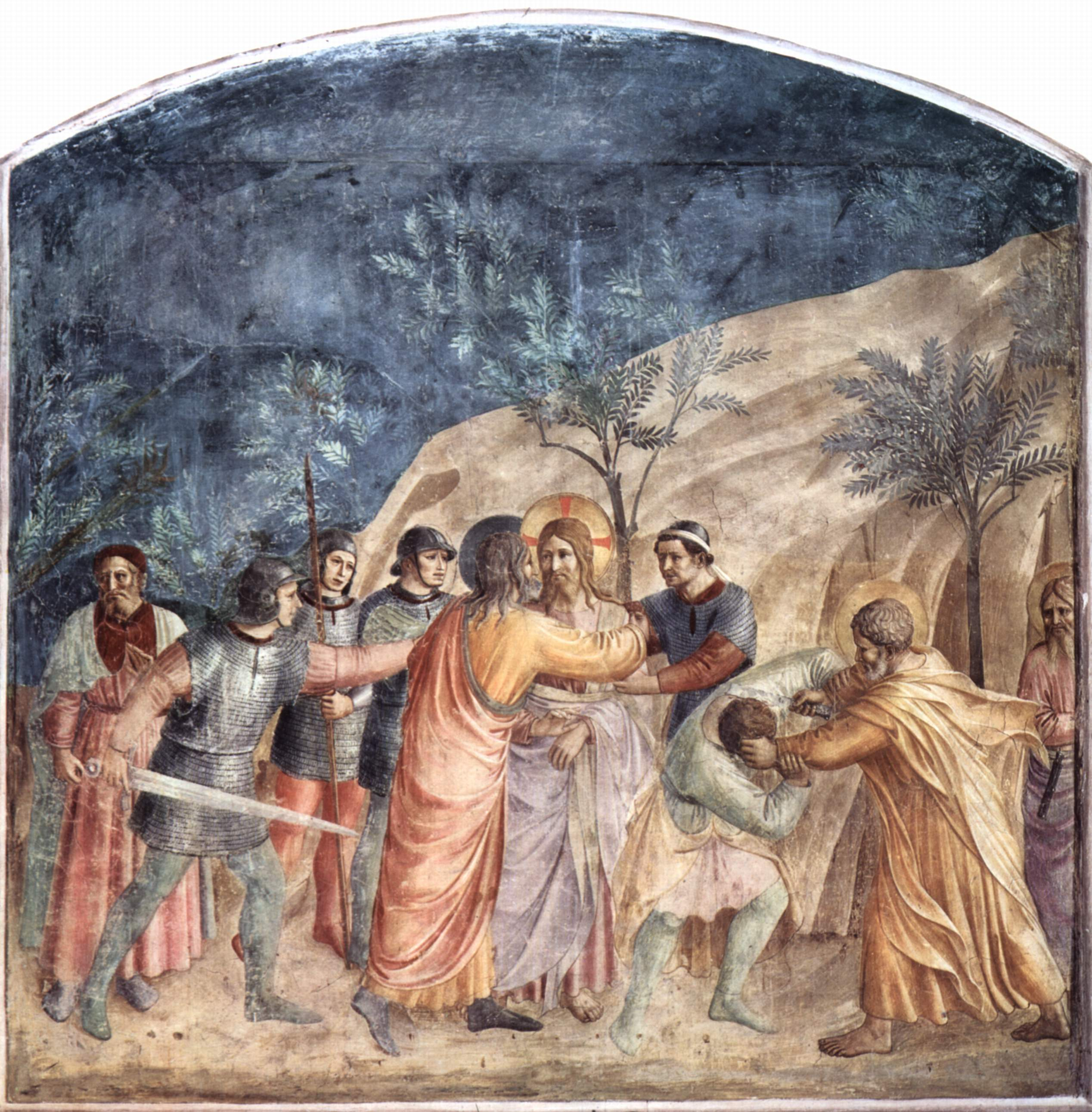
The Capture of Christ by Fra Angelico, c. 1440, depicting Judas and Peter, cutting the ear of Malchus, the servant of Caiaphas

John 7:30 and 32 refer to early attempts to arrest Jesus which were unsuccessful. Luke 4:29 recounts that "everyone in the synagogue" in Nazareth laid hold of Jesus and "dragged him out of town", but he escaped and continued "on his way".

According to the canonical gospels, after the Last Supper, Jesus and his disciples went out to Gethsemane, a garden located at the edge of the Kidron Valley, thought by scholars to probably have been an olive grove. Once there, he is described as leaving the group so that he could pray privately.

The synoptics state that Jesus asked God for the burden of death by crucifixion to save humankind be taken from him, though still leaving the final choice to God. Luke states that an angel appeared and strengthened Jesus, who then accepted God's will and returned to his disciples. The synoptics state that the three disciples that were with Jesus had fallen asleep, and that Jesus criticized them for failing to stay awake even for an hour, suggesting that they pray so that they could avoid temptation.

At that point, Judas gave Jesus a kiss, as a pre-arranged sign to those that had accompanied Judas as to who Jesus was. Having been identified, the officers arrested Jesus, although one of Jesus's disciples attempted to stop them with a sword and cut off the ear of one of the arresting officers. The Gospel of John specifies that was Simon Peter and identifies the wounded officer with Malchus, the servant of Caiaphas, the High Priest of Israel. Luke adds that Jesus healed the wound. John, Matthew, and Luke state that Jesus criticized the violent act, insisting that they do not resist Jesus's arrest. In Matthew, Jesus made the well known statement "all who live by the sword, shall die by the sword". Roman soldiers only help to carry out the arrest in the Gospel of John. Judas leads the arresting party to Jesus, but rather than Judas pointing out Jesus, John has Jesus himself, "knowing all that was to happen to him", ask them whom they are looking for; when they say "Jesus of Nazareth", he replies "I am he", at which point all members of the arrest party went backward and fell to the ground.

Only in the earliest version of Jesus's capture, appearing in the Gospel of Mark 14:51–52, is there any mention of a fleeing naked young man.

The arrest of Jesus and Judas' role in acting as a guide to those arresting him are subsequently referred to by Peter in Acts 1:16.

== Gallery of art ==
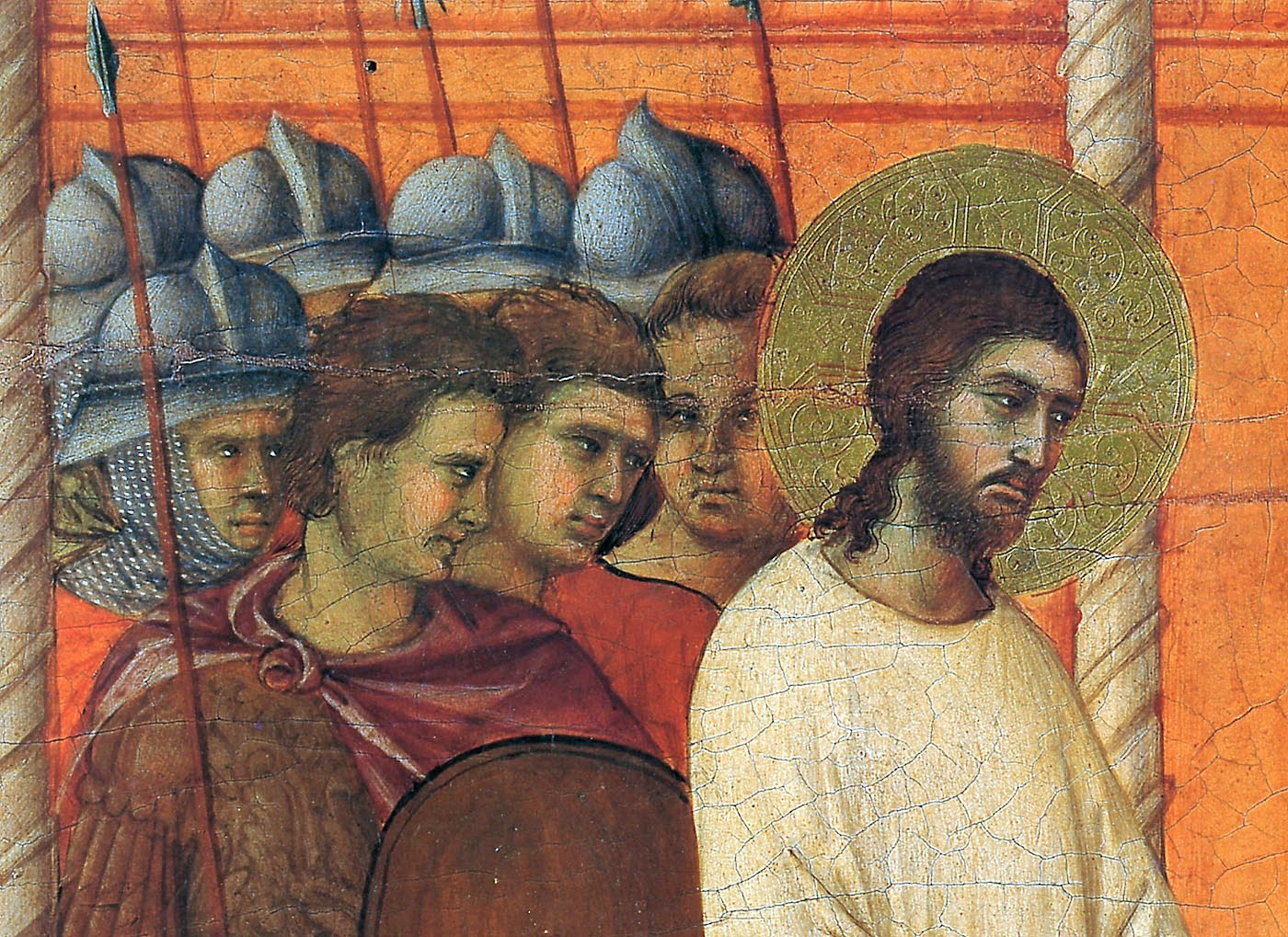
From the Maestà by Duccio, 1308–1311

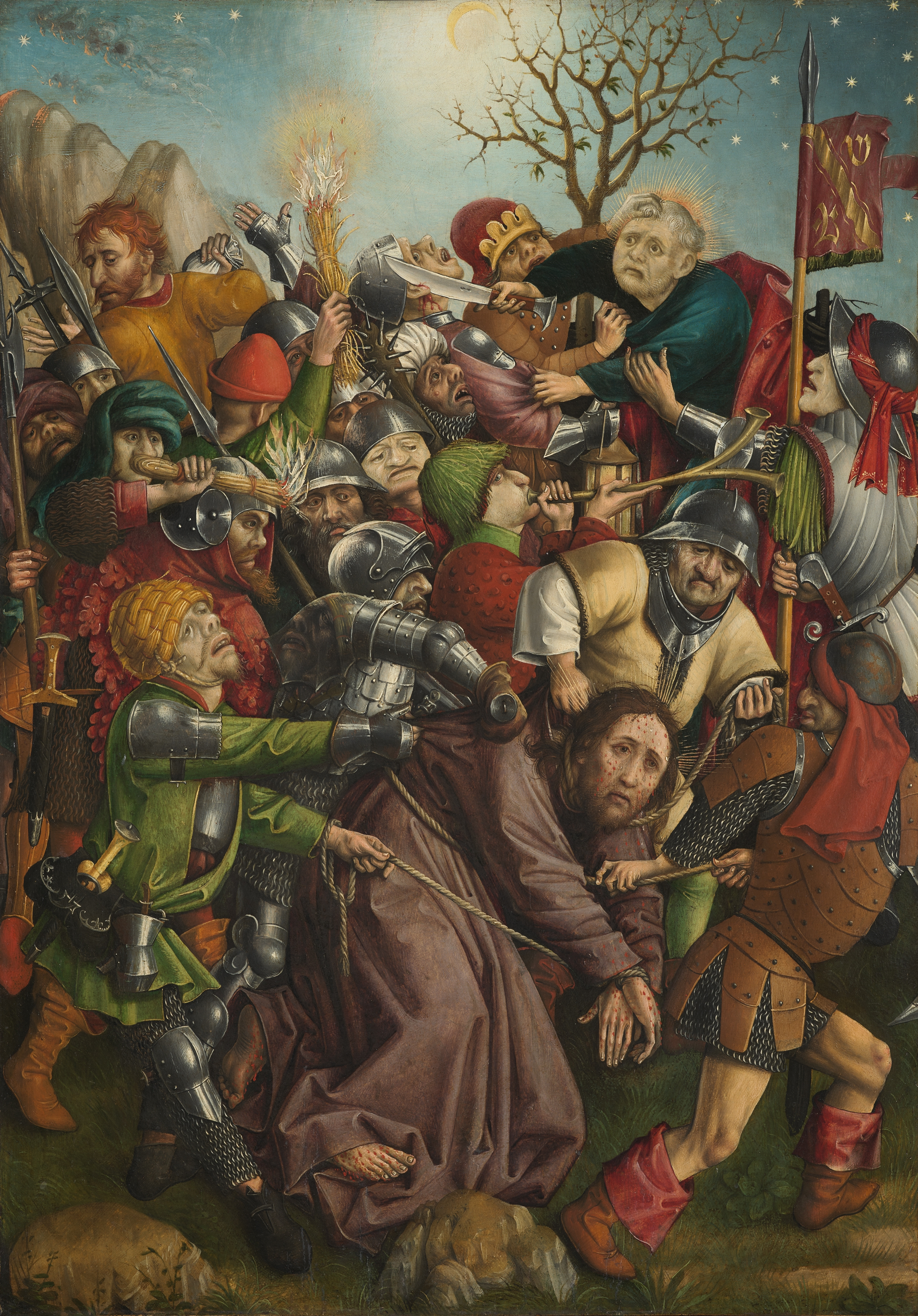
from the Karlsruhe Passion, c. 1450-55

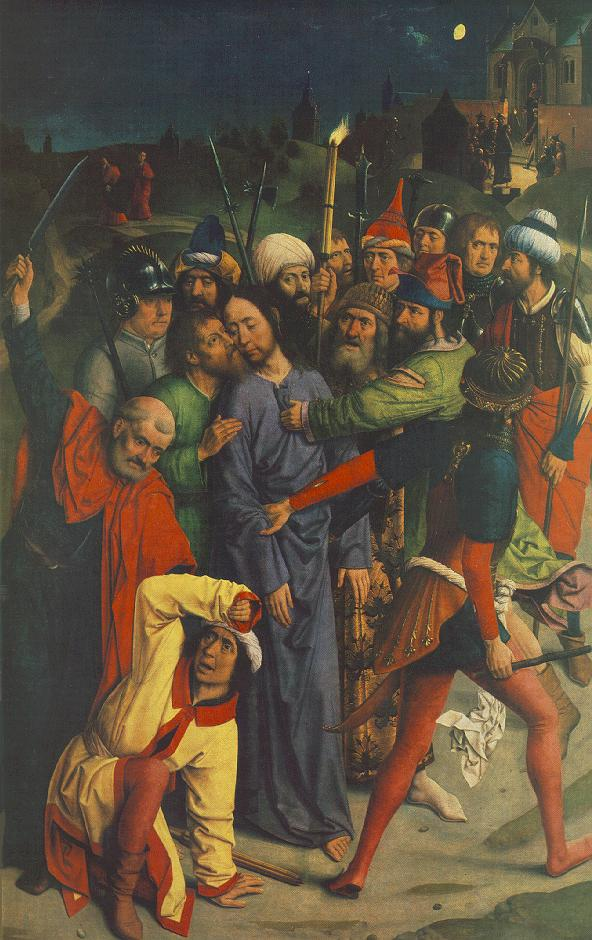
Dieric Bouts, c. 1450–1460

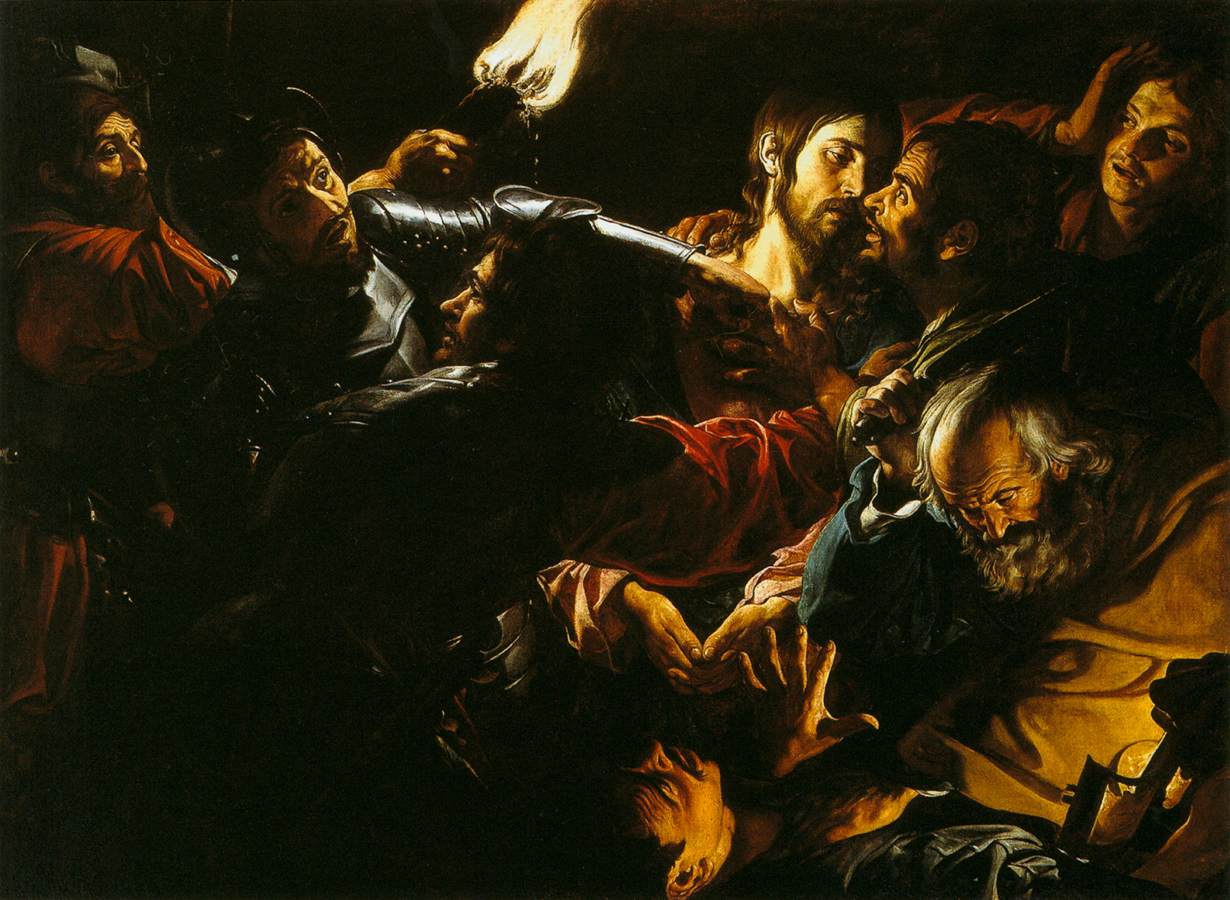
The Taking of Christ by Gerard Douffet, c. 1620

== See also ==
- Chronology of Jesus
- Life of Jesus in the New Testament
