= Sergio Benedetti =

Italian art historian

Sergio Benedetti OMRI
- Born: Sergio Adriano Benedetti; 28 October 1942; Addis Ababa, Italian East Africa
- Died: 24 January 2018 (aged 75); Florence, Italy
- Spouse: Ita Benedetti (née Collins) (m. 1970; div. 2007)
- Children: 2

Sergio Adriano Benedetti (28 October 1942 – 24 January 2018) was an Italian art historian and formerly Head Curator and Keeper of the Collection of the National Gallery of Ireland. Born in East Africa, Benedetti grew up in Florence, where he retired. Educated in Florence and Rome, Benedetti's area of specialization was the conservation of Italian Baroque paintings.

He studied at the Istituto Centrale del Restauro in Rome, called by the New York Times "the world's oldest and most prestigious school of art conservation." As a freelance restorer in Italy, Benedetti had worked on hundreds of paintings and frescoes. His wife was Irish, and when he saw an ad for a restorer at the National Gallery in Ireland, he applied.

The art historian Rossella Vodret referred to Benedetti as ""a very serious scholar and an incredibly sunny person".

== Career at the National Gallery of Ireland ==
Hired in 1977, Benedetti was one of the first professional conservators hired by the National Gallery, where he worked for 30 years. He conserved and conducted research on important paintings in the museum's collection, including Bartolomé Estaban Murillo’s The Meeting of Jacob and Rachel (c.1660-65). Benedetti also played a role in the acquisition of Antonio Canova's Amorino (1789-91), an important Neo-classical sculpture, which had been commissioned in Ireland by a banker, but had been lost for over a century, until it was discovered the UK.

Benedetti is best known for his rediscovery of the Baroque masterpiece, The Taking of Christ by Michelangelo Merisi da Caravaggio in 1990. Benedetti recognized the painting's quality in a building owned by the Jesuit Fathers in Dublin, and he was ultimately able to trace its provenance back to Caravaggio. It had sat in the dinging room of the Saint Ignatious Residence for around 60 years. As the Irish Times put it: "Extraordinarily, few people in the world were as well qualified as he to recognise, hanging in the Jesuits’ dining room, despite the dust and wear and tear of hundreds of years, a lost composition by one of the most celebrated painters in the history of western art...." The paper also noted that "he immediately suspected that he had seen the lost original of a painting known through many copies." Benedetti conducted his research in secrecy, fearing that dealers or wealthy museums would intervene if word got out that a major Caravaggio had been rediscovered. The cleaning and restoration process was extremely complex, due to the painting's condition.

Commissioned by the prominent Mattei banking family in Rome, Caravaggio's authorship was lost, and it was misidentified by the Matttei family as a painting by the Dutch artist Gerrit van Honthorst. When Benedetti saw the painting in 1990, it still had a plaque attributing it to Honthorst. A Scottish collector bought the painting. After failing to sell at an auction in Scotland, the picture was sold to a Dublin paediatrician named Dr Marie Lea-Wilson, who eventually donated it to the Jesuits. The Irish Times calls this discovery "one of the great art discoveries of the 20th century."

The rediscovered Caravaggio was first shown publicly in 1993 in the exhibition Caravaggio: the Master Revealed, which Benedetti curated. The Jesuit Community put the painting on indefinite loan to the National Gallery. Benedetti wrote an article on the painting in Burlington Magazine in 1993, and he coauthored another one in the same issue. rediscovery of the painting is the subject of a book by Jonathan Harr called The Lost Painting: The Quest for a Caravaggio Masterpiece (New York: Random House, 2005).

Benedetti also curated exhibitions at the National Gallery of Ireland, including Caravaggio and his Followers in 1992, and A Scholar's Eye: Paintings from the Sir Denis Mahon Collection. The Caravaggio and his Followers exhibition was staged in order to compare a painting from London to the Taking of Christ, and Denis Mahon had been brought in to Dublin to confirm Benedetti's attribution.

In 1994 Benedetti was awarded the rank of Commander of the Order of Merit of the Italian Republic for his services to art and culture.
