= Jonathan Harr =

American writer

Jonathan Harr is an American writer, best known for the nonfiction work A Civil Action.

== Early life and education ==
Jonathan Ensor Harr was born 13 September 1948, in Beloit, Wisconsin, the son of John Ensor Harr (1 August 1926–14 November 2004), a U.S. diplomat and author. Harr lived in France, Germany, Israel, Chicago, San Francisco, and Washington, D.C. He attended the College of William and Mary, but left in 1968 to serve as a VISTA volunteer in Appalachia. He later attended Marshall University.

== Career ==
Harr lives and works in Northampton, Massachusetts, where he has taught nonfiction writing at Smith College. In 2008 he was writer-in-residence at the University of Chicago.

He is a former staff writer at New England Monthly and has written for The New Yorker and The New York Times Magazine.

Harr spent approximately seven and a half years researching and writing A Civil Action, which was published in 1995, and subsequently nominated for a National Book Award, and awarded the National Book Critics Circle Award. John Travolta and Robert Duvall starred in the film of the same name, and Robert Redford was on the production team. Harr later wrote The Lost Painting: The Quest for a Caravaggio Masterpiece in 2005, which became a best seller. The New York Times named it one of the ten best books of 2005.

== Books ==
- Harr, Jonathan (1995). A Civil Action. New York: Random House. ISBN 9780712676625.
- Harr, Jonathan (2005). The Lost Painting: The Quest for a Caravaggio Masterpiece. New York: Random House. ISBN 0375759867.
