= William Screven =

- Born: c. 1629; Somerton, Somerset, England
- Died: 1713; Georgetown, Province of South Carolina

William Screven (c. 1629 – 1713) was a 17th-century Reformed Baptist church planter and preacher from England who founded the first Baptist church in the South.

== Early life ==
Coat of Arms of William Screven

William Augustine Screven was born in Somerton in Somerset, England, in 1629, and emigrated to New England in the 1640s. In the 1670s, Screven was baptised at the First Baptist Church in Boston by John Myles, pastor of the First Baptist Church in Swansea, who was also serving as pastor of the nearby Boston church during King Philip's War.

== Ministry ==
Screven was ordained in January 1682 by the First Baptist Church of Boston so that he might establish a church in Kittery, Province of Maine, which he did on September 25 of that year. In 1696, the new church moved to Charleston, Province of Carolina, at least partly because of disagreements between Screven and the New England Baptist authorities. According to family tradition, however, Screven and his band of ten followers were escorted to the edge of town by the local Puritans and told to leave and never return, on pain of hanging.

The relocated congregation became the First Baptist Church of Charleston, the oldest Baptist church in the South and one of the oldest in the United States. The Rev. Mr. Screven recommended that any future pastor be "orthodox in faith, and of blameless life, and does own the confession of faith put forth by our brethren in London in 1689" declaring the church to be firmly Calvinist (Reformed Baptist).

== Death ==
Screven died in 1713 and was buried on his personal property. The inscription on his grave reads as follows:

A pioneer Baptist Preacher of Sommerton, England, immigrated to Kittery, Maine, forced to leave that state for preaching the gospel, came south with a group of Baptists, organized the First Baptist Church in the South 1693, at Charleston, and served First Baptist there until 1706. Died in 1713 and buried in private yard at Georgetown, S.C. A servant of Christ, Pure in Morals, Sound in Doctrine, Abundant in Labors.

=== Legacy ===
The Screven Baptist Association, founded in 1950, is named for him. This group is an umbrella group for churches in Dorchester, Berkeley, and eastern Orangeburg Counties.

== See also ==
- Southern Baptist Convention
- Baptists in the United States
