= Marshall Symmes House =

Historic house in Massachusetts, United States

- U.S. National Register of Historic Places
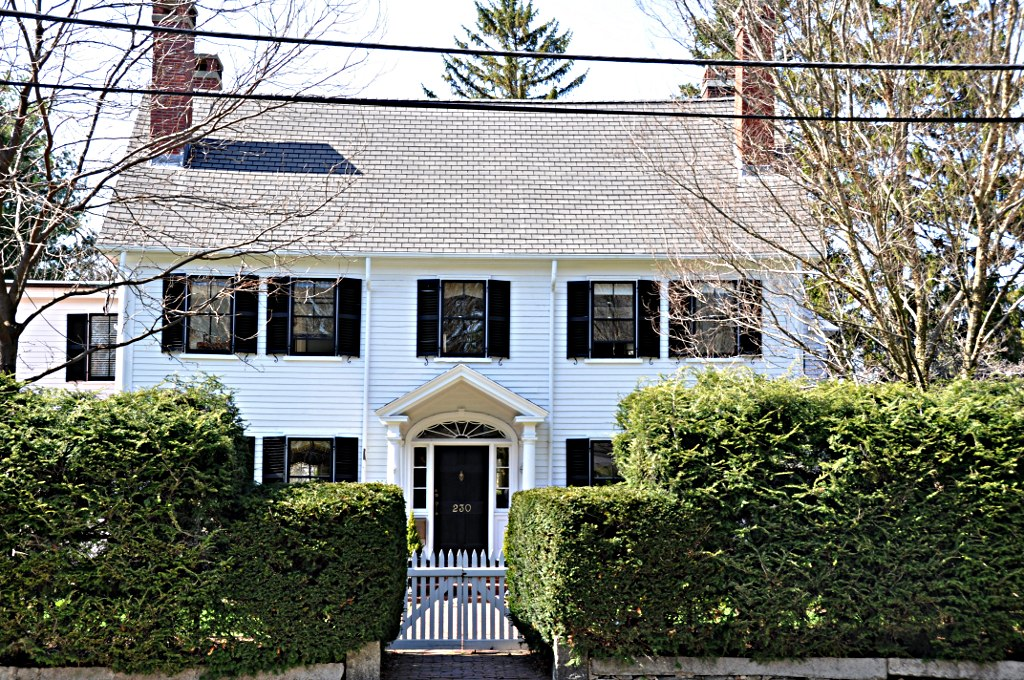

- Location within Massachusetts Location within the United States
- Location: 230 Main Street, Winchester, Massachusetts
- Coordinates: 42°26′33″N 71°8′12″W
- Area: less than one acre
- Built: 1817
- Architectural style: Federal
- MPS: Winchester MRA
- NRHP reference No.: 89000607
- Added to NRHP: July 5, 1989

The Marshall Symmes House is a historic house in Winchester, Massachusetts. Built c. 1817, it is a rare local example of Federal period brick-end house, and is further notable for its association with the Symmes family, who were among Winchester's earliest settlers. The house was listed on the National Register of Historic Places in 1989.

== Description and history ==
The Marshall Symmes House stands at the southwest corner of Symmes Street and Main Street (Massachusetts Route 38) in southern Winchester. It is a 2 1/2-story wood-frame structure, five bays wide, with a side-gable roof, clapboard siding on the front and rear, and brick side walls. The house corner boards are pilastered, and the central front door is framed by sidelight and fanlight windows. It is sheltered by a gabled portico supported by round columns.

Rev. Zechariah Symmes, pastor of the Charlestown church, was granted land in this area that was settled by his sons about 1650. Marshall Symmes, a grandson who was a blacksmith with a shop that stood near Bacon and Main Streets, built this house about 1817, around the time of his marriage to Relief Stowell. It stands not far from the house of his brother John. Both Marshall and Symmes Streets are named for Marshall Symmes. At the time of its listing on the National Register in 1989, it remained in the hands of Symmes descendants.

== See also ==
- Marshall Symmes Tenant House
- Deacon John Symmes House
- National Register of Historic Places listings in Winchester, Massachusetts
