= Samuel Luther =

Samuel Luther (1636 – 20 December 1716) was a prominent early figure in the Massachusetts Colony. He served as the minister of the First Baptist Church of Swansea from 1685 until his death. He also served as a militia captain. Through his wife Mary Abell, daughter of Robert Abell, his descendants have richly documented English ancestry, including extensive ties to royalty and nobility.

Samuel Luther perhaps survived a raid by a group of Lenape Indians at age nine while accompanying his father on a trading voyage to Delaware Bay, and was held captive for a period. His father, Captain John Luther, was killed in the raid. Some chroniclers question the likelihood of a nine-year-old boy participating in such a risky trading endeavor, proposing that an older brother may have been the captive Luther. However, no older son of Captain Luther is acknowledged by genealogical authorities. In any event, the general circumstances of the incident are corroborated by several primary sources.

His fourth great-grandparents were Hans Luther and Margaretha Lindemann.
