= Thomas Gould =

Thomas Gould may refer to:

- Thomas Gould (Baptist preacher) (1619–1675), first pastor of the First Baptist Church of Boston in Boston, Massachusetts, USA
- Thomas Gould (cricketer) (1863–1948), English cricketer
- Thomas Gould (violinist) (born 1983), English violinist
- Thomas Ridgeway Gould (1818–1881), American sculptor
- Thomas William Gould (1914–2001), English recipient of the Victoria Cross
- Thomas Gould (politician), Irish Sinn Féin politician
