= Deacon John Symmes House =

Historic house in Massachusetts, United States

- U.S. National Register of Historic Places
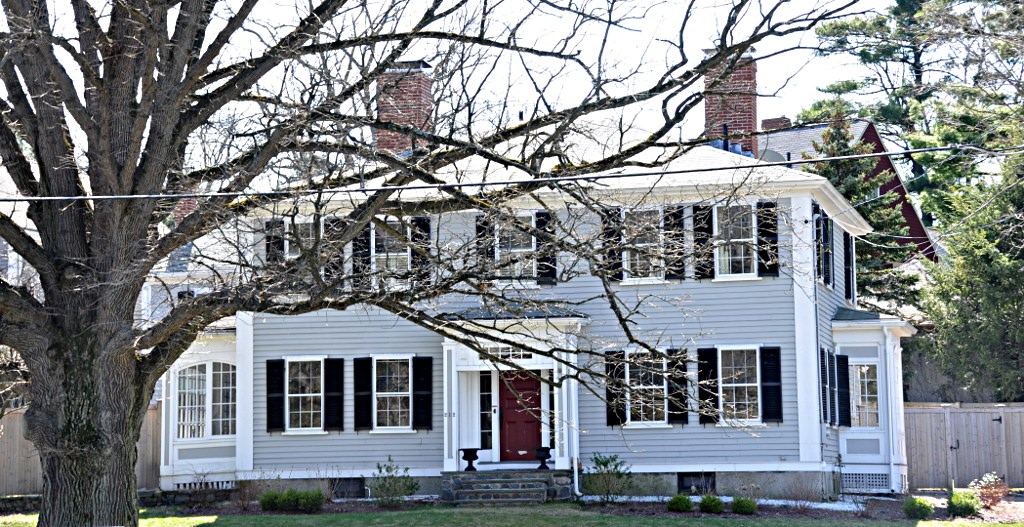

- Location within Massachusetts Location within the United States
- Location: 212 Main Street, Winchester, Massachusetts
- Coordinates: 42°26′29″N 71°8′11″W
- Area: less than one acre
- Built: 1807
- Architectural style: Federal
- MPS: Winchester MRA
- NRHP reference No.: 89000606
- Added to NRHP: July 5, 1989

The Deacon John Symmes House is a historic house in Winchester, Massachusetts. Built about 1807, it is a fine local example of Federal period architecture, and is also significant for its association with the Symmes family, who were among Winchester's earliest settlers. The house was listed on the National Register of Historic Places in 1989.

== Description and history ==
The Deacon Symmes House is located at the southern junction of Grove and Main Streets, at a five-way interchange involving those two streets, Bacon Street, and Everell Road. This area is known as Symmes Corner for its association with that family, which began settling the area about 1650. This house is a two-story wood-frame structure, five bays wide, with a hip roof, twin rear wall chimneys, and clapboard siding. The entrance is centered and flanked by sidelight windows, with a sheltering shallow hip-roof portico.

Rev. Zechariah Symmes, pastor of the Charlestown church, was granted land in this area that was settled by his sons about 1650. One son Deacon John Symmes, a blacksmith, built this house about 1807, making it the oldest surviving house of the Symmes family. The house was originally fitted with a balustrade around the roof, which was removed at an unknown date; the front portico is also a later addition. Also standing nearby are the Marshall Symmes House, built c. 1817 by John Symmes' brother, and the Marshall Symmes Tenant House.

== See also ==
- Marshall Symmes House
- National Register of Historic Places listings in Winchester, Massachusetts
