= Thomas Carter (minister) =

17th-century Puritan minister of the Massachusetts Bay Colony

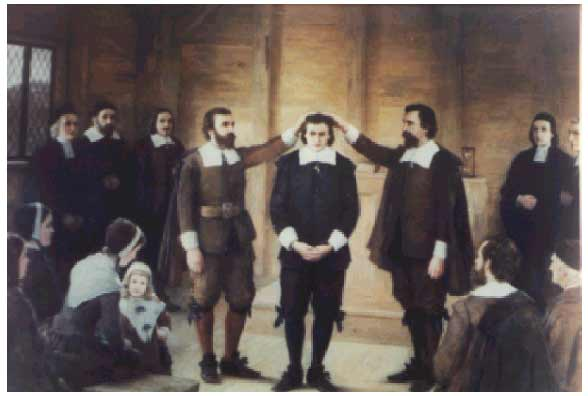
- 19th-century painting depicting Carter's ordination as minister of Woburn
- Born: 1608; Hinderclay, Suffolk, England
- Died: September 5, 1684 (aged 75–76); Woburn, Massachusetts Bay Colony
- Education: St John's College, Cambridge
- Occupation: Clergyman
- Known for: Signer of the Dedham Covenant
- Spouse: Mary Parkhurst
- Children: 8

Thomas Carter (1608 – 5 September 1684) was an American colonist and Puritan minister. Educated at Cambridge, he left England and emigrated to the American colonies during the Puritan Great Migration. Carter was ordained as a Puritan minister in 1642, becoming the first person in the American colonies to receive a Christian ordination. He served as a church elder and minister in Dedham, Watertown, and Woburn. A prominent religious figure in the Massachusetts Bay Colony, Carter was one signers of the Dedham Covenant and one of the founders of Woburn.

== Early life and family ==
Carter was born in Hinderclay, Suffolk, England, and baptized there on 3 July 1608. His father, James Carter, was a yeoman. He had an older brother, James, baptized 14 June 1603, and an older sister, Mary, baptized 25 March 1605 or 1606. He studied at St John's College, Cambridge, receiving his B.A. in 1630 and his M.A. in 1633. Carter was a student at Cambridge at the same time as John Harvard. Like Harvard and many other Puritans, Carter emigrated to New England as part of the Great Migration.

== Life in the colonies ==
Coat of Arms of Thomas Carter

Carter was recognized as a freeman of Dedham, Massachusetts, in 1637. He was active in the church, both at Dedham, and at Watertown, Massachusetts, where he served as an elder.

Carter, who signed the Dedham Covenant, was considered for the post of the initial minister of the First Church and Parish in Dedham. Carter preached in Woburn for the first time on December 4, 1641, which was the second service of public worship ever held in the new town. Having demonstrated spiritual gifts during his time as an elder, on November 22, 1642, Carter was ordained at Woburn, Massachusetts, becoming the first pastor of the Woburn congregation and the first religious ordination in the Americas.

In 1638, Carter married Mary Parkhurst (1614–1687), daughter of George Parkhurst and Phoebe Leete, whose cousin William Leete became Governor of the Colony of Connecticut. Together, they had eight children: Samuel, Judith, Theopilus, Mary, Abigail, Deborah, Timothy, and Thomas.

== Legacy ==
A painting by Albert Thompson depicting the occasion of his ordination is currently displayed at the Woburn Public Library. His ordination, as the painting suggests, included all of the major ministers of Massachusetts, including John Cotton, Richard Mather, John Eliot, Edward Johnson, John Wilson, with Increase Nowell sitting in the front row.
