= Community Weeklies =

American newspaper company

Community Weeklies Inc.
- Industry: Newspapers
- Founded: October 24, 1991
- Defunct: January 11, 1996
- Fate: Bought, then dissolved
- Successor: Community Newspaper Company
- Headquarters: 204 West Cummings Park, Woburn, Massachusetts 01801; United States
- Key people: William S. Cummings, founder
- Products: Three weekly newspapers
- Parent: Cummings Properties, 1991-1994; Fidelity Investments, 1994-1996

Community Weeklies Inc., based in Woburn, Massachusetts, United States, founded three weekly newspapers in the suburbs north of Boston before being bought by Fidelity Investments in 1994 and dissolved into Community Newspaper Company two years later.

The company was founded by developer William S. Cummings of Winchester, the largest property owner in Woburn, to compete with the Daily Times Chronicle and a supposedly "anti-business" local political scene.

== History ==
After years of complaining about the quality of the local daily and criticizing local politics—including several guest columns in the Daily Times—Cummings in 1991 envisioned starting a monthly newspaper to offer "an alternative voice" in Woburn. He found an advertising base willing to support a weekly, however, so in October 1991 he debuted his free weekly, explaining:

The Advocate is not going to compete with the Daily Times Chronicle. We're not going to tell you about auto accidents at Fourth and Main but, rather, about trends and issues in the city. I'll be a hands-on publisher, but not an ever-present one.

Nevertheless, Cummings' status as Woburn's largest landowner, and landlord at its largest office parks, opened the paper to the impression that its editorials and business coverage were simply mouthpieces for Cummings Properties, a charge Cummings denied.

The Woburn paper's coverage of Stoneham and Winchester—neighboring towns to Woburn—proved so successful that Cummings established new weeklies for those towns in 1994. Upon the debut of the Winchester Town Crier, Cummings detailed his formula: Emphasis on features and sports, with less coverage of local government than his competitors.

Later that year, however, Cummings decided to sell his three-paper chain to Fidelity Investments, parent of Community Newspaper Company, the largest publisher of weeklies in Massachusetts.

Community Weeklies was dissolved in early 1996, when CNC realigned its operating units by geography, assigning the papers to its new Northwest Unit.

== Properties ==
At the time of its sale to CNC, Community Weeklies consisted of the following weeklies:

- Stoneham Sun of Stoneham (founded 1994)
- Winchester Town Crier of Winchester (founded 1994)
- Woburn Advocate of Woburn (founded 1991)

The Winchester paper was folded into CNC's The Winchester Star, a decades-old weekly. The Advocate is in the Northwest Unit; the Stoneham paper, originally grouped in Northwest, is now part of CNC's North Unit.
