= First Baptist Church (Boston) =

Historic church in Massachusetts, United States

- U.S. National Register of Historic Places
- U.S. Historic district – Contributing property
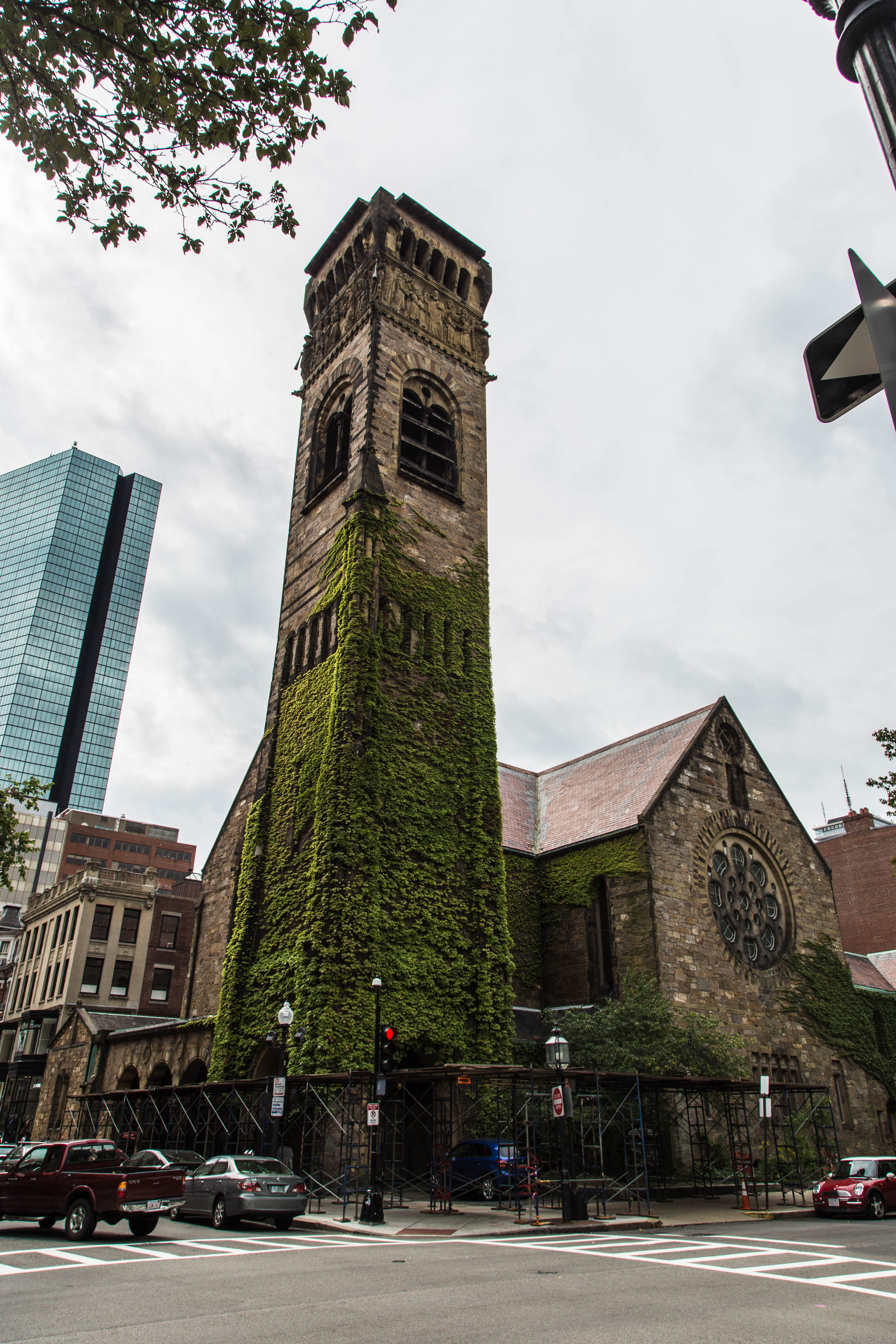
- Location: Boston, Massachusetts
- Coordinates: 42°21′7″N 71°4′34″W
- Built: 1872
- Architect: Henry Hobson Richardson; Frédéric Auguste Bartholdi
- Architectural style: Richardsonian Romanesque
- Part of: Back Bay Historic District (ID73001948)
- NRHP reference No.: 72000146

Significant dates
- Added to NRHP: February 23, 1972
- Designated CP: August 14, 1973

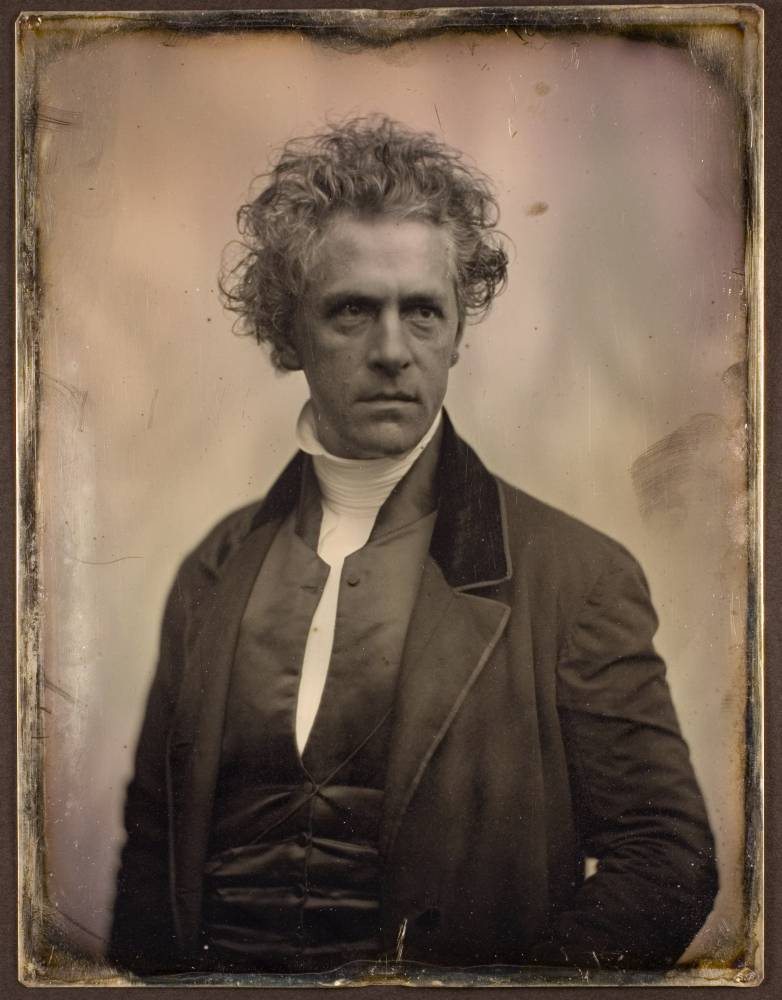
Southworth & Hawes: Rollin Heber Neale (ca. 1850)

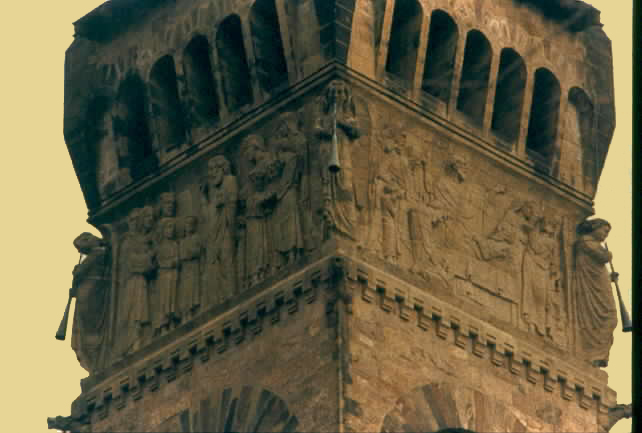
Brattle Square Church, Boston, with sculpture by Frédéric Auguste Bartholdi (who did the Statue of Liberty)

The First Baptist Church (or "Brattle Square Church") is a historic American Baptist Churches USA congregation, established in 1665. It is one of the oldest Baptist churches in the United States. It first met secretly in members homes, and the doors of the first church were nailed shut by a decree from the Puritans in March 1680. The congregation was forced to move to Noddle's Island. The congregation was forced to be disguised as a tavern and members traveled by water to worship. Rev. Dr. Stillman led the congregation in the North End for over 40 years, from 1764 to 1807. The congregation moved to Beacon Hill in 1854, where it was the tallest steeple in the city. After a slow demise under Rev. Dr. Rollin Heber Neale, the congregation briefly joined with the Shawmut Ave. Church, and the Warren Avenue Tabernacle, and merged and bought the current church building in 1881, for $100,000.00. Since 1882 it has been located at the corner of Commonwealth Avenue and Clarendon Street in the Back Bay. The interior is currently a pending Boston Landmark through the Boston Landmarks Commission.

== History ==
=== 1665–1837 ===
The congregation was founded in 1665 despite a Massachusetts law prohibiting opposition to infant baptism. Many of the early members of the church were persecuted and imprisoned by the state church for heresy, including the first pastor, Thomas Gould. Shortly before the founding of the church, the first Harvard College president, Henry Dunster, was forced to resign his position for refusing to baptize his infant. Dunster had been theologically influenced by Dr. John Clarke and other Rhode Island Baptists persecuted in Massachusetts. During King Philip's War, John Myles pastored the congregation while on hiatus from the First Baptist Church in Swansea, which was the first church in the state. "In 1679, the Boston Baptists built a meetinghouse in the North End of Boston, at the corner of Salem and Stillman Streets. ...In the early 1700s, the small building was replaced by a larger wooden one on the same site. Here the congregation flourished, for 43 years (1764–1807) under the leadership of Samuel Stillman." Samuel Stillman kept the doors open for services while the British invaded Boston and is said to have preached against them every single service.

In 1682, under the watch of William Screven, the congregation organised a spinoff mission in present-day Kittery, Maine; as a result of issues with Congregationalism in the 1690s, the congregation moved to Charleston, South Carolina and is the modern day First Baptist Church meeting in Charleston, South Carolina.

=== 1837–1882 ===
In 1837 the First Baptist congregation moved into a new brick church building (fourth meeting house) on the corner of Hanover Street and Union Street. Preachers included Rollin Heber Neale. The congregation remained at this location until 1882.

=== 1882–present ===
The current church building (fifth meeting house) was designed by the notable architect Henry Hobson Richardson and built in 1869–71. It opened in 1872 to serve the Unitarian congregation of the Brattle Street Church, also known as the Church in Brattle Square, which had been demolished in 1872. The Unitarian congregation dissolved soon after moving to this building. The First Baptist congregation bought the building in 1881 for a sum of $100,000.00. The historic and prominent tower with distinctive friezes carved "in-situ" by Frédéric Auguste Bartholdi (sculptor of the Statue of Liberty) representing four sacraments, with faces of famous Bostonians (including Longfellow and Hawthorne), Abraham Lincoln, and Bartholdi's friends of that era, (including Garibaldi). This building was Richardson's first church in Boston before he designed his masterpiece, Trinity Church. This church was added to the National Register of Historic Places in 1972. The congregation is affiliated with the American Baptist Churches USA.

== See also ==
- National Register of Historic Places listings in northern Boston, Massachusetts
