= Marshall Symmes Tenant House =

Historic house in Massachusetts, United States

- U.S. National Register of Historic Places
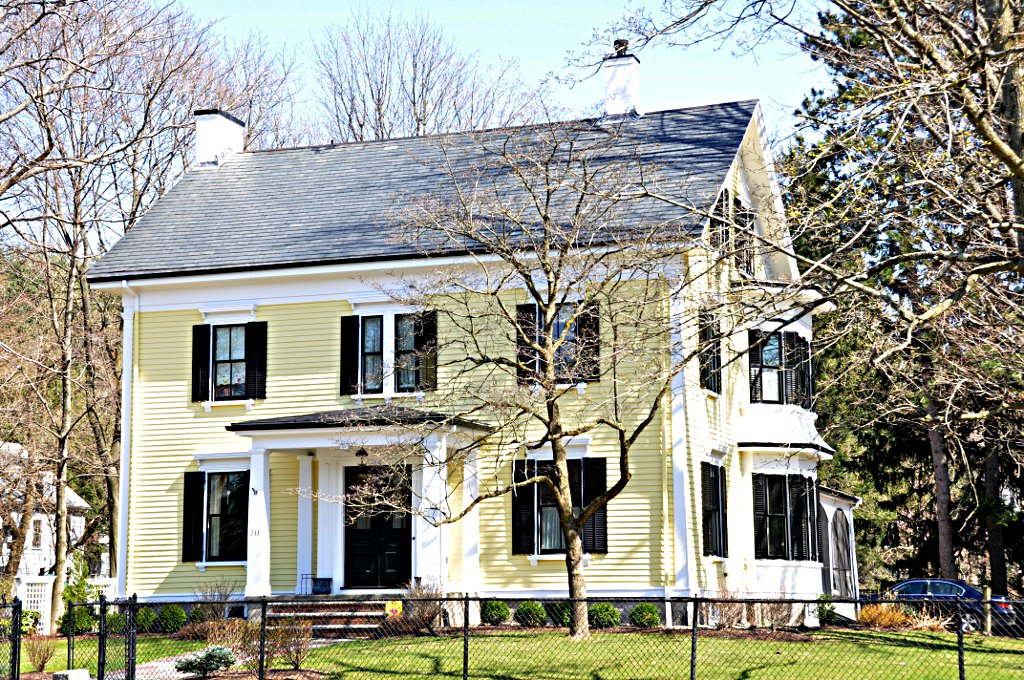

- Location within Massachusetts Location within the United States
- Location: 233 Main Street, Winchester, Massachusetts
- Coordinates: 42°26′35″N 71°8′11″W
- Area: less than one acre
- Built: 1875
- Architectural style: Italianate
- MPS: Winchester MRA
- NRHP reference No.: 89000637
- Added to NRHP: July 5, 1989

The Marshall Symmes Tenant House is a historic house in Winchester, Massachusetts, USA. Built in the 1870s as a rental property on land owned by Marshall Symmes (1789-1889), this Italianate house is notable for its association with the Symmes family, who were among Winchester's first settlers. The house was listed on the National Register of Historic Places in 1989.

== Description and history ==
The Marshall Symmes Tenant House is located on the east side of Main Street (Massachusetts Route 38), across the street from the Marshall Symmes House. It is a 2 1/2-story wood-frame structure, three bays wide, with a side-gable roof and clapboard siding. The entrance is centered on the west-facing front facade, sheltered by a hip roof supported by tapered square columns. A two-story polygonal bay projects from the south side, and a two-story ell in the rear joins the house to a carriage barn.

Rev. Zachariah Symmes, pastor of the Charlestown church, was granted land in this area that was settled by his sons about 1650. Marshall Symmes, a grandson who was a blacksmith with a shop that stood near Bacon and Main Streets, built this house in the 1870s (based on stylistic analysis), apparently as a rental property. It is one of three houses in the area associated with the Symmes family, whose names (including those of relations) are found on nearby Symmes Street, Stowell Street, and Marshall Street.

== See also ==
- Deacon John Symmes House
- National Register of Historic Places listings in Winchester, Massachusetts
