= Ilston Book =

Earliest record of a Baptist church in Wales

The Ilston Book is the earliest record of a Baptist church in Wales. It is named after the location of a Baptist meeting place near the ruins of the old Trinity well, the site of a pre-Reformation chapel, at Ilston Beck in Gower near Swansea.

== History ==
The "Cromwellian" church at Ilston Beck near Swansea.was founded in 1649 during the English Civil War under the Calvinistic leadership of John Myles (a.k.a. John Miles) (1621–1683). It was thus the earliest Welsh Baptist church in the Particular Baptist tradition.

In 1663 Myles took the Ilston Book with him when he and the whole congregation emigrated to North America, where they settled in a town they named Swansea, Massachusetts, and they founded the First Baptist Church in Swansea.

== Brown University ==
The Ilston Book is held in the Library of Brown University at Providence, Rhode Island, but is not open to public view.

The full list of 261 members up to 1660 is recorded, and shows that they traveled from a wide geographical area in South Wales.
