= First Baptist Church (Charleston, South Carolina) =

Historic Baptist church in Charleston, South Carolina, United States

Coordinates: 32°46′27″N 79°55′46″W

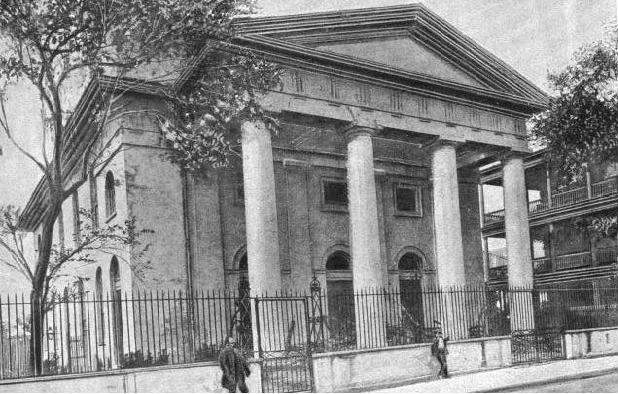
The First Baptist Church of Charleston, SC, sanctuary was designed by Robert Mills; completed in 1822.

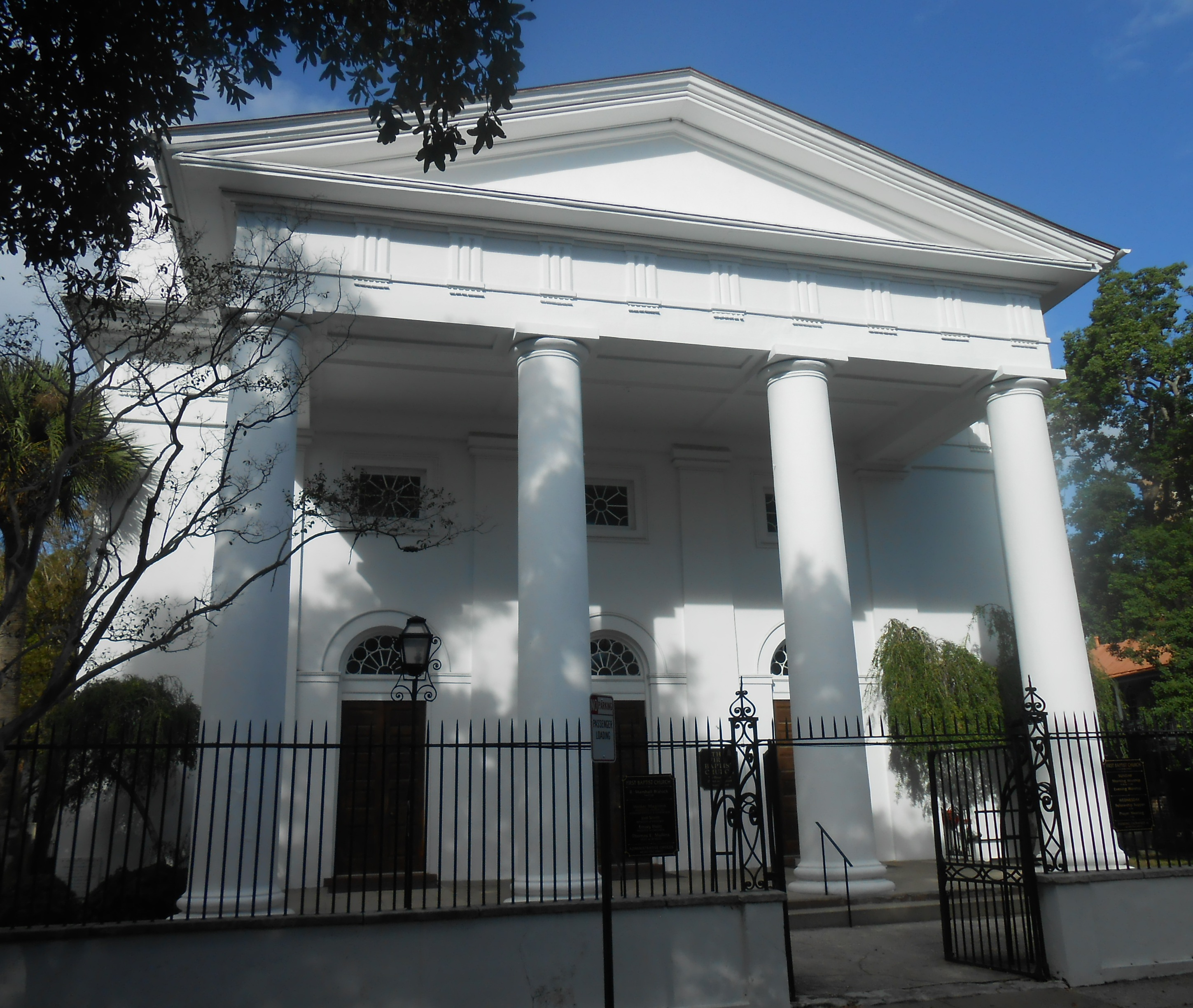
The First Baptist Church of Charleston, SC, sanctuary was designed by Robert Mills; completed in 1822.

First Baptist Church is a Baptist church in Charleston, South Carolina. It is affiliated with the Southern Baptist Convention. The congregation was founded in 1682 under the leadership of William Screven. It is one of the oldest Baptist congregations in the American South. The church congregation was originally organized in Kittery, Maine (then part of Massachusetts) under the guidance of the First Baptist Church of Boston. In 1696 twenty-six congregants followed Pastor Screven and moved to Charleston after being pressured by the New England Congregationalist authorities. The relocated congregation became the First Baptist Church of Charleston. Pastor Screven recommended that any future pastor be "orthodox in faith, and of blameless life, and does own the confession of faith put forth by our brethren in London in 1689" declaring the church to be firmly Calvinist (Reformed Baptist). First Baptist Church is currently affiliated with the Southern Baptist denomination. The current Greek Revival sanctuary was designed by Robert Mills and built in 1820.

On June 26, 2019, the church announced the building will be temporarily closed after the July 7, 2019 services as a result of area reconstruction; the education building demolition began in June 2019, and after full demolition began in July 2019, it was deemed unsafe to be around the church. The church moved to nearby James Island in their school auditorium until construction was complete. The church was open for limited use such as their Christmas services, but during that time met on James Island.

On Easter Sunday, April 17, 2022, the church returned to the newly renovated downtown campus and continues to meet in its historic sanctuary.

== Sources ==
- Tupper, Henry Allen (1889). Two centuries of the First Baptist Church of South Carolina, 1683-1883. R. H. Woodward.
