= Edward Johnson (colonial officer) =

Founder of Woburn, Massachusetts (1598–1672)

Coat of Arms of Edward Johnson

Captain Edward Johnson (1598–1672) was a leading figure in colonial Massachusetts, and is one of the founders of Woburn, Massachusetts.

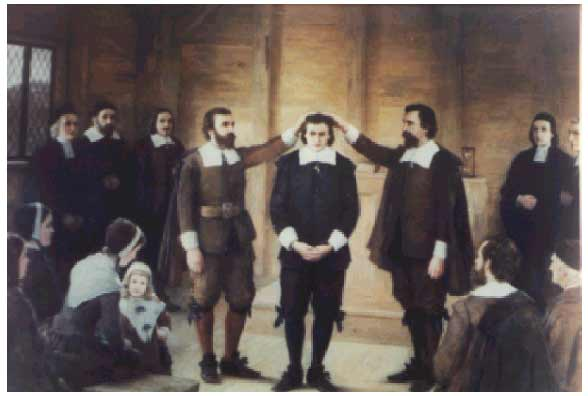
19th-century painting by Albert Thompson, on display at the Woburn Public Library, depicting Thomas Carter's ordination as minister of Woburn, Massachusetts on November 22, 1642. Capt. Edward Johnson is standing to Carter's right in the painting.

Johnson probably came to America in the Winthrop Fleet in 1630. He returned to England in 1636 or 1637 to bring his wife and children to America. He was considered the "Father of Woburn", and served as its first town clerk (from 1640 until his death). He was selected as Deputy from Woburn to the Massachusetts General Court (the colonial legislature) almost every year from 1646 on.

Johnson was the first military officer commissioned in Woburn, and was one of the founders of the Ancient and Honorable Artillery Company of Massachusetts. He served as an ensign in Cooke's Company in the Pequot War, served as lieutenant for the Middlesex County Troop in 1643, and was made captain in 1644. He served as Surveyor General of the military stores of the colony in 1659.

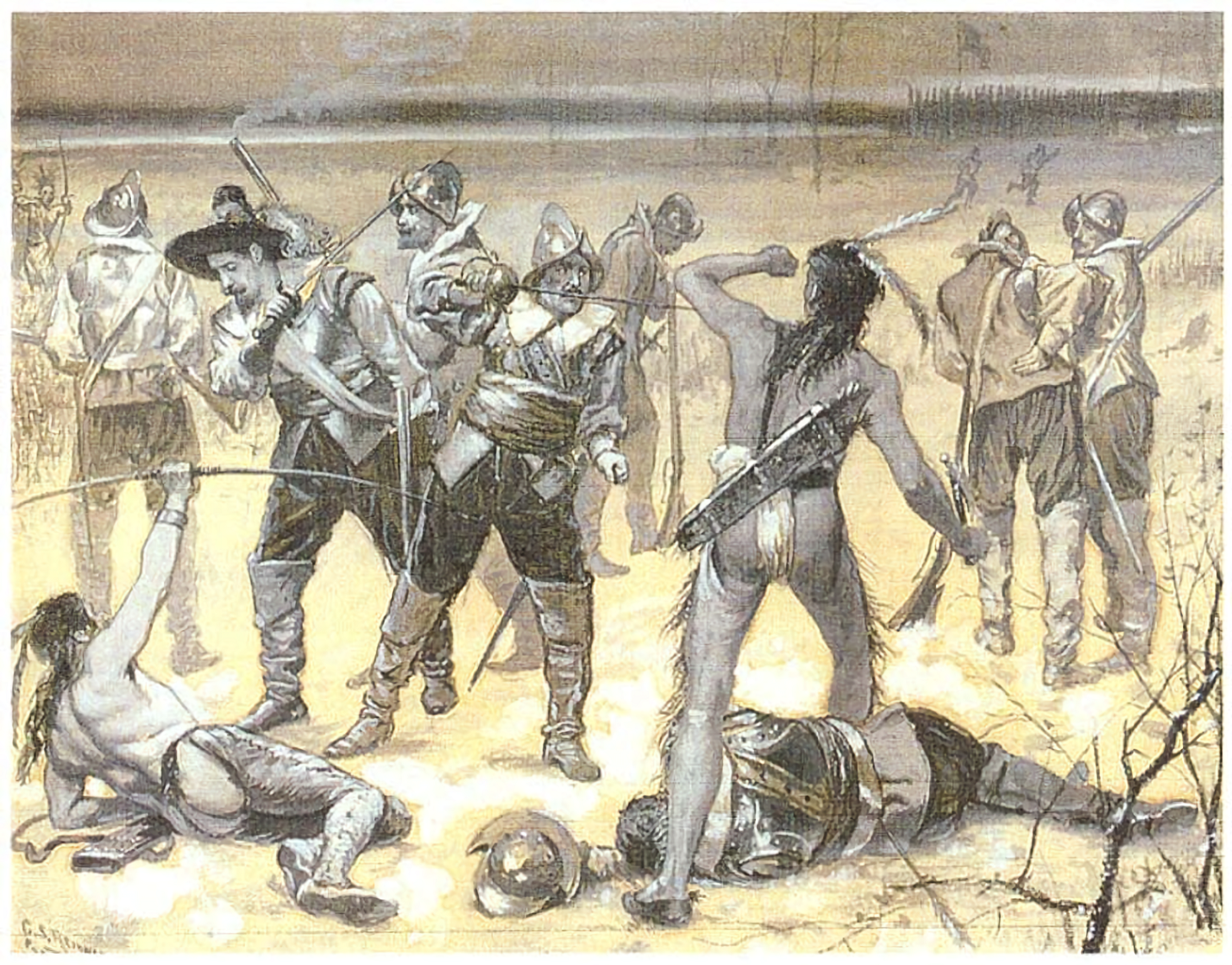
The Pequot War from a Charles Stanley Reinhart drawing circa 1890

Johnson is regarded as the author of the first printed history of New England, The Wonder-Working Providence of Sions Savior in New England, which was published in England in 1654.

Johnson was selected by the General Court to make the first map of Massachusetts. He established the boundary between Massachusetts and New Hampshire, and also laid out the boundaries of Woburn and other towns.
