= First Church of Woburn =

Historic church in Massachusetts, United States

- First Congregational Church of Woburn
- U.S. National Register of Historic Places
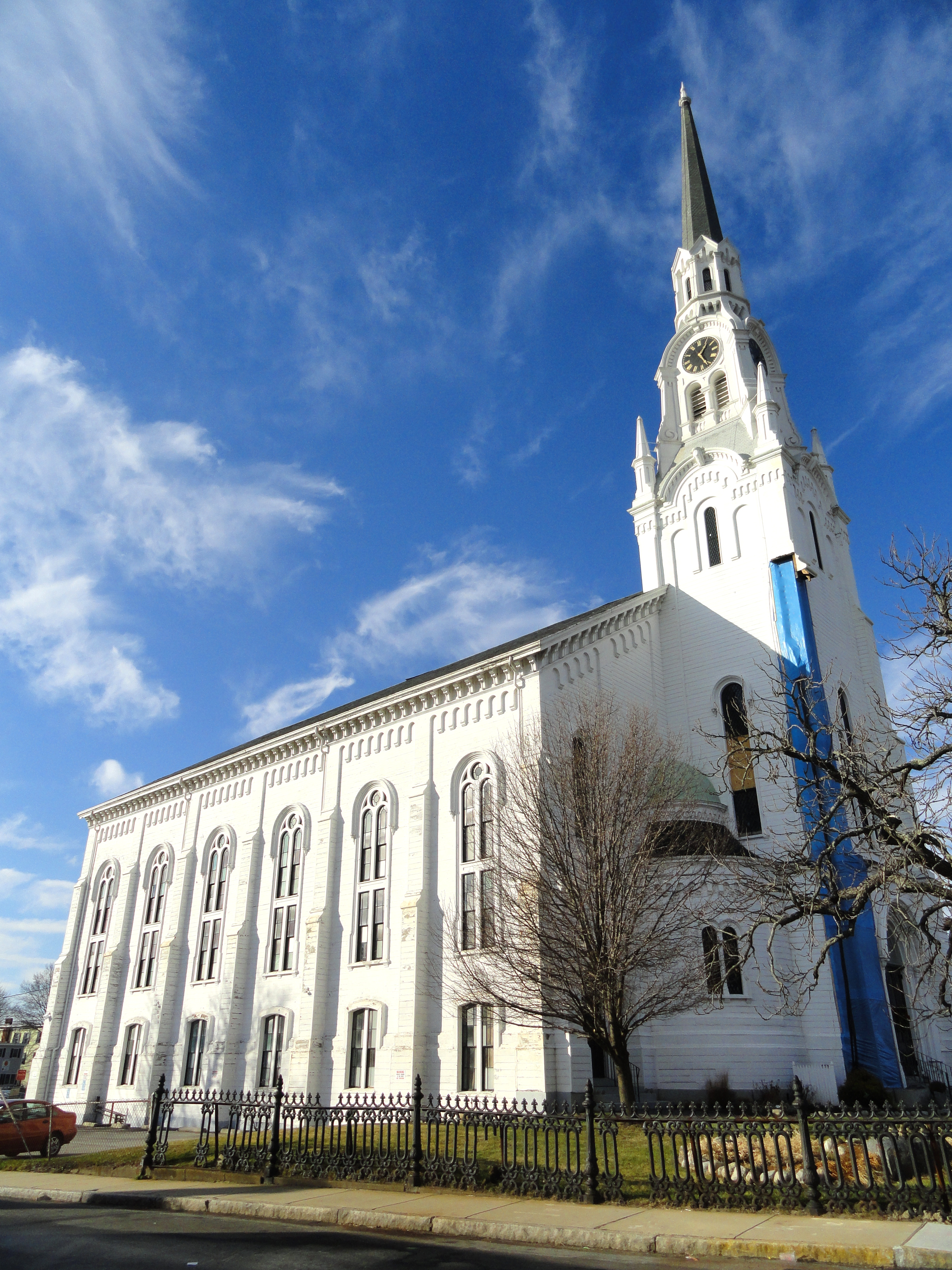

- Location within Massachusetts Location within the United States
- Location: Woburn, Massachusetts
- Coordinates: 42°28′43″N 71°9′9″W
- Built: 1860
- Built by: D. Tilson & Son
- Architect: John Stevens
- Architectural style: Italianate, Romanesque
- NRHP reference No.: 91001898
- Added to NRHP: January 6, 1992

The First Church of Woburn, formerly the First Congregational Church in Woburn, is a historic nondenominational Christian church at 322 Main Street in Woburn, Massachusetts. The congregation, established in 1642, is one of the oldest in the United States, and its church building (the sixth for the congregation) is a local landmark. The Italianate-style church was built in 1860, and its 196-foot (60 m) steeple is believed to be the tallest wooden steeple in North America. The church is home to a historic E. & G. G. Hook pipe organ, dating to the time of the church's construction.

The church building has been listed on the National Register of Historic Places since 1992. The congregation was originally Puritan, as were all acknowledged churches in Massachusetts at the time, and was later affiliated with the United Church of Christ in the early 20th century until resigning the denomination in the late 1980s. It is now declared nondenominational in the evangelical tradition but did not drop the Congregational designation from its name until 2018.

== See also ==
- National Register of Historic Places listings in Middlesex County, Massachusetts
