= Woburn, Massachusetts =

- City
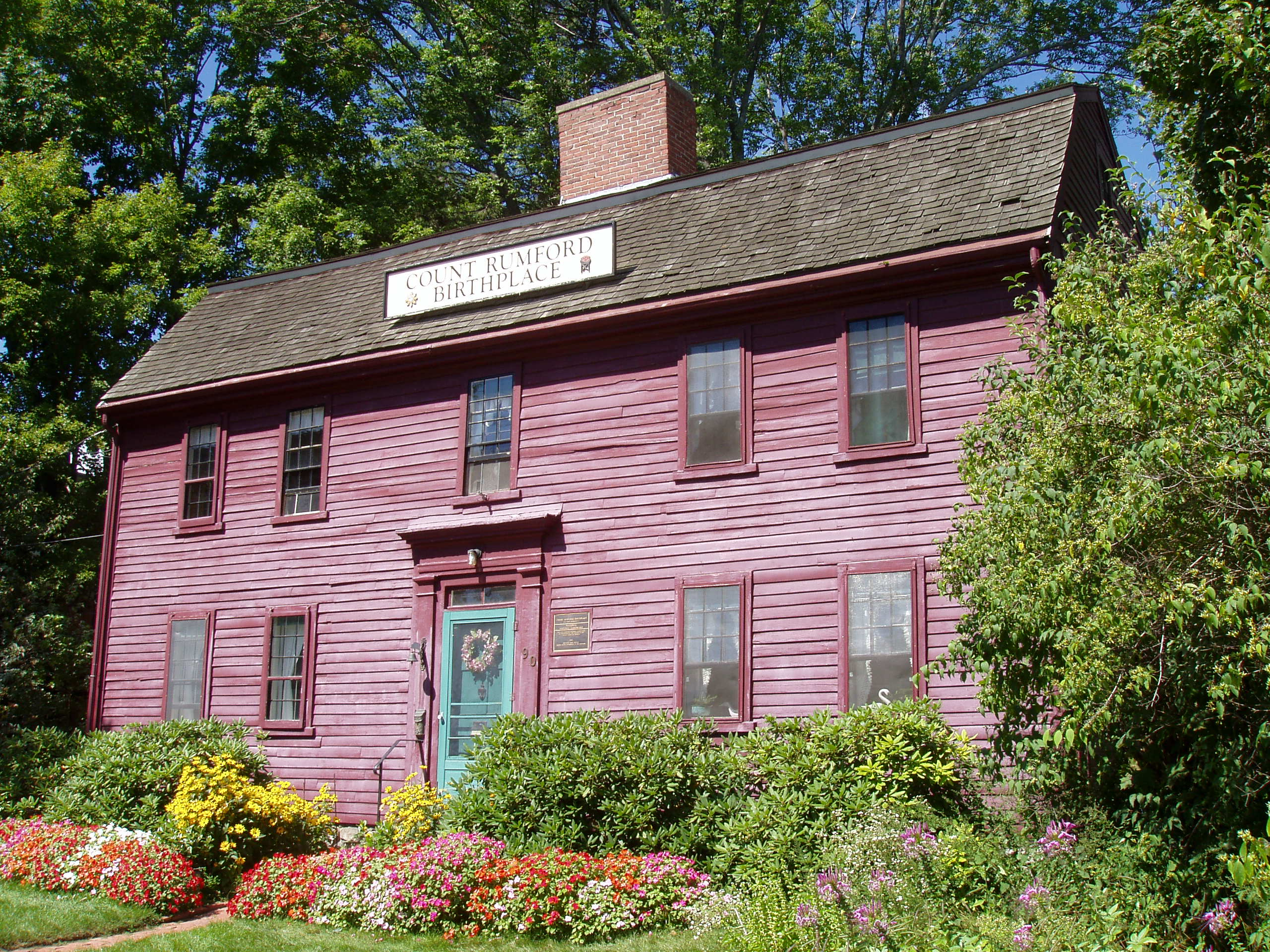
- Benjamin Thompson House, Woburn, Massachusetts

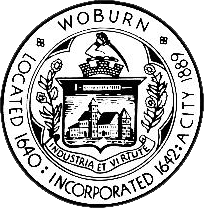
- Seal
- Motto: Industria et Virtute (Latin) "Industry and Virtue"
- Location in Middlesex County, Massachusetts

- Location in the United States Woburn (Massachusetts)
- Coordinates: 42°28′45″N 71°09′10″W
- Country: United States
- State: Massachusetts
- County: Middlesex
- Region: New England
- Settled: 1640
- Incorporated (town): 1642
- Incorporated (city): 1889
- Named for: Woburn, Bedfordshire

Government
  - Type: Mayor-council city
  - City Mayor: Michael Concannon
  - Ward aldermen: JoAnn Campbell (1); William J. Pappalardo (2); Jeffrey P. Dillon (3); Joseph E. Demers (4); Darlene Mercer-Bruen (5); Jou Dimambro (6); Charles Viola (7)
  - At-large aldermen: Robert F. Toro Jr. Robert J. Ferullo Jr.

Area
  - Total: 12.94 sq mi (33.52 km^{2})
  - Land: 12.65 sq mi (32.76 km^{2})
  - Water: 0.29 sq mi (0.76 km^{2})
- Elevation: 98 ft (30 m)

Population (2020)
  - Total: 40,876
  - Density: 3,231.4/sq mi (1,247.64/km^{2})
- Time zone: UTC−5 (Eastern)
  - Summer (DST): UTC−4 (Eastern)
- ZIP Codes: 01801, 01888
- Area code: 339/781
- FIPS code: 25-81035
- GNIS feature ID: 0612270
- Website: www.woburnma.gov

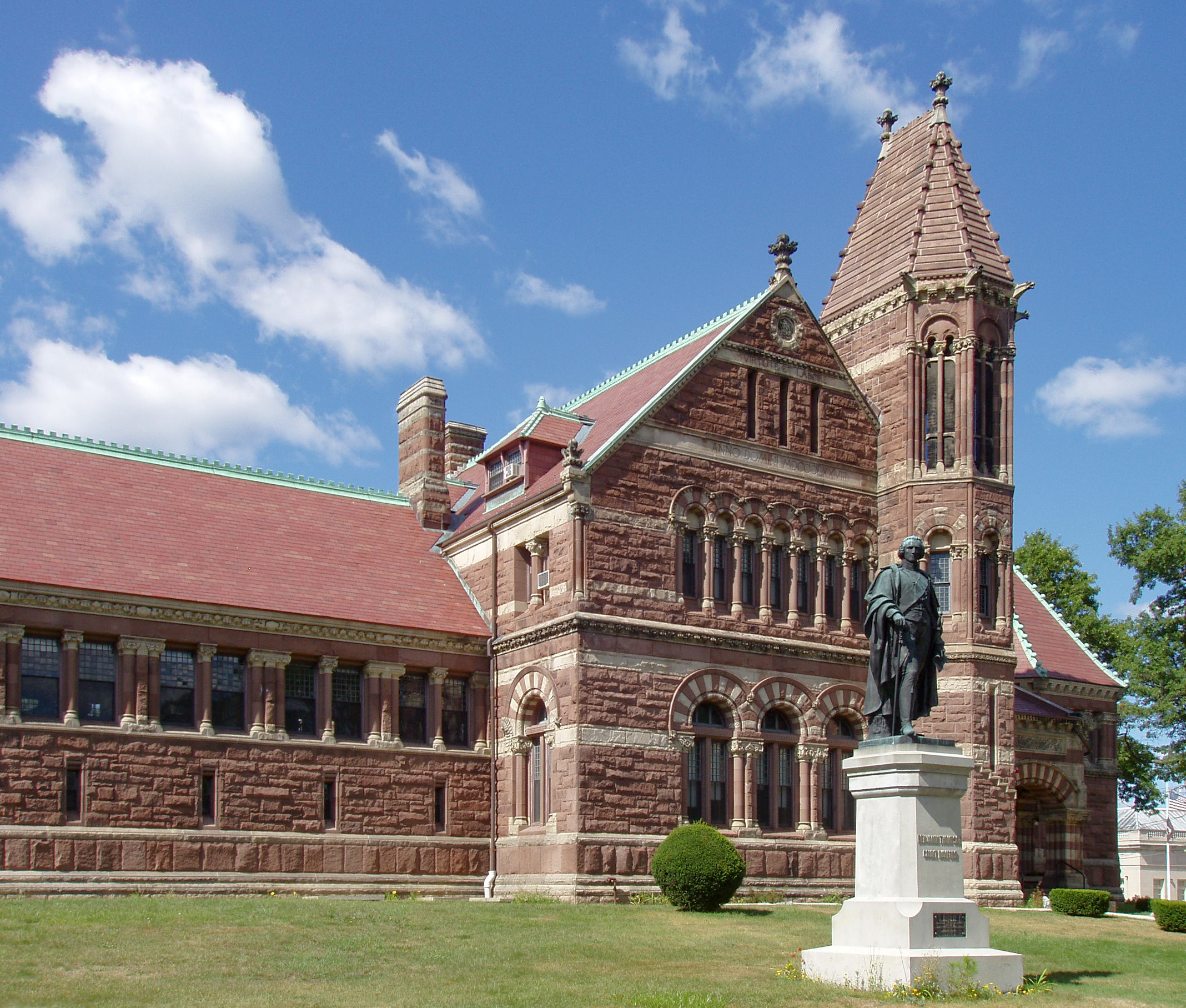
Statue of Benjamin Thompson (Count Rumford) outside the library of his hometown, Woburn, Massachusetts (designed by Henry Hobson Richardson)

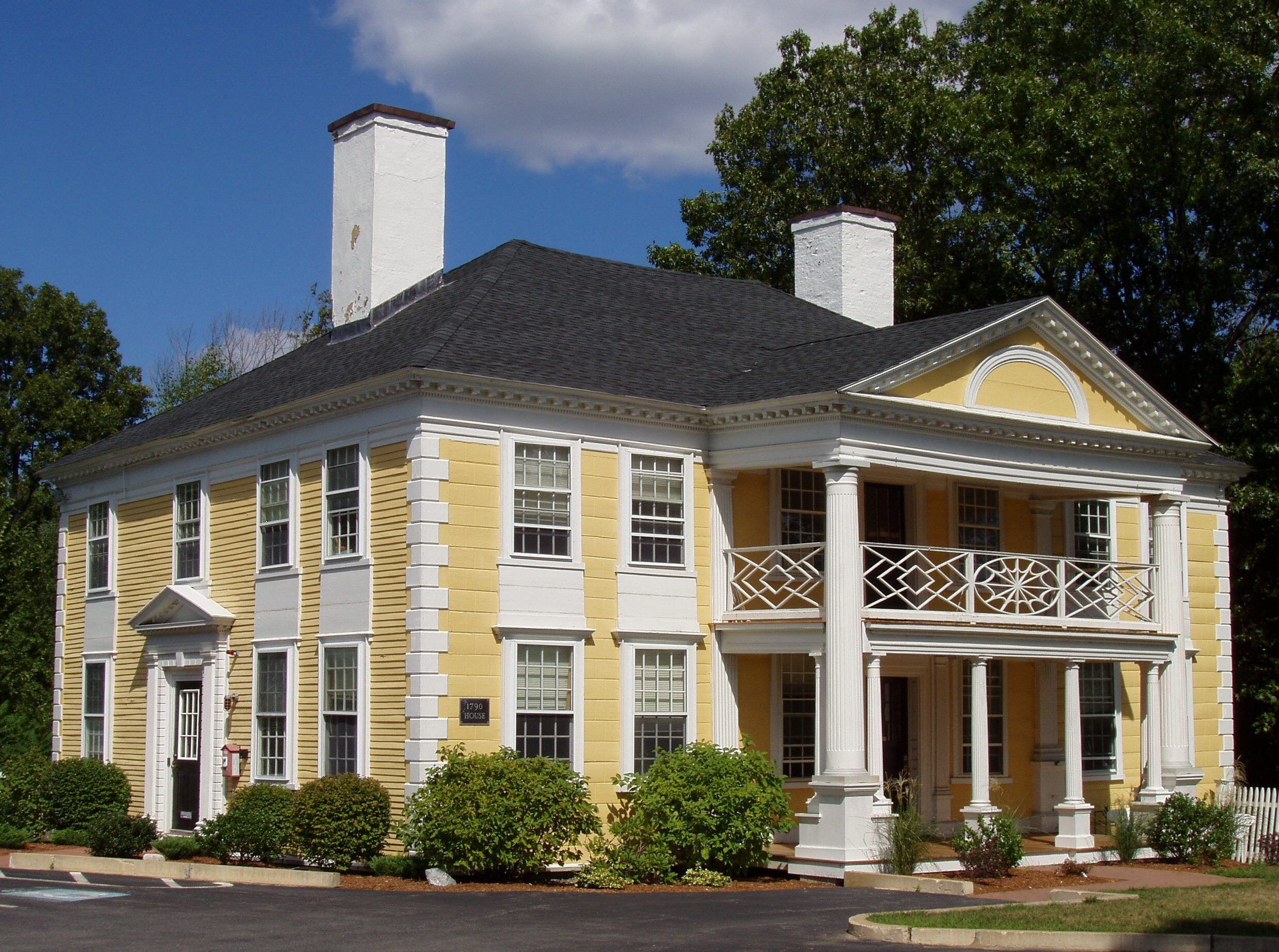
The 1790 House

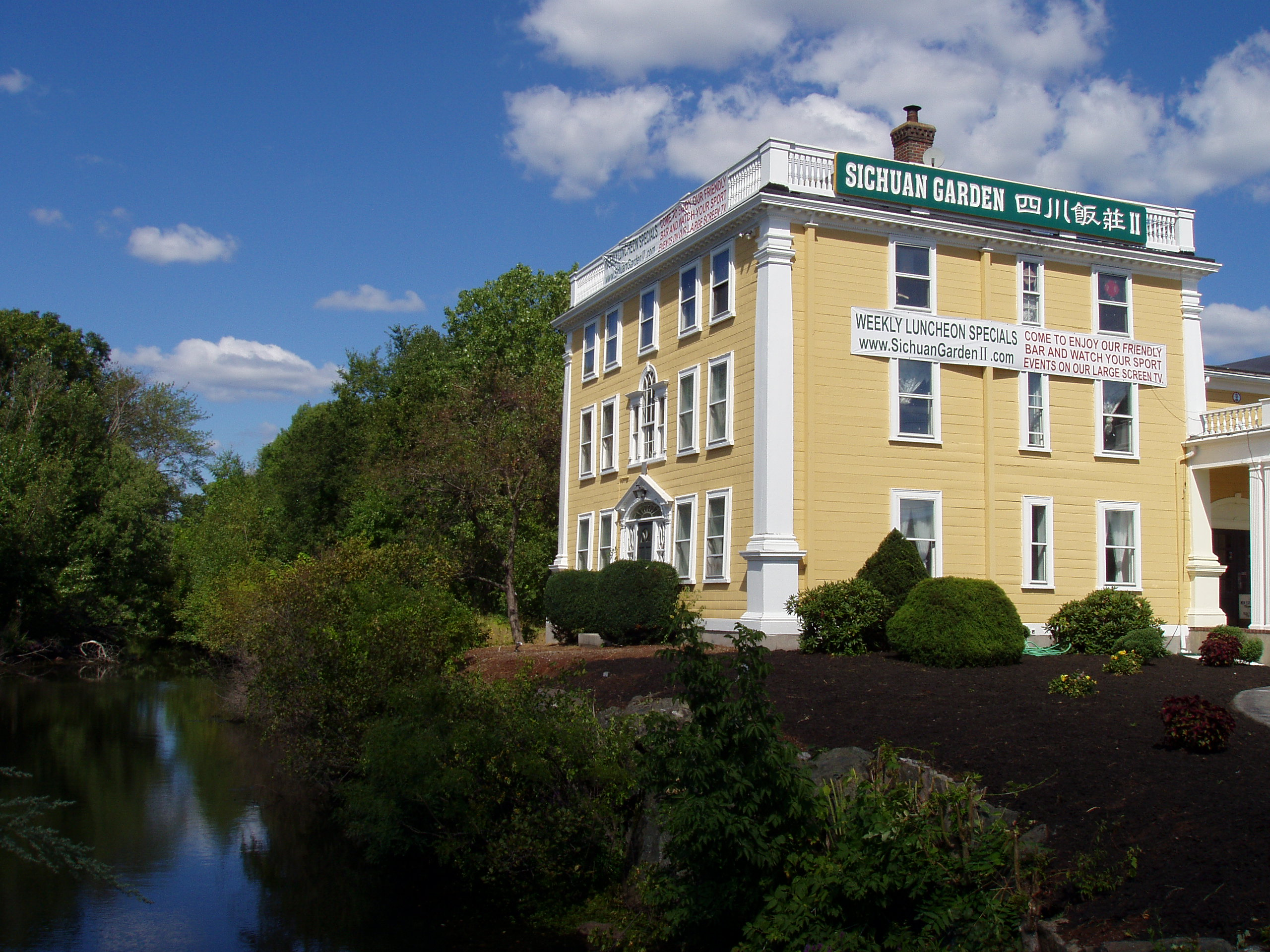
Baldwin House, Woburn, Massachusetts, with a stretch of the Middlesex Canal in foreground

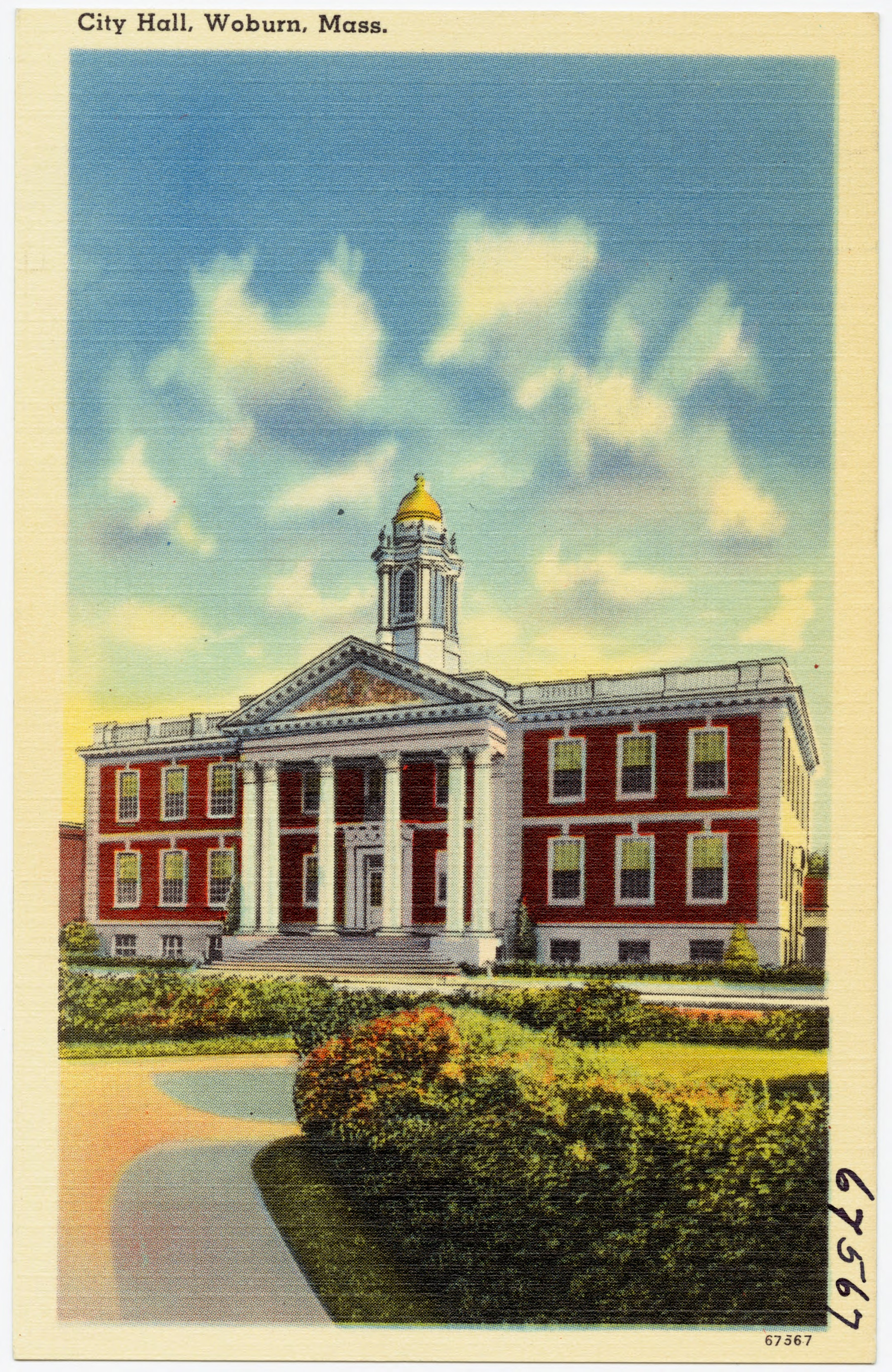
A postcard featuring Woburn City Hall

Woburn (/ˈwuːbərn/ WOO-bərn) is a city in Middlesex County, Massachusetts, United States. The population was 40,876 at the 2020 census. Woburn is located 9 miles (14 km) north of Boston. Woburn uses Massachusetts' mayor-council form of government, in which an elected mayor is the executive and a partly district-based, partly at-large city council is the legislature. It was the last of Massachusetts' 351 municipalities to refer to members of its city council as "aldermen".

== History ==
Woburn was first settled in 1640 near Horn Pond, a primary source of the Mystic River, and was officially incorporated in 1642. At that time the area included present day towns of Woburn, Winchester, Burlington, and parts of Stoneham and Wilmington. In 1730 Wilmington separated from Woburn. In 1799 Burlington separated from Woburn; in 1850 Winchester did so, too.

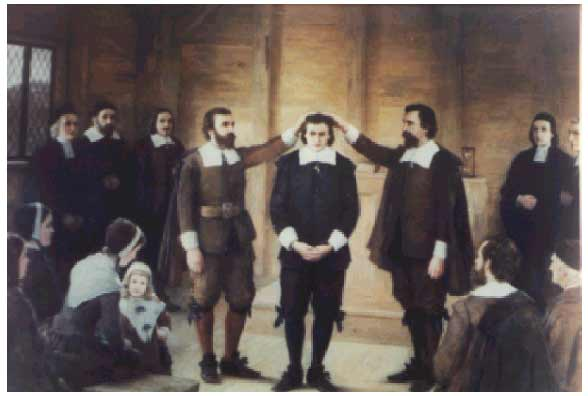
This painting depicts the ordination of Thomas Carter as minister of Woburn, Massachusetts in 1642. To his right is Captain Edward Johnson, the "Father of Woburn." The painting hangs in the Woburn Public Library.

Woburn got its name from Woburn, Bedfordshire. Woburn played host to the first religious ordination in the Americas on November 22, 1642. Rev. Thomas Carter was sworn in by many of the most prominent men of New England including John Cotton, minister of the First Church of Boston, Richard Mather minister of the First Church of Dorchester, and Capt. Edward Johnson co-founder of the church and town of Woburn. Johnson is regarded as "the father of Woburn." He served as the first town clerk, represented the town in the Massachusetts General Court, made the first map of Massachusetts, and wrote the first history of the colony.

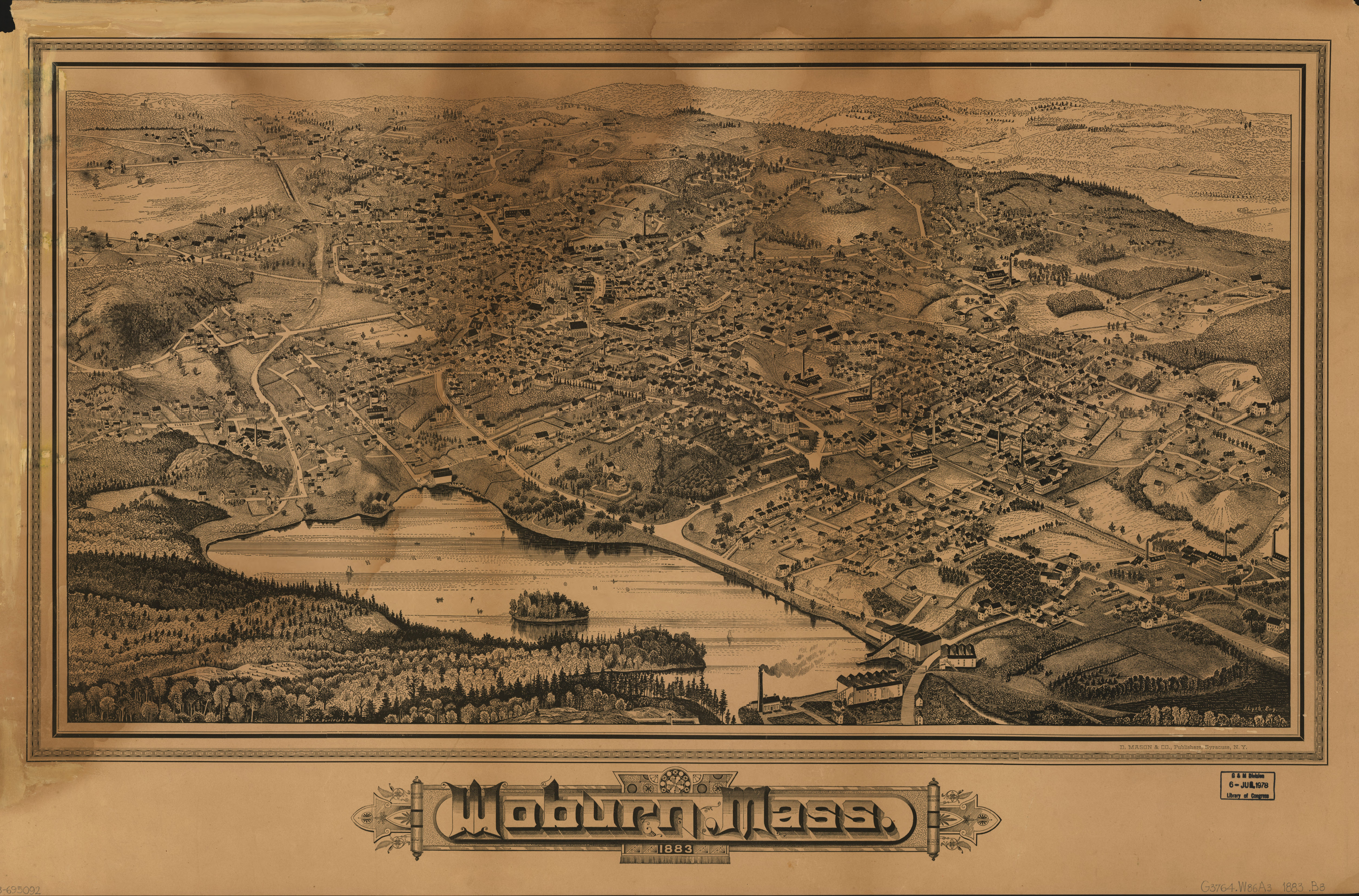
Perspective map of Woburn from 1883, J. Lyth engraver

The first organizational Town Meeting was held on April 13, 1644, and the first town officers were chosen. Town Selectmen were Edward Johnson, Edward Convers, John Mousall, William Learned, Ezekiel Richardson, Samuel Richardson, and James Thompson. William Learned was also selected as Constable. Michael Bacon, Ralph Hill, Thomas Richardson were chosen as Surveyors of Highways. (The History of Woburn, 1868)

Deacon Edward Convers was also one of the founders of Woburn. He was one of its first selectmen, and built the first house and first mill in Woburn. He was very active in town affairs and was a large landowner, miller and surveyor.

List of important events

- Gershom Flagg's tannery was built in 1668
- The Middlesex Canal was opened in 1803
- Thompson established a tannery at Cummingsville in 1823
- The Boston and Lowell Railroad started operating through Woburn in 1835
- The Woburn Sentinel newspaper began in 1839
- In 1840 the first membership library opened
- The telegraph started operating in Woburn in 1867
- "America's oldest active gun club," the Massachusetts Rifle Association, was founded in 1875 and moved to Woburn in 1876.
- The public library opened in 1879
- The telephone was introduced in Woburn in 1882; Electric lights in 1885
- Woburn was incorporated as a City on June 12, 1888
- Route 128 opened in 1951
- Route 93 was built through the town in 1963
- Rail depot closed in 1962.
- Cummings Properties, the major holder of commercial properties in the region, was founded in 1970.
- Cummings Foundation was established in 1986.
- Cummings Foundation purchased the former Choate Memorial Hospital site and turned it into the New Horizons of Choate senior living community in 1990.
- Community Weeklies Inc. was founded by William S. Cummings and began publishing Woburn Advocate in 1991. The firm was bought by a division of Fidelity Investments in 1994, and Woburn Advocate is now being published by GateHouse Media.
- Middlesex Superior Courthouse moved to TradeCenter 128 business campus in 2008.
- The final phase of construction is completed on TradeCenter 128 business campus in 2010.
- Woburn Police Officer John B. Maguire was killed in the line of duty while responding to an armed robbery on December 26, 2010.
- Massachusetts Biotechnology Council awarded Woburn the platinum-level "Bio-Ready community" designation in 2011.

=== Groundwater contamination incident ===
Woburn was the scene of a high-profile water contamination crisis. During the mid to late 1970s, the local community became concerned over the high incidence of childhood leukemia and other illnesses, particularly in the Pine Street area of east Woburn. After high levels of chemical contamination were found in City of Woburn's Wells G and H in 1979, some members of the community suspected that the unusually high incidence of leukemia, cancer, and a wide variety of other health problems were linked to the possible exposure to volatile organic compounds in the groundwater pumped from wells G and H.

In May 1982, a number of citizens whose children had developed or died from leukemia filed a civil lawsuit against two corporations, W. R. Grace and Company and Beatrice Foods. Grace's subsidiary, Cryovac, and Beatrice were suspected of contaminating the groundwater by improperly disposing of trichloroethylene (TCE), perchloroethylene (perc or PCE) and other industrial solvents at their facilities in Woburn near wells G and H.

In a controversial decision, Judge Walter Jay Skinner ruled that the jurors should answer questions that they and many others considered confusing. Beatrice was acquitted and Grace only paid $8 million, a third of which went to the lawyers and lawyer fees. A United States Environmental Protection Agency report later found Beatrice and Grace responsible for the contamination. A book titled A Civil Action was written about the case by Jonathan Harr. In 1998 the book was turned into a movie starring John Travolta and Robert Duvall, also titled A Civil Action. The film was largely filmed in nearby Bedford and Lexington, with only a few shots on location in Woburn.

== Geography ==
Woburn is located at 42°29′4″N 71°9′7″W (42.484545, −71.152060). It is bordered by the towns of Wilmington, Reading, Stoneham, Winchester, Lexington, and Burlington.

According to the United States Census Bureau, the city has a total area of 12.9 square miles (33 km^{2}), of which 12.7 square miles (33 km^{2}) is land and 0.2 square miles (0.52 km^{2}), or 1.71%, is water.

=== Climate ===
Woburn features a humid continental climate, similar to those of many of the other Boston suburban areas. It features moderately cold winters, but not usually as cold as the ones around the Great Lakes Region or Southern Canada, or even Northern New England. Nonetheless, it features occasional 'arctic blasts' which can easily drop the temperature below zero. Spring generally starts out cool, around 45-50 degrees, often with snow still on the ground. However, it quickly begins to rapidly warm to around 75 degrees by the time summer begins. Summers are generally warm or hot and often accompanied with humidity, though not nearly as bad as cities in the Midwest and Mid-Atlantic, and even Rhode Island. Temperatures often top in the 80s, but when an Atlantic low comes, temperatures may fail to rise out of the 60s. High pressure from the Gulf of Mexico, occasionally brings much hotter conditions with temperatures sometimes topping near 100, though this is fairly rare and only happens so often. Falls are generally crisp, but start out warm with temperature highs around 70 and lows around 50. Quickly things cool, and it feels and looks like winter with temperatures around 40 usually towards the end. Like most of the region, temperatures can vary widely in the span of a day.

== Demographics ==
Historical population
Year	Pop.	±%
1790	1,727	—
1800	1,228	−28.9%
1810	1,219	−0.7%
1820	1,519	+24.6%
1830	1,977	+30.2%
1840	2,993	+51.4%
1850	3,956	+32.2%
1860	6,287	+58.9%
1870	8,560	+36.2%
1880	10,931	+27.7%
1890	13,499	+23.5%
1900	14,254	+5.6%
1910	15,308	+7.4%
1920	16,574	+8.3%
1930	19,434	+17.3%
1940	19,751	+1.6%
1950	20,492	+3.8%
1960	31,214	+52.3%
1970	37,406	+19.8%
1980	36,626	−2.1%
1990	35,943	−1.9%
2000	37,258	+3.7%
2010	38,120	+2.3%
2020	40,876	+7.2%
2024*	43,895	+7.4%
* = population estimate. Source: United States census records and Population Estimates Program data. Source: U.S. Decennial Census

=== Racial and ethnic composition ===
Woburn city, Massachusetts – Racial composition
Race (NH = Non-Hispanic)	2020	2010	2000	1990	1980
White alone (NH)	72.8% (29,746)	81.7% (31,130)	89% (33,176)	95% (34,149)	97.6% (35,737)
Black alone (NH)	5.3% (2,158)	4% (1,537)	1.7% (644)	0.9% (336)	0.4% (132)
American Indian alone (NH)	0.1% (36)	0.1% (46)	0.1% (30)	0.2% (56)	0.1% (22)
Asian alone (NH)	8.5% (3,459)	7.3% (2770)	4.8% (1,804)	1.5% (537)	0.4% (151)
Pacific Islander alone (NH)	0% (6)	0% (2)	0% (16)		
Other race alone (NH)	1.8% (756)	0.9% (325)	0.2% (76)	0.1% (31)	0.1% (33)
Multiracial (NH)	5.2% (2,113)	1.5% (586)	1% (360)	—	—
Hispanic/Latino (any race)	6.4% (2,602)	4.5% (1,724)	3.1% (1,152)	2.3% (834)	1.5% (551)

=== 2020 census ===
As of the 2020 census, Woburn had a population of 40,876. The median age was 40.8 years. 18.1% of residents were under the age of 18 and 17.9% of residents were 65 years of age or older. For every 100 females there were 94.6 males, and for every 100 females age 18 and over there were 92.9 males age 18 and over.

100.0% of residents lived in urban areas, while 0.0% lived in rural areas.

There were 16,590 households in Woburn, of which 26.2% had children under the age of 18 living in them. Of all households, 46.0% were married-couple households, 19.3% were households with a male householder and no spouse or partner present, and 27.9% were households with a female householder and no spouse or partner present. About 29.5% of all households were made up of individuals and 12.1% had someone living alone who was 65 years of age or older.

There were 17,540 housing units, of which 5.4% were vacant. The homeowner vacancy rate was 0.8% and the rental vacancy rate was 6.6%.

The most reported ancestries in the 2020 census were:

- Irish (29.9%)
- Italian (19.4%)
- English (11.2%)
- German (5.6%)
- Indian (4.5%)
- French (4.3%)
- Scottish (3.9%)
- Brazilian (3.9%)
- Portuguese (3.7%)
- Polish (2.4%)

Racial composition as of the 2020 census
Race	Number	Percent
White	30,264	74.0%
Black or African American	2,232	5.5%
American Indian and Alaska Native	68	0.2%
Asian	3,469	8.5%
Native Hawaiian and Other Pacific Islander	7	0.0%
Some other race	1,686	4.1%
Two or more races	3,150	7.7%
Hispanic or Latino (of any race)	2,602	6.4%

=== 2000 census ===
As of the census of 2000, there were 37,258 people, 14,997 households, and 9,658 families residing in the city. The population density was 2,939.6 inhabitants per square mile (1,135.0/km^{2}). There were 15,391 housing units at an average density of 1,214.3 per square mile (468.8/km^{2}). The racial makeup of the city was 90.57% White, 1.87% African American, 0.10% Native American, 4.85% Asian, 0.05% Pacific Islander, 1.44% from other races, and 1.13% from two or more races. Hispanic or Latino of any race were 3.09% of the population.

There were 14,997 households, out of which 26.8% had children under the age of 18 living with them, 49.5% were married couples living together, 10.9% had a female householder with no husband present, and 35.6% were non-families. 28.7% of all households were made up of individuals, and 10.1% had someone living alone who was 65 years of age or older. The average household size was 2.47 and the average family size was 3.09.

In the city, the population was spread out, with 21.1% under the age of 18, 6.9% from 18 to 24, 34.9% from 25 to 44, 21.8% from 45 to 64, and 15.4% who were 65 years of age or older. The median age was 38 years. For every 100 females, there were 95.6 males. For every 100 females age 18 and over, there were 93.1 males.

The median income for a household in the city was $54,897, and the median income for a family was $66,364. Males had a median income of $45,210 versus $33,239 for females. The per capita income for the city was $26,207. About 4.5% of families and 6.1% of the population were below the poverty line, including 7.9% of those under age 18 and 5.4% of those age 65 or over.

== Economy ==
The Woburn Business Association (WBA) is a membership organization consisting of companies located in Woburn, Massachusetts. Memberships are also available to those firms who are situated elsewhere, but do business in Woburn. The purpose of the WBA is to promote and protect Business Interests in the City of Woburn and provide Networking Services for the Business Community.

The WBA Board of Directors meets monthly to develop policy and provide direction for the Association. The executive committee meets periodically, usually on an "as needed" basis, to review important issues and make recommendations to the Board regarding WBA policy. The WBA accomplishes its work through committees of WBA members and representatives of the Woburn community. The membership is encouraged to actively participate on these committees.

The Woburn Redevelopment Authority is an independent municipal urban renewal authority established by the City of Woburn in 1961, in accordance with Massachusetts General Laws Chapter 121B. The Authority is governed by five members, four of whom are appointed by the Mayor, and one by the Governor. The WRA functions as the city's community development agency, under an agreement with the City of Woburn executed in July 2000.

Companies based in Woburn include Boston Acoustics, Boston Metal, Kaspersky Lab USA, Monotype, Skyworks Solutions, and U-Turn Audio.

=== Top employers ===
According to the Massachusetts Executive Office of Labor and Workforce Development, the top employers in the city are:

#	Employer	# of Employees
1	Marshalls	1,000–4,999
2	NECC	500–999
3	New England Rehabilitation Hospital	500–999
4	Chomerics	500–999
5	Aberjona Valley Distributors	250–499
6	Atlantic Boston Construction	250–499
7	Cummings Properties	250–499
8	The Dolben Company	250–499
9	Peterson Party Center	250–499
10	Sanmina	250–499
11	Skyworks Solutions	250–499
12	Target	250–499
13	United Stationers Supply Company	250–499
13	Xius	250–499

== County government ==
Though the official county seats remains designated to Cambridge with a secondary northern junior-seat at Lowell (de jure), since 2008 Woburn plays host to a hand-full of Middlesex County law enforcement and court related entities: the Superior Court and District Attorney Office moved first to have their base of operations relocated from Cambridge. In 2020 the county's registrar of Probate & Family Court in Cambridge subsequently also moved their base of operations and followed by the county Sheriff's office in 2022. The county's executive branch of government was abolished in 1997, and the county still exists as a geographical and political region. The employees of Middlesex County courts, jails, registries, and other county agencies now work directly for the state though with much of these offices transferred to Woburn, (only the Registry of Deeds remaining in Cambridge).

== Education ==
Woburn's public elementary schools are the Goodyear, Altavesta, Shamrock, Malcolm White, Reeves, Linscott-Rumford, and Hurld-Wyman. The two middle schools are the John F. Kennedy and the Daniel L. Joyce. The Woburn Memorial High School Is the city's primary high school, with the Northeast Metro Tech serving as their vocational school. Woburn Public Schools also operates preschool services at the Reeves and Shamrock schools.

The Clapp, Tarkey, Plympton, Golden, Veterans' Memorial, Hurld, and Wyman schools are now closed, with most of them repurposed into public land.

St. Charles, a Pre-K–8 private Catholic school, is part of the adjacent St. Charles Parish. It has been graduating classes since 1884 in grades K–8; the high school closed in 1972.

== Public water ==
Woburn is one of the few communities close to Boston which provides its own drinking water. The city's water supply mostly comes from five wells from the underground aquifer within the Horn Pond area, which is then filtered and treated at the Horn Pond Treatment Plant. About one-third of the water is supplemented by the Massachusetts Water Resources Authority.

== Transportation ==
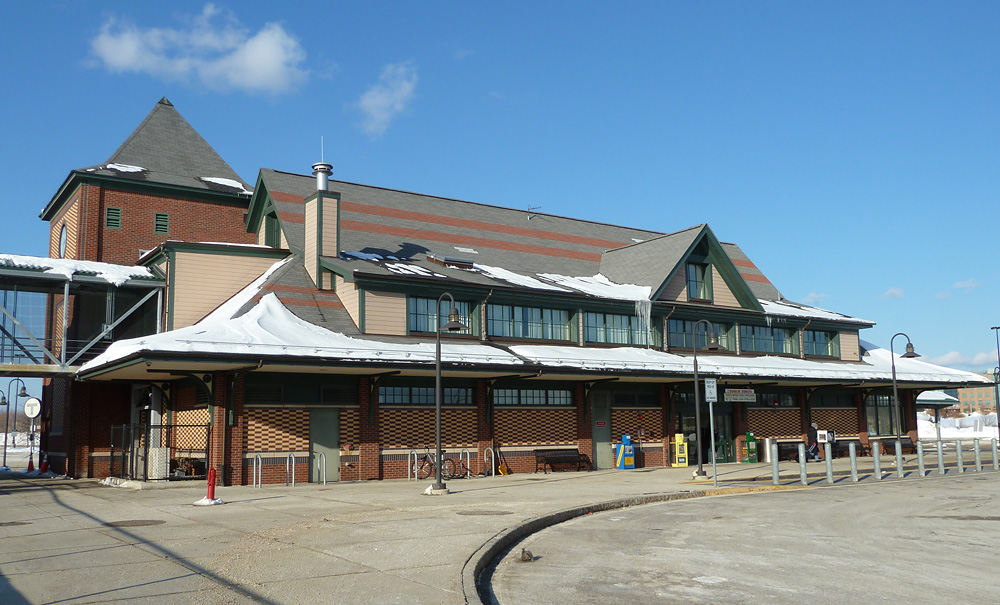
Anderson Regional Transportation Center

- Anderson Regional Transportation Center is a transit hub, with Amtrak service to Portland, Maine, and MBTA Commuter Rail service to Boston's North Station and Lowell, Massachusetts, as well as bus service to Logan International Airport and Manchester-Boston Regional Airport
- Mishawum was a stop on the MBTA Commuter Rail's Lowell Line. Service at the station ceased on December 14, 2020.
- MBTA bus routes also run through Woburn along its main roads, such as Main Street, Montvale Ave., Lexington Street and Cambridge Road. The routes run north to Burlington and Wilmington and south to Boston.

== Notable people ==
- Samuel Warren Abbott, physician
- Jane Kelley Adams, educator
- Col. Loammi Baldwin, Revolutionary War engineer, builder of Middlesex Canal
- Eric Bogosian, actor, playwright and novelist
- John Carter, former Boston Bruins player
- Edward Convers, founder of Woburn
- Christopher J. Coyne, Roman Catholic Bishop of Burlington
- Ida M. Curran, journalist and editor, Woburn City Press
- William Emmett Dever, mayor of Chicago
- Kayla Duran, soccer player
- Charles Goodyear, inventor of vulcanized rubber
- John Martyn Harlow, financier, civic leader, physician to Phineas Gage
- Steve Hoskins, professional bowler and member of the PBA Hall of Fame
- Edward Johnson, "Father of Woburn"
- Courtney Kennedy, dual Olympic medalist in hockey
- Elaine J. McCarthy, projection designer for Broadway theater and opera
- Charles McMahon, Marine Corporal, one of final two American servicemen killed in Vietnam War
- Julia O'Connor, labor leader
- Ernest Cushing Richardson, librarian, theologian and scholar
- David Robinson, rock drummer
- Charlie Sayles, blues harmonicist, singer and songwriter
- Betsey Ann Stearns, inventor
- Benjamin Thompson, Count Rumford, scientist and inventor
- Lyle R. Wheeler, five-time Academy Award-winning art-director
- Philemon Wright, regarded as founder of Canadian cities Ottawa, Ontario, and Gatineau, Quebec
- George S. Zimbel, photographer

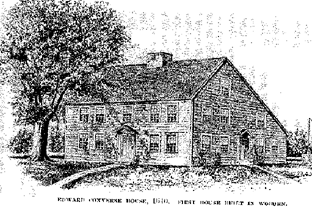
Deacon Edward Convers House, first house built in Woburn, 1640

== Points of interest ==
- 1790 House
- Baldwin House
- Benjamin Thompson House
- Winn Memorial Library, now named Woburn Public Library
- Woburn Memorial High School
- US Post Office, National Register-listed Classical Revival building
- First Congregational Church in Woburn, 1860 church belonging to a 1642 congregation
