= Bible Commonwealths =

A Bible Commonwealth is a term used to describe colonies such as Massachusetts Bay and New Haven, during the majority of the early North American Colonial Period due to Christian Scripture's strong influence on policy and life. Locally, these communities would pass blue laws, which are laws which made citizens act in accord to the Bible. An example of a blue law might be the prohibition of consuming recreational alcohol on Sundays or a ban on organized sporting events taking place on Sundays. Scripture was the basis of authority for a substantial number of criminal statues in these colonies.
