= John Myles (minister) =

Welsh Baptist minister and founder of Swansea

John Myles (c. 1621–1683) was a Welsh Baptist minister, founder of Swansea, Massachusetts, and founder of the earliest recorded Baptist churches in Wales (UK) and Massachusetts (US).

== Life ==
John Myles was born in Wales around 1621. He was educated at Brasenose College at Oxford University. After the conclusion of his studies, Myles traveled to London where he attended the Glasshouse Church, one of the earliest Baptist churches in London. There Myles became convicted of credobaptism, in contrast to paedobaptism, then afterwards returned to Ilston, Wales, where he was appointed minister and served in Wales from 1649 to 1662. He also served as a "tryer" for ministers under the Commonwealth of England, governed by Oliver Cromwell.

After the restoration of the monarchy, in 1660, and the requirement for all Puritan clerics to adhere to the Book of Common Prayer, in 1662, Myles and the Ilston congregation left England for the Plymouth Colony. Myles took the historic Ilston Book to North America with him, now located at the Library of Brown University in Providence.

In America, Myles worked with the Congregationalist state church in Rehoboth, until the former Ilston congregation was told to leave the town because of Baptist views. Myles, then, led the congregation to found the town of Swansea and to be reestablish as the First Baptist Church in Swansea. Swansea was named after the town in their homeland in Wales. Myles continued to serve as minister for more twenty years.

During King Philip's War, Myles fled from the Indians to Boston, Massachusetts, and there pastored the First Baptist Church in Boston.
