= First Baptist Church in Swansea =

Historic church in Massachusetts, United States

- U.S. National Register of Historic Places
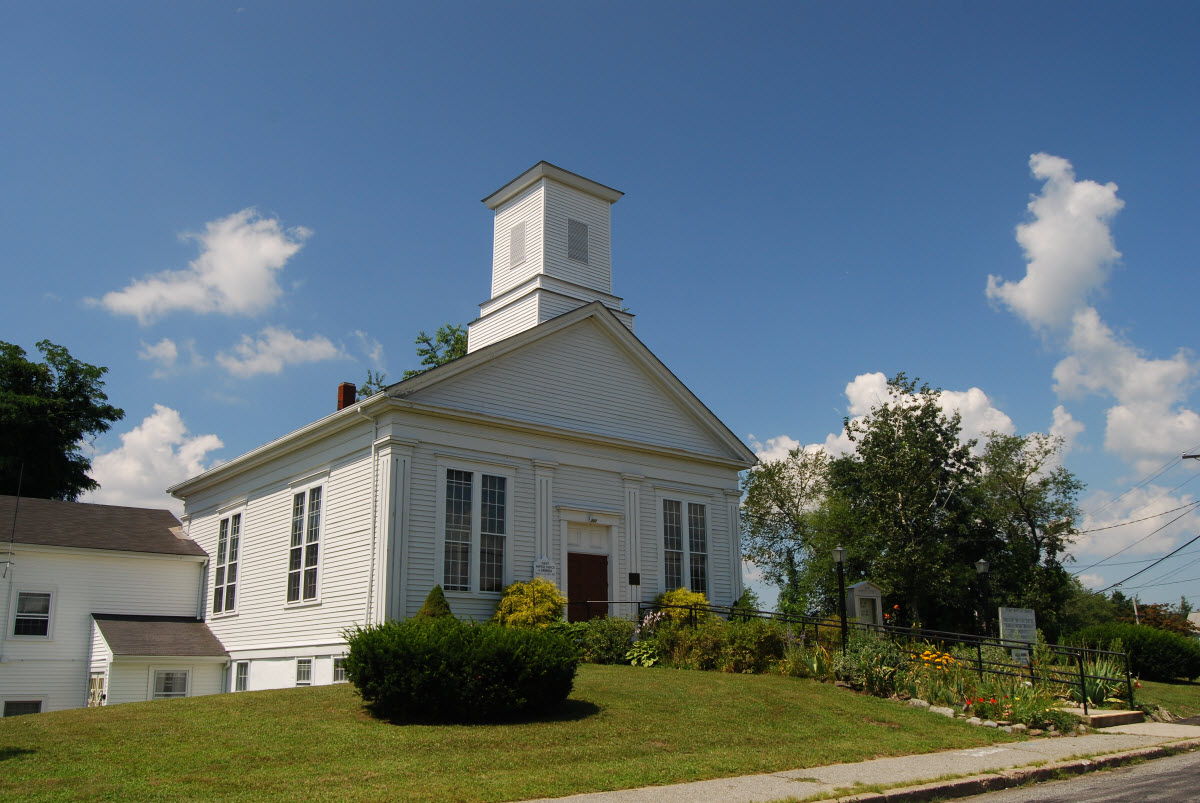

- Location within Massachusetts Location within the United States
- Location: 21 Baptist St., Swansea, Massachusetts
- Coordinates: 41°46′16″N 71°16′9″W
- Built: 1848
- Architectural style: Greek Revival
- MPS: Swansea MRA
- NRHP reference No.: 90000060
- Added to NRHP: February 16, 1990

The First Baptist Church in Swansea is a historic Baptist church in the town of Swansea, Massachusetts. The church, established in 1663, with history going back to 1649, is the oldest Baptist congregation in Massachusetts and one of the oldest in the United States.

== History ==
The congregation was founded in 1649, in Wales, by the Puritan Baptist minister John Myles. Myles brought the Ilston Book with him from Swansea, Wales, and fled to Massachusetts with the Ilston congregation, in 1662, becoming the first Baptist church in Massachusetts, in 1663. The congregation in Swansea, Massachusetts, was located relatively nearby the First Baptist Church of Providence, in Rhode Island.

== Building ==
The current Greek Revival chapel was constructed in 1848 and is the fifth building occupied by the congregation. The adjacent cemetery dates to 1731. The building and cemetery were added to the National Register of Historic Places in 1990.

== See also ==
- National Register of Historic Places listings in Bristol County, Massachusetts
- Baptists in the United States
