= Gove's Rebellion =

1683 uprising in the Province of New Hampshire

- Part of Restoration Era politics
- Date: 27 January 1683
- Location: Hampton, New Hampshire
- Result: Most of the rebels arrested; Leader of the rebellion, Edward Gove, sentenced to drawing and quartering; later pardoned

Parties
| Gove's Rebels; Puritan pro-Massachusetts faction | Colonial Government of New Hampshire |

Lead figures
| Edward Gove | Edward Cranfield |

Number
| 12 men | New Hampshire militia 400 minutemen |

Casualties and losses
| None | None |

Gove's Rebellion was a short uprising in 1683 in the Province of New Hampshire, in which Edward Gove attempted to recruit men of the towns of Exeter and Hampton to take up arms against the Royal Governor, Edward Cranfield. The rebels were arrested while attempting to muster more rebels. The leader, Edward Gove, was sentenced to death for high treason, and shipped off to London for sentencing. He was pardoned three years later by James II and returned to New Hampshire.

While the rebellion took place during the context of Restoration Era politics, a period when many American colonists were rebelling against their respective provincial governments, including Bacon's Rebellion, Coode's Rebellion, Culpeper's Rebellion, the Charter Oak Incident, and the Boston Revolt, the proximate causes were directly related to events in New Hampshire, and could be interpreted as echoes of the English Civil War.

== Background ==
Gove's Rebellion arose during a period of major political change in New England. After the Stuart Restoration, the Crown wanted to increase control over the New England Colonies, which were a hotbed of Roundhead ideology and were regularly violating the Navigation Acts. King Charles sent over the Royal Commission of 1664, for among other reasons, to increase oversight of Massachusetts.

The result of the commission did not have the intended effect, so in 1679, King Charles II separated Norfolk County from Massachusetts and established a separate royal government after 40 years of union. Although local leaders reluctantly accepted the change, many continued to identify with the province’s older Massachusetts-linked political and religious order.

At the same time, Robert Tufton Mason pressed proprietary claims to all of New Hampshire’s land, creating conflict over rents, possession, and legal title. Many of the inhabitants derived the deeds to their lands through Massachusetts and the Mason deed would invalidate their own land claims and cause them to pay quit-rents to Mason.

After two years of trying to control the new province with a government composed of local men, in 1682 the Crown installed Edward Cranfield as governor with stronger executive powers than those exercised under the earlier administration of John Cutt and a direct mandate to enforce Mason's title. Cranfield soon suspended prominent local leaders such as Richard Waldron and Richard Martyn, attempted to strengthen the courts and militia, and aligned closely with Mason’s interest. These moves sharpened opposition among many inhabitants, especially those tied to the older local and Massachusetts-oriented elite. In a gesture of good faith, Cranfield restored Waldron and Martyn a month later.

=== Edward Gove Background ===
Gove moved to Hampton, New Hampshire in 1665 after selling his land in Salisbury, Massachusetts. His wife's name was Hannah Titcomb. They had been married several years before removing to Hampton. He had the ninth largest landholdings in Hampton according to the 1680 property assessment.

During the Cutt administration, Gove was elected a member to the New Hampshire assembly. In 1680, he was appointed to a sub-committee to a property assessor subcommittee. He was a member of the First Church in Hampton and aligned in the Assembly with the pro-Massachusetts faction led by Richard Waldron. He does not appear in official Massachusetts or New Hampshire, or Norfolk County political records prior to 1680, so it is likely he did not have a career in politics prior to the separation of New Hampshire from Massachusetts.

He was known as a heavy drinker and based on records used in his defense, may have had a family history of mental illness.

== Rebellion ==
In mid January 1683, Edward Gove, a now former councilor from Hampton, discussed the idea of rebelling against the governor with other New Hampshire and Massachusetts leaders including Richard Waldron, Richard Martyn, and William Vaughan. He also claimed to have the support of Thomas Danforth. Though they were not allies of Cranfield, they advised against armed rebellion.

However, since Gove had been drinking, he decided to rise up anyway. He armed himself, his son, and his servant, and rode his horse to Exeter in an attempt to muster the citizens to rebel against the governor. Along the way, he was stopped by a justice of the peace, Nathaniel Weare (father of Meshech Weare). Gove and his party escaped capture and continued to Exeter, where they succeeded in gathering roughly a dozen armed supporters to the cause. The rebels now returned to Hampton to rally more men to their cause. One man blew a trumpet, and the group caused a ruckus to attract the attention of the townsfolk. It managed to attract the local militia, who proceeded to arrest all but one of the rebels, the trumpeter.

== Trial ==
After the arrest, Cranfield wanted to make an example of their leader. The rebels were indicted on February 1. A Court of Oyer and Terminer was convened for February 15, with Richard Waldron, Thomas Daniels, and William Vaughan presiding.

Edward Gove was tried by a grand jury which, at the influence of Governor Cranfield, was composed of a mixture of Puritan and royally inclined non-Puritans. Gove initially pleaded not guilty and proceeded to attack the validity of the court. He claimed that Cranfield was invalidly appointed because his commission was signed in Scotland and because his proclamation of a holiday on January 30 was treason against New England.

He was found guilty of high treason after six hours of deliberations. The presiding judge, Major Richard Waldron, sentenced him to be hanged, drawn and quartered in accordance with English law.

=== List of Rebels ===
As many of the men Edward Gove recruited were, in fact, teenage boys, their parents were the ones who petitioned the governor and the king for clemency after the trial of Edward Gove.

For example, John Sleeper, whose father Thomas sent a petition to the king: “My eldest son [John] being on the road met with Edward Gove, and weakly consented to go with him, knowing nothing of his design. He is now found guilty of high treason. I am seventy-five years old, and have always been a loyal subject, and this has broken my heart in my old age. I beg your gracious clemency towards him.”

== Aftermath ==
Governor Cranfield, worried that Gove would escape the Castle and rouse further rebellion, sent him to Boston, and eventually to London. Though the rebellion was brief and settled peacefully, the act of rebellion further convinced Cranfield and Edward Randolph that New Hampshire was becoming an ungovernable place. The rebellion was used as further justification for King James to revoke all New England colonial charters to form the Dominion of New England.

After the trial, Cranfield again suspended Richard Waldron and Richard Martyn from the New Hampshire Executive Council. He also kept the provincial militia activated for months.

Gove was imprisoned in the tower of London for almost three years awaiting his execution. His wife pleaded to King Charles and later King James to release her husband, which the latter eventually did. He returned to New Hampshire.

== See also ==
- Edward Randolph
- Edward Cranfield
- Massachusetts Bay Colony
- Dominion of New England
- Quitrent
- Anti-Rent War
