= List of colonial governors of New Hampshire =

The territory of the present United States state of New Hampshire has a colonial history dating back to the 1620s. This history is significantly bound to that of the neighboring Massachusetts, whose colonial precursors either claimed the New Hampshire territory, or shared governors with it. First settled in the 1620s under a land grant to John Mason, the colony consisted of a small number of settlements near the seacoast before growing further inland in the 18th century. Mason died in 1635, and the colonists appropriated a number of his holdings. Thomas Roberts served as the last Colonial Governor of the Dover Colony before it became part of the Massachusetts Bay Colony. Between 1641 and 1644, the New Hampshire towns each voted to be annexed by Massachusetts Bay Colony, which also claimed the territory. Massachusetts governed the settlements as Norfolk County until 1680 when King Charles II forced a separation and it became the royally chartered Province of New Hampshire. It was initially governed by a President in conjunction with an executive council in an attempt to solve a land dispute between Massachusetts and the heirs of John Mason. In 1686 the territory became part of the Dominion of New England, which was effectively disbanded in 1689 following the 1688 Glorious Revolution in England. After an interregnum under de facto rule from Massachusetts, Samuel Allen, who had acquired the Mason land claims, became governor. From 1699 to 1741 the governorships of New Hampshire and the Province of Massachusetts Bay were shared.

Boundary disputes between the two colonies prompted King George II to appoint separate governors in 1741, commissioning Portsmouth native Benning Wentworth as governor. In 1775, with the advent of the American Revolutionary War, the province's last royal governor, John Wentworth, fled the colony. Under a state constitution drafted in early 1776, Meshech Weare was chosen the first president of the independent state of New Hampshire.

== Lower plantation governors, 1630–1641 ==
Permanent English settlement began after land grants were issued in 1622 to John Mason and Sir Ferdinando Gorges for the territory between the Merrimack and Sagadahoc (Kennebec) rivers, roughly encompassing present-day New Hampshire and western Maine. Settlers, whose early leaders included David Thomson, Edward Hilton, and Thomas Hilton, began settlements on the New Hampshire coast and islands as early as 1623, that eventually expanded along the shores of the Piscataqua River and the Great Bay. Mason and Gorges, neither of whom ever came to New England, divided their claims along the Piscataqua River in 1629. Mason took the territory between the Piscataqua and Merrimack, and called it "New Hampshire", after the English county of Hampshire.

Conflicts between holders of grants issued by Mason and Gorges concerning their boundaries eventually led to a need for more active management. Captain Walter Neale was appointed in 1630 by the proprietors of the Strawbery Banke (or "Lower") plantation (present-day Portsmouth and nearby communities) as agent and governor of that territory. Neale returned to England in 1633, and John Mason appointed Francis Williams to govern the lower plantation in 1634. Early New Hampshire historian Jeremy Belknap called Williams the governor of the lower plantation, and claimed that he served until the New Hampshire plantations came under Massachusetts rule, at which time he became a magistrate in the Massachusetts government. However, Belknap's claim is disputed by historian Charles Tuttle, who observes that there are no records prior to 1640 in which Mason or Gorges refer to Williams as governor. Tuttle claims that Mason appointed Henry Josselyn to succeed Neale, and that Mason's widow appointed Francis Norton, a Massachusetts resident, in 1638 to oversee the estate's interests, although when his stewardship ends is unclear.

Governor	Took office	Left office	Ref
Walter Neale	1630	1633	
Francis Williams	1634?	1641	
Henry Josselyn	1634	1638	
Francis Norton	1638	1640?	

== Upper plantation governors, 1631–1641 ==
The first governor of the "Dover" or "Upper Plantation" was Captain Thomas Wiggin. The exact date of his appointment is uncertain. He was known to be in the area in 1629 and 1631, when Belknap suggests he was appointed governor by Mason and Gorges. He received a more definite appointment for administration of this plantation by 1633, when he was commissioned by Lords Brooke and Say and Sele, who had purchased land in the area from Mason.

The territory then comprised modern-day Dover, Durham, and Stratham. Wiggin is styled in some histories as a governor, and was referred to in contemporary documentation as "[having the] power of Governor hereabouts". However, his powers appear to have been limited to transacting the proprietors' business, including the granting of land, and the proprietors themselves did not possess the power of government. Wiggin and Walter Neale apparently disagreed on territorial boundaries of their respective domains, and supposedly almost came to blows, although whether this occurred in 1632 or 1633 is unclear. In the fall of 1637 the upper communities banded together and formed a government headed by the Rev. George Burdett.

Governor	Took office	Left office	Ref
Thomas Wiggin	1633?	1637	
George Burdett	1637	1641	

== Massachusetts governors, 1641–1680 ==
Mason's widow decided in 1638 to abandon financial support of the colony. After shifting for themselves for a time (during which much of the Mason property was appropriated by the colonists), the plantations of New Hampshire voted in 1641 to join with the Massachusetts Bay Colony and thus were incorporated into Old Norfolk County. The towns of New Hampshire sent representatives to the Massachusetts legislature, and were governed by its governors, who were elected annually. Many men reached high levels of Massachusetts government, most notably Richard Waldron.

Governor		Took office	Left office	Deputy governor
Thomas Dudley		May 13, 1640	June 2, 1641	Richard Bellingham
Richard Bellingham		June 2, 1641	May 18, 1642	John Endecott
John Winthrop		May 18, 1642	May 29, 1644	John Endecott
John Endecott		May 29, 1644	May 14, 1645	John Winthrop
Thomas Dudley		May 14, 1645	May 6, 1646	John Winthrop
John Winthrop		May 6, 1646	May 2, 1649	Thomas Dudley
John Endecott		May 2, 1649	May 22, 1650	Thomas Dudley
Thomas Dudley		May 22, 1650	May 7, 1651	John Endecott
John Endecott		May 7, 1651	May 3, 1654	Thomas Dudley
Richard Bellingham		May 3, 1654	May 23, 1655	John Endecott
John Endecott		May 23, 1655	May 3, 1665	Richard Bellingham
Richard Bellingham		May 3, 1665	December 12, 1672	Francis Willoughby (1665–71)
Richard Bellingham		May 3, 1665	December 12, 1672	John Leverett (1671–72)
John Leverett	A portrait of Leverett in black clothing and a cap.	December 12, 1672 (acting until May 7, 1673)	May 28, 1679	Samuel Symonds (1673–78)
John Leverett	A portrait of Leverett in black clothing and a cap.	December 12, 1672 (acting until May 7, 1673)	May 28, 1679	Simon Bradstreet (1678–80)
Simon Bradstreet	A head and shoulders portrait of Bradstreet, who wears a gold-peach robe over a black shirt and white cravat. His shoulder-length hair is topped with a small black cap.	May 28, 1679	January 21, 1680	Thomas Danforth
Sources unless otherwise cited: Capen, pp. 53–54; Hart, p. 1:607

== First provincial period, 1680–1686 ==
In 1679, in an attempt to weaken Massachusetts, King Charles II issued a royal charter for the Province of New Hampshire. John Cutt was appointed president of a royal council, and took office on January 21, 1680. He was succeeded after his death by his deputy, Richard Waldron. At the urging of Robert Tufton Mason, the heir of John Mason, who was trying to recover his inherited claims, Charles issued a stronger, new charter in 1682, with Edward Cranfield as lieutenant governor. This government survived until the Dominion of New England was introduced in 1686, although Cranfield departed the province in 1685, replaced in the interim by his deputy, Walter Barefoote.

Lieutenant-Governor	Commissioned	Took office	Left office
John Cutt (as president of council)	September 18, 1679	January 21, 1680	March 1681
Richard Waldron (as president [acting])	January 22, 1680	March 1681	October 4, 1682
Edward Cranfield	May 9, 1682	October 4, 1682	June 9, 1685
Walter Barefoote (acting)	–	June 9, 1685	May 25, 1686
Source unless otherwise cited: Fry, p. 523

== Dominion of New England and interregnum ==
From 1686 to 1689 the province was joined into the Dominion of New England. After the dominion collapsed in April 1689, the New Hampshire communities were left without government. Although they briefly established a government in January 1690, they petitioned Massachusetts for protection, and Massachusetts Governor Simon Bradstreet de facto governed the colony from March 1690.

Governor		Took office	Left office	Lieutenant Governor
Joseph Dudley (as President of the Council of New England)	A half-length oil portrait of Joseph Dudley, wearing a magistrate's robe.	May 25, 1686	December 20, 1686	William Stoughton (as Deputy President)
Sir Edmund Andros	A half-length portrait of Edmund Andros. He wears metal plate armor, and a lace collar or cravat is visible.	December 20, 1686	April 18, 1689	Francis Nicholson (appointed April 1688)
Simon Bradstreet (as de facto governor)	A head and shoulders portrait of Bradstreet, who wears a gold-peach robe over a black shirt and white cravat. His shoulder-length hair is topped with a small black cap.	March 19, 1690	1692	Thomas Danforth

== Second provincial period, 1692–1775 ==
From 1692 to 1699, Samuel Allen was the governor of New Hampshire. For most of his tenure, he remained in London, pursuing legal actions relevant to proprietary land claims he had purchased from the Masons, but he came to the colony briefly before the arrival of his replacement as governor, the Earl of Bellomont. From 1699 to 1741, the governor of the Province of Massachusetts Bay was also commissioned as governor of New Hampshire. The lieutenant governor controlled the province, acting as governor unless the commissioned governor was present. In 1741 the governance of Massachusetts and New Hampshire was divided. As a result, during the tenures of the last two governors, Benning and John Wentworth, the role of the lieutenant governor diminished. John Temple, the last lieutenant governor, apparently held the office in title only.

One commission was issued but not used. On February 8, 1715/6, Colonel Elizeus Burges was appointed to succeed Joseph Dudley as governor of both Massachusetts and New Hampshire. Before coming to North America, Burges was bribed by Massachusetts operatives to resign his commissions; Colonel Samuel Shute was then chosen to replace Dudley.

The column labeled "Commissioned" indicates the date when the governor's commission was issued in London, and does not represent when the governor arrived in the province to formally take up the government. The column labeled "Left office" shows the date when the individual was replaced by the arrival of his successor, with a few exceptions. Two governors, Bellomont and William Burnet, died while still holding their commissions (although neither was in the province at the time). Governor Shute effectively abandoned his office by abruptly departing Boston for England on January 1, 1723. His administration effectively came to an end then, but he was technically the office holder until Burnet was commissioned in 1728. The last governor, John Wentworth, fled the province in August 1775, after the outbreak of the American Revolutionary War brought threats to his rule and family. The province was thereafter governed provisionally until January 1776, when Meshech Weare was elected the independent state's first president under a new state constitution.

Governor		Commissioned	Left office	Lieutenant Governor	Notes
Samuel Allen		March 1, 1691/2	July 31, 1699	John Usher (1692–97)	Allen was largely absentee, only arriving in the province in September 1698, well after Bellomont's appointment was known.
Samuel Allen		March 1, 1691/2	July 31, 1699	William Partridge (1699–1701)	Allen was largely absentee, only arriving in the province in September 1698, well after Bellomont's appointment was known.
Richard Coote, 1st Earl of Bellomont	A black and white half-length engraved portrait of Bellomont. He wears a uniform adorned with military honors.	June 18, 1697	March 5, 1701/2	William Partridge (1699–1701)	Bellomont was only in the province from July 31 to August 18, 1699. He died on March 5, 1701/2.
Vacant				William Partridge (1699–1701)	
Joseph Dudley		April 1, 1702	October 7, 1716	John Usher (1702–1715)	
Vacant				George Vaughan (1715–17)	
Samuel Shute		May 10, 1716	January 1, 1723	George Vaughan (1715–17)	
Samuel Shute		May 10, 1716	January 1, 1723	John Wentworth (elder) (1717–30)	
Vacant				John Wentworth (elder) (1717–30)	
William Burnet	A half length portrait of William Burnet.	December 19, 1727?	September 7, 1729	John Wentworth (elder) (1717–30)	Burnet was only in the province from April to May 1729, and died the following September.
Vacant				John Wentworth (elder) (1717–30)	Wentworth's lieutenant governorship briefly overlapped Belcher's administration.
Jonathan Belcher	A head and shoulders portrait detail of Jonathan Belcher in middle age. He wears a wig and a reddish-brown jacket.	December 11, 1729	December 12, 1741	David Dunbar (1730–37)	
Jonathan Belcher	A head and shoulders portrait detail of Jonathan Belcher in middle age. He wears a wig and a reddish-brown jacket.	December 11, 1729	December 12, 1741	Vacant	
Benning Wentworth	A full-length portrait of Benning Wentworth. He faces left, looking toward the painter. Dressed in a blue suit, his right hand rests on a cane. In the background is a window through which a tropical view is visible.	June 4, 1741	July 30, 1767	Vacant	Wentworth was a son of the elder John Wentworth.
Benning Wentworth	A full-length portrait of Benning Wentworth. He faces left, looking toward the painter. Dressed in a blue suit, his right hand rests on a cane. In the background is a window through which a tropical view is visible.	June 4, 1741	July 30, 1767	John Temple (titular only, 1762–74)	Wentworth was a son of the elder John Wentworth.
John Wentworth (younger)	A half length portrait of John Wentworth. He faces right but looks toward the painter. He wears a powdered wig and fashionable mid-18th century clothing.	August 11, 1766	August 24, 1775	John Temple (titular only, 1762–74)	Wentworth was grandson of the elder John Wentworth and nephew to Benning Wentworth.
Source unless otherwise cited: The Federal and State Constitutions, Volume 4, pp. 2527–2531
