= Walter Barefoote =

English settler of northern New England

Walter Barefoote (also Barefoot, fl. 1655 – d. 1688) was colonist and deputy governor of the Province of New Hampshire. From 1685 to 1686 he served as acting governor of the province.

Little is known of his origin, although genealogists believe he may be descended from Ezekiel Culverwell, a prominent English Puritan of the late 16th century. He came to the New World in the 1650s, purchasing a house in Kittery, Maine in 1658. He did not stay long in Kittery, selling the house there in 1661 and establishing a medical practice in nearby Dover, New Hampshire in 1661. Despite his claimed Puritan family connections he was a confirmed Anglican, opposing the Puritan rule of the New Hampshire settlements by Massachusetts Bay Colony, and lending assistance to Quakers Puritans were trying to drive out of the province in 1662.

When the Province of New Hampshire was chartered in 1680, Barefoote served as a deputy collector of customs during John Cutt's administration. He was appointed a councilor of the province when Edward Cranfield was appointed governor in 1682. He was appointed deputy governor in January 1683, and became acting governor when Cranfield left the province in 1685 and continued to enforce Robert Tufton Mason's land claims. He served as acting governor until the province was absorbed into the Dominion of New England, on whose council he also sat.

His will was written in early October 1688, and was formally proven in February 1688/9. His exact date of death is presumed to fall between these dates. Family details are unknown; his will mentions neither a wife nor children.

== In popular culture ==
In July 1682, he was living on Great Island, New Hampshire where he was a witness to the Lithobolia, or stone-throwing devil.

Government offices
Preceded by Edward Cranfield	Governor of the Province of New Hampshire (acting); 1685-86	Succeeded by Joseph Dudley as President of the Council of New England
