= John Cutt =

President of New Hampshire
- In office 1680–1681
- Preceded by: Office Established
- Succeeded by: Richard Waldron

Member of the Great and General Court of Massachusetts from Portsmouth
- In office 1676–1676
- Preceded by: Richard Cutt
- Succeeded by: Elias Stileman

Personal details
- Born: 1613 Wales, Great Britain
- Died: April 5, 1681 (age 68) Portsmouth, New Hampshire
- Spouse(s): Hannah Starr, Ursula
- Children: John, Elizabeth, Hannah, Mary, Samuel
- Occupation: President (Governor) of colonial New Hampshire and merchant, magistrate, councilor.

John Cutt (1613 – April 5, 1681) was a colonial mill owner and politician who became the first president of the royal council of the Province of New Hampshire after it was established as an independent province. He was opposed to the land claims of Robert Tufton Mason and worked to ensure New Hampshire remained aligned with Massachusetts Puritan policies.

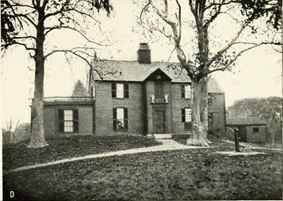
President Cutt's widow, Ursula, built her house at the Cutt family's Pulpit Farm between 1681 and 1685

== Life in Portsmouth ==
Cutt was born in Wales, emigrated to New England in 1646 with his two brothers, Richard and Robert, and sister Anne during the Great Migration. He became a successful merchant and mill owner in Portsmouth, New Hampshire. He was married to Hannah Starr, daughter of Dr. Comfort Starr of Boston, a founder of Harvard College and a surgeon who emigrated from Ashford, Kent, England. Starr is buried in King's Chapel Burying Ground, Boston. The marriage was celebrated in Boston on July 30, 1662 and was officiated by Samuel Danforth.

In the mid-1640s, Richard Cutt and Henry Sherburne take control of Mason’s Great House in New Castle.

While in Portsmouth, John Cutt worked to build his fortune. Between him and his brother Richard, they owned most of the land that make up downtown Portsmouth. Their brother Robert split his time between Portsmouth and Barbados. The two elder Cutt brothers become involved in Portsmouth governance.

=== Political career ===
In 1653, Richard Cutt’s name first appears in the historical record as a signatory on several official petitions addressed to the Massachusetts General Court.

In 1657, Richard is selected by the Board of Selectmen to be an Associate to the County Court. The same year, he and John are part of a 5-member committee to design and build a meeting house for Portsmouth. That building was the first church on the site of the North Church

During a visit from the Carr-Cartwright Commission, Richard Cutt appears to have insulted the kings commissioners and physically threatened two people for talking to the commission because John Cutt signed a letter of affidavit affirming that the royal commissioners legally accept Richard’s apology.

In 1665, He and his brother along with Elias Stileman and Nathaniel Frier were the Portsmouth Board of Selectmen.

1669, while on Board of Selectmen, John, Richard, Rev. Joshua Moody write letter to General Court pledging 60 pounds per year for seven years from the inhabitants of Portsmouth for Harvard University.

In 1676, Richard Cutt died and John filled his seat in the Massachusetts General Court. It is the only year he served, but he had received magisterial powers for the three preceding years.

== President of the Royal Council ==
=== Background to the Presidency ===
In the 1670s, Robert Tufton Mason attempted to acquire the land of New Hampshire to turn it into his personal proprietary colony based on the deed granted to John Mason. He attempted to sue major New Hampshire landowners in England but the English Courts decided that they didn’t have jurisdiction and refused to hear the case. Massachusetts, which had administered New Hampshire since 1640 and fully incorporated it into its territory, flatly refused to hear the case. Robert Mason persuaded King Charles II to create a new province on the territory which would have jurisdiction over his claim.

In 1676, John Cutt was on a committee with Richard Martin, Elias Stileman, and Thomas Daniel to draft a petition to King Charles II urging him not to create the province with Mason in charge. They cite the Wheelwright Deed and their years of cultivation of the land as the reasons they were the proper owners of Portsmouth

=== President of the Council ===
On January 1, 1680, John Cutt became the first president of the royal Province of New Hampshire, when Norfolk County was first separated from the Massachusetts Bay Colony. Cutt was the head of the seven-member royal provincial council. Aside from Cutt, the other members of the Council were Richard Martin, William Vaughan, and Thomas Daniel of Portsmouth, Richard Waldron of Dover, John Gilman of Exeter and Christopher Hussey of Hampton. An early copy of the document appointing Cutt and his council is now preserved by the State of New Hampshire. That charter is one of two royal charters that New Hampshire received during British rule. The charter and commission was brought to Portsmouth by Edward Randolph.

After his appointment, the first meeting of the governing council was March 16. The session was opened with a sermon and prayer by Rev. Joshua Moody, the Puritan minister of Portsmouth.

As President, John Cutt was opposed to the Mason land claims. One of his first official acts as president was to send a letter to King Charles II acknowledging the receipt of the commission and to affirm their loyalty to him and let him know they were implementing English law to the best of their ability. Towards the end of the letter he thanked the king for allowing the province to be governed by the leading men of New Hampshire and to express his hope of behalf of New Hampshire that the King wouldn’t appoint “…any pretended claimers to our soil…,” a reference to Robert Mason.

The second official letter was sent to Governor Dudley of Massachusetts thanking his for the decades of Massachusetts administration and to apologize for independence. His priority for the Council was to set up a form of government for New Hampshire that mirrored as close as possible what the people were used to from the decades under Massachusetts administration.

However, when Robert Mason produced a writ of mandamus, Cutt was forced to admit him to the Governor’s Council. Mason joined and assumed the title Lord Proprietor.

Soon after his appointment he fell ill. On March 1, 1681, the provincial Council and General Assembly designated March 17, 1681, as a Fast Day, "A day of public fasting and prayer." The Council and Assembly believed Cutt's illness and the recent sighting of a comet were signs of "divine displeasure"; John Cutt died on April 5, 1681.

After his Cutt's death, Richard Waldron was named acting president.

In accordance with his will, he is buried next to his first wife Hannah who died in 1677. She is buried in Portsmouth's South Cemetery; her tombstone is there while his is missing.

== Family ==
Coat of Arms of John Cutt

John Cutt was accompanied from Wales to Portsmouth by two brothers, Richard and Robert. A descendant of brother Robert Cutt was Hon. Hampden Cutts (as the family styled themselves, with the 's' in succeeding generations) of North Hartland, Vermont. Hampden Cutts married Mary Pepperrell Sparhawk Jarvis, daughter of William Jarvis of Weathersfield, Vermont, and the man who introduced merino sheep to America. Cutts's wife Mary Jarvis was herself a descendant of John Cutt through her father.

Government offices
Preceded by Simon Bradstreet as Governor of Massachusetts Bay Colony	President of the Province of New Hampshire; 1680-1681	Succeeded by Richard Waldron (acting)
