= John Usher (colonist) =

English Colonial Official (1648–1726)

Coat of Arms of John Usher

John Usher (27 April 1648 – September 1726) was an English colonial administrator. Born in Boston, he served as treasurer of the Dominion of New England from 1686 until the Boston Revolt of 1689. After the revolt, dominion governor Sir Edmund Andros was confined in Usher's home. Usher was twice lieutenant governor of the Province of New Hampshire (1692–1697 and 1702–1715). As lieutenant governor, he frequently held the reins of power, since the governors (his father-in-law Samuel Allen, and Joseph Dudley) were often absent from the province. His rule was unpopular. He died in Medford, Massachusetts, on September 5, 1726.

Usher's father, Hezekiah, was the first known bookseller in colonial America. He also printed the first book in the Thirteen Colonies: 1640 Bay Psalm Book.
