= Robert Tufton Mason =

English colonial official

Member of the Council of the Dominion of New England
- In office 1686 – September 1688
- Governor: Sir Edmund Andros

Member of the Provincial Council of New Hampshire
- In office 1680–1686
- President: John Cutt
- Governor: Edward Cranfield

Personal details
- Born: Robert Tufton; 1635 England
- Died: September 1688 (aged 52–53) Kingston, New York, Province of New York
- Spouse: Elizabeth Taylor
- Relations: Captain John Mason (grandfather)
- Parent(s): Joseph Tufton; Anne Mason
- Known for: Proprietor and claimant to the Province of New Hampshire

Robert Tufton Mason (1635 – September 1688) was an English proprietor, colonial official, and claimant to the Province of New Hampshire. As the grandson and principal heir of Captain John Mason, founder of New Hampshire, Robert spent several decades petitioning the English Crown to recognize his proprietary title to the soil. He contested the expansion of the Massachusetts Bay Colony, and attempted to collect quitrents from New England settlers. His persistent legal challenges at Whitehall were instrumental in King Charles II's decision to sever New Hampshire from Massachusetts jurisdiction in 1679 and constitute it as a separate royal province.

Mason later served as a member of New Hampshire's provincial council under President John Cutt and Governor Edward Cranfield, and subsequently on the council of the Dominion of New England under Sir Edmund Andros. His efforts to enforce ejectment suits and extract quitrents sparked widespread colonial civil disobedience and tax resistance.

== Early life and inheritance ==
Robert Tufton was born in England in 1635, the youngest of the five children of Joseph Tufton of Betchworth, Surrey, and Anne Mason. His maternal grandfather, Captain John Mason, was a merchant, naval commander, and governor of the Avalon colony in Newfoundland, who had received successive proprietary patents between 1622 and 1635 from the Plymouth Council for New England encompassing the territory between the Merrimack and Piscataqua Rivers.

Captain John Mason died in London in December 1635, only months after Robert's birth. Under the terms of his grandfather's will, the New Hampshire territorial claims were devised first to Robert's elder brother, John Tufton, with the stipulation that the heir adopt the surname Mason upon reaching adulthood. Following John Tufton's death in his youth without issue, the estate descended to Robert, who had assumed the surname Mason by 12 November 1655, when he administered his grandmother's estate. Mason married Elizabeth, daughter of William Taylor of Bradley, Hampshire. They had at least three children: John, born about 1659, Robert, and Elizabeth.

During Mason's minority, the turmoil of the English Civil War and the subsequent Interregnum diverted the attention of English authorities from colonial administrative affairs. Taking advantage of the unsettled title and the isolation of the northern towns, the Massachusetts Bay Colony extended its jurisdiction northward over Portsmouth, Dover, Exeter, and Hampton between 1641 and 1643, granting municipal charters and lands without reference to the Mason patent.

== Petitions to the Crown ==
Following the Restoration of King Charles II in 1660, Mason pursued legal restitution for his ancestral lands. In 1675, Mason submitted a comprehensive petition to the Crown detailing his title and charging Massachusetts with unlawful usurpation. The Crown referred the claim to Attorney General William Jones and Solicitor General Sir Francis Winnington, who examined the seventeenth-century patents and reported that Robert Tufton Mason had good legal title to the soil, though they maintained he possessed no governmental jurisdiction or authority over administration.

In 1676, in the midst of King Phillip's War, the English official Edward Randolph was dispatched to Boston to deliver royal letters requiring the Massachusetts government to send representatives to London to answer Mason's claims and those of the heirs of Sir Ferdinando Gorges concerning Maine. Randolph was also a cousin to Mason. Massachusetts sent agents William Stoughton and Peter Bulkeley, who formally disclaimed governmental jurisdiction over the region north of the Merrimack border established by royal judges in London.

To resolve the impasse and extend direct crown control over New England trade, Charles II issued a royal commission in July 1679 establishing New Hampshire as a separate royal province. The Province of New Hampshire was the first royal colony in New England.

== Conflict in New Hampshire ==
=== Cutt administration ===
The royal government of New Hampshire took effect in early 1680 under a local provincial council headed by President John Cutt, a leading merchant of Portsmouth. Mason was appointed a member of the council by royal writ of mandamus and arrived in the province in December 1680, settling on the royalist Great Island.

Upon arrival, Mason assumed the role of Lord Proprietor, asserting his right to demand leases and annual quitrents on all settled lands. The local inhabitants and the town councils unanimously rejected his claims, arguing that their purchases from Native Americans, decades of clearance and labor, and general quiet possession superseded decades-old patents. Meeting severe resistance from Richard Waldron and Richard Martyn, Mason returned to England in 1681 to petition the Crown for stronger executive intervention.

=== Cranfield administration ===
In 1682, Mason persuaded the Crown to appoint Edward Cranfield as lieutenant governor of New Hampshire. Before Cranfield sailed, Mason entered into a financial agreement with him, mortgaging his prospective colonial quitrents to guarantee Cranfield a substantial annual income of £150.

Upon his arrival, Cranfield suspended opposing council members and reconstituted the provincial courts with judges and jurors favorable to Mason's interests. Mason initiated dozens of suits for ejectment and trespass against prominent landowners, including William Vaughan and Richard Waldron, obtaining judgments in his favor in nearly every case.

High tensions in New Hampshire led to unrest such as the brief Gove's Rebellion in 1683. Unable to collect either Mason's revenues or royal taxes, Cranfield found his authority broken and departed the colony in 1685. After Cranfield's departure, Walter Barefoote succeeded him and attempted to enfore Mason's claims. The settlers responded with concerted nonviolent resistance and active defiance. Marshals attempting to seize cattle or property under executions were confronted by armed mobs, threatened with hot water, and denied provisions. When properties were offered at public auction, no buyers could be found.

== Dominion of New England and death ==
In 1686, King James II consolidated the northern colonies into the Dominion of New England, under the governorship of Sir Edmund Andros. New Hampshire was incorporated into the centralized dominion, and Robert Tufton Mason was appointed to Andros's council, taking his seat in Boston in December 1686.

During Andros's governance, all existing New England land titles were declared void unless confirmed by the Crown through new patents and quitrent, a policy consistent with Mason's longstanding principles. Mason accompanied Andros on tours across New England and New York.

In the late summer of 1688, while accompanying Governor Andros on an administrative journey along the Hudson River, Mason fell ill. He died on 6 September 1688 at Esopus (present-day Kingston, New York), at approximately 53 years of age.

== Legacy and sale of patent ==
Mason was survived by two sons, John and Robert Tufton Mason. Confronted by mounting legal debts and entrenched resistance from New Hampshire settlers, the heirs decided to liquidate their inheritance. In April 1691, the brothers sold their entire proprietary right in New Hampshire to Samuel Allen, a London merchant who subsequently obtained appointment as governor of the province.

Allen's efforts to collect rents and enforce the patent proved equally unsuccessful and spawned several more decades of litigation. In January 1746, Robert Tufton Mason's great-grandson, John Tufton Mason, after legally breaking the entail on the original grants, sold the family's remaining claim for £1,500 to a syndicate of twelve Portsmouth gentlemen who came to be known as the Masonian Proprietors. The Proprietors subsequently confirmed the existing titles of settled towns without demanding back rents, finally ending over a century of proprietary land contention in the province.

The Mason land claims directly contribute to the ongoing Piscataqua River border dispute between New Hampshire and Maine.

== See also ==
- Province of New Hampshire
- John Mason (governor)
- Edward Cranfield
- Edward Randolph (colonial administrator)
- Dominion of New England
