= Henry Josselyn =

Settler in New England

Coat of Arms of Henry Josselyn

Henry Josselyn (also spelled Jocelyn; died ca. 1683) was an early settler of northern New England. He was first retained by John Mason, the proprietor of the territory that later became New Hampshire, to administer his holdings. Arriving at the Piscataqua River in 1634, he administered Mason's settlement (roughly including present-day Portsmouth and some nearby communities) until Mason's death in 1635. (In some New Hampshire histories he is styled as "governor" of the Mason properties). He thereafter moved further up the coast, settling in what is now Scarborough, Maine. He briefly acted as deputy governor of the Province of Maine in the colonial administration of Thomas Gorges, before the area came under the control of the Massachusetts Bay Colony. He was opposed to Massachusetts rule, and was arrested on one occasion for his resistance. When the area was granted to James, Duke of York in 1664, it became part of the Province of New York, and Josselyn was appointed a magistrate by the Carr-Cartwright Commission.

There is no record of his death; a letter date May 10, 1683 mentions his passing.

Government offices
| Preceded by Walter Neale | Governor of the Lower Plantations of New Hampshire; 1634–1638 | Succeeded by Francis Norton |
