= George Burdett (governor) =

George Burdett (c. 1602–1671) was the second colonial governor of the Upper Plantation of New Hampshire, later to become the Province of New Hampshire, between 1637 and 1640. He returned to England and was a chaplain to Parliamentary regiments during the English Civil War. After the Restoration he served as a minister in Ireland.

== Biography ==
George Burdett was born in England, Burdett was a minister of the Church of England serving at Yarmouth. Under the pretence of being oppressed by a fellow bishop, but in reality because he had been suspended for disrespecting a statue of Jesus, he left his life and children and travelled to New England in 1636. Burdett spent a short time in Salem, Massachusetts before travelling to Dover, New Hampshire where his popularity led to his election as governor within a year. His ministry was characterised by the dispute between Episcopalian and Puritan settlers, resulting in "confusion and trouble."

Burdett corresponded with Archbishop William Laud, and when this was discovered by his political opponents, he was forced from office. Following an adulterous revelation, he left for Agamenticus (present-day York, Maine), however he fell into "usurpation, crime and injustice". According to State Papers from Maine, he was "indicted by the whole Bench for a man of ill name and fame." He was charged with committing adultery with two married women and ordered to pay compensation. As a result, he returned to England, where he served as chaplain to Parliamentary regiments during the English Civil War. After the Restoration he served as a minister in Ireland.

== Notes ==
Government offices
Preceded by Thomas Wiggin	Governor of the Upper Plantations of New Hampshire; 1637–1641	Succeeded by Thomas Dudley as Governor of Massachusetts Bay Colony
