= Walter Neale =

English military officer (fl. 1618–1639)

Walter Neale (fl. 1618–1639) was an English military officer and an explorer and colonial administrator in the territory of New England that later became New Hampshire.

Born into a family that had served Queen Elizabeth I, Neale served in military campaigns in Europe from 1618 until about 1625. In 1629 he was hired by Sir Ferdinando Gorges and Captain John Mason. Gorges and Mason, who between them claimed most of the territory north of the mouth of the Merrimack River, formed the Laconia Company to explore the interior, and they hired Neale to do this exploration, as well as to administer Mason's "lower" plantations on the Piscataqua River (on the coastline of present-day New Hampshire).

In 1630 Neale arrived at Piscataqua. His administration of the lower plantations was marred by boundary disagreements with Thomas Wiggin, who administered the upper plantations on the river. He led exploratory expeditions as far as the White Mountains in the interior of New Hampshire, but never located the "Lake of the Iroquois" that his employers believed to exist. He returned to England in 1633; the Laconia Company venture failed.

In 1634 King Charles I gave him command of the artillery park in London, and he was soon after appointed muster master of the city militia. He sought but did not obtain a military post in the Colony of Virginia. His last known posting is as lieutenant governor of Plymouth in 1639.

Government offices
New office	Governor of the Lower Plantations of New Hampshire; 1630–1633	Succeeded by Francis Williams or Henry Josselyn
