= Royal Commission of 1664 =

1664 English colonial mission to America

The Royal Commission of 1664 (also known as the Nicolls Commission or the Carr-Cartwright Commission) was a delegation of four men dispatched to North America by King Charles II to undertake a survey of the northern colonies and settle some of the Crown's most pressing concerns.

Composed of Colonel Richard Nicolls, Sir Robert Carr, George Cartwright, and Samuel Maverick, the commission was tasked with capturing the Dutch colony of New Netherland, settling inter-colonial boundary disputes, enforcing the Navigation Acts, and asserting royal authority over the increasingly autonomous New England colonies.

It was the Crown's first attempt to assert control over its North American colonies.

== Background ==
Following the Restoration in 1660, King Charles II and his Lord Chancellor, Edward Hyde, 1st Earl of Clarendon, sought to consolidate imperial control over the American colonies. The Puritan colonies of New England, which had largely governed themselves without royal interference during the English Civil War and the Interregnum and who had actively harbored the Regicides, were viewed with suspicion by the Crown. Furthermore, the Dutch presence in New Netherland created a wedge between the English Chesapeake colonies and New England, complicating the enforcement of English trade monopolies.

On April 25, 1664, Charles II issued a formal patent appointing the four commissioners. They were granted sweeping executive and appellate judicial powers to "hear and determine all complaints and appeals in all causes and matters, as well military as criminal and civil," effectively overriding local colonial charters.

== Conquest of New Netherland ==
The commissioners arrived in Boston in July 1664, but quickly proceeded to the primary military objective: the reduction of New Netherland. In August, Nicolls anchored a small fleet of English frigates off the coast of New Amsterdam. They were assisted by militia from Long Island and forces under John Winthrop Jr., Governor of Connecticut. Despite the initial defiance of Dutch Director-General Peter Stuyvesant, the lack of fortifications and popular support forced the Dutch to surrender on September 8, 1664. The territory was reorganized as the Province of New York, and Nicolls remained behind as its governor.

=== The Subjugation of the Delaware (New Amstel) ===
Following the capture of New Amsterdam, Nicolls divided his forces to secure the rest of the New Netherland territory. In September 1664, he dispatched Sir Robert Carr south with a naval force to the Delaware River to demand the surrender of the Dutch and Swedish settlements there. When the Dutch commander at Fort Casimir in New Amstel refused to surrender immediately, Carr attacked. Violating Nicolls' preference for a peaceful, diplomatic transition, Carr fired two broadsides into the fort and took it by storm.

Carr behaved ruthlessly after the conquest. He plundered the settlement, sold captured Dutch soldiers into slavery in Virginia, and expropriated the best local estates for himself and his officers. Carr renamed the town New Castle. Nicolls was outraged by Carr's violence and self-dealing, forcing Nicolls to personally travel to the Delaware to rein in Carr and return some of the confiscated property.

== Travels in New England ==
With New York secured, Carr, Cartwright, and Maverick toured New England to fulfill the diplomatic and administrative requirements of their commission, receiving drastically different receptions depending on the colony.

=== Favorable Reception in Connecticut and Rhode Island ===
Unlike the hostilities they would face in Boston, the commissioners were warmly welcomed in Connecticut and Rhode Island. Both of these smaller colonies possessed newer royal charters (granted in 1662 and 1663, respectively) and relied on the Crown to protect them from the aggressive territorial ambitions of the Massachusetts Bay Colony.

In Rhode Island, Governor Benedict Arnold and the colonial assembly received the King's letters from the commissioners with "great and wonderful favour," viewing royal intervention as a shield against their Puritan neighbors.

In Connecticut, Governor John Winthrop Jr. actively cooperated with the commissioners, helping them draw official boundary lines between New York and Connecticut, and willingly agreeing to the commissioners' demands to permit freedom of worship for Anglicans and non-Puritans.

==== Settlement of the Narragansett Country (The King’s Province) ====
One of the most complex tasks handed to the commissioners was resolving the decades-long, bitter dispute over the Narragansett Country in southwestern Rhode Island. Three colonies disputed the territory. The first was Connecticut, which claimed its 1662 royal charter set its eastern boundary at the Narragansett Bay. The second was Rhode Island, which claimed its 1663 charter granted it the territory as far west as the Pawcatuck River. The third was Massachusetts Bay, which had unilaterally claimed parts of the territory and had incorporated the town of Southerton based on dormant rights from the Pequot War of 1637.

On April 8, 1665, the royal commissioners intervened with a sweeping executive order which dismissed the claims of Massachusetts Bay and put Connecticut’s active claim into abeyance, pushing its jurisdiction back to the Pawcatuck River.

To settle the immediate constitutional gridlock, the commissioners took the contested land directly into the Crown's possession, renaming the Narragansett Country "The King's Province"

In a victory for Rhode Island, the commissioners placed the administration of the newly formed King's Province under the temporary jurisdiction of Rhode Island’s magistrates, who were appointed as royal Justices of the Peace to govern the area.

Although Connecticut would continue to contest the decision for decades, including in a 1683 commission which included Edward Cranfield and Edward Randolph, the boundaries established by the 1664 commission laid the foundation for the permanent borders agreed upon by both colonies in 1703

=== Resistance in Massachusetts Bay ===
The commissioners met fierce resistance in the Massachusetts Bay Colony. The General Court of Massachusetts viewed the commissioners' appellate powers as an existential threat to the Massachusetts Charter of 1629. The colony formally refused to recognize the commissioners' judicial authority, declaring that submitting to royal appeals was inconsistent with their charter rights and their "civil and religious liberties."

When the commissioners attempted to hold a court in Boston to hear grievances against the local magistrates, the Massachusetts government publicly proclaimed by sound of trumpet that no citizen should submit to the commission's authority. Frustrated, Cartwright and Carr wrote to the Secretary of State, Lord Arlington, documenting the "rebellious" nature of the colony, noting that Massachusetts felt they were "not obliged to the King, but by civility.

==== Intervention in New Hampshire ====
Seeking to isolate Massachusetts, the commission sought to sever the northern settlements from Massachusetts' jurisdiction. In 1665, the commissioners traveled to Portsmouth and actively encouraged the inhabitants to petition the King for separation from Massachusetts. They set up royal governments in the northern territories, though Massachusetts actively undermined these efforts once the commissioners departed.

==== Royal Authority in Maine ====
The commissioners took their most direct administrative action in the Province of Maine. Massachusetts had controversially annexed Maine in 1652, overriding the proprietary claims of the heirs of Sir Ferdinando Gorges. In the summer of 1665, Carr, Cartwright, and Maverick arrived in Maine and officially stripped Massachusetts of its jurisdiction over the territory.

Acting on royal authority, they established a direct royal government, appointing local magistrates and naming Henry Josselyn as the President of the Province of Maine. This successfully removed Maine from Massachusetts Puritan control for several years. However, this royal victory was short-lived; by May 1668, after the commissioners had returned to England, Massachusetts sent armed magistrates, including John Leverett and Richard Waldron, back into Maine and forcibly dismantled the commissioners' government, reasserting Boston's control.

== Legacy ==
The Royal Commission of 1664 marked the end of England's "salutary neglect" and the beginning of active imperial administration in North America. While it succeeded in eliminating the Dutch empire from the eastern seaboard and establishing peace between Connecticut and Rhode Island, its failure to subdue Massachusetts highlighted the constitutional friction between colonial self-rule and royal prerogative. The reports generated by the commissioners would have provided the legal and political ammunition that the Crown could use to revoke the Massachusetts charter.

However, the official reports did not make it back to the Crown. Richard Nicolls remained in North America as the Governor of New York until 1668 and did not report to the king. Having no desire to return to Puritan-dominated Massachusetts or England, Maverick was granted a house in New York by the Duke of York as a reward for his loyalty and remained there. Sir Robert Carr departed America in 1667 but died in Bristol, England, almost immediately after stepping ashore, before he could formally report to the King. On his voyage back to England in 1665, Cartwright's ship was captured by a Dutch privateer. He was stripped of his possessions, and crucially, lost all the original official papers, treaties, and detailed reports the commission had gathered in New England. He eventually made it back to London and was forced to testify from memory.

The loss of the formal report meant that the information would have to be regathered. In 1676, the king sent Edward Randolph on a fact finding mission to ascertain similar information as the Nicolls Commission. Randolph's report, along with reports from Edward Cranfield, would be used to justify further Crown involvement in the colonies and in 1684 the Crown would establish the centralized Dominion of New England.
