= Thomas Wiggin =

First governor of the Upper Plantation of New Hampshire

1st Upper plantation governor
- In office c.1633–1637
- Succeeded by: George Burdett

Personal details
- Born: 1601; Bishops Itchington, Warwickshire, England
- Died: 1666 (aged 64–65); Stratham, Rockingham, New Hampshire
- Spouse: (2) Katherine Whiting
- Known for: First governor of the Upper Plantation of New Hampshire

Captain Thomas Wiggin (1601–1666), often known as Governor Thomas Wiggin, was the first governor of the Upper Plantation of New Hampshire, a settlement that later became part of the Province of New Hampshire in 1679. He was the founder of Stratham, Rockingham, New Hampshire, which celebrated its 300th anniversary of incorporation in 2016. He was the son of a vicar in the Church of England with family ties to important and influential families of the era, and a highly respected man in his own right who left his stamp on what would become American values.

== Biography ==
Wiggin first appears in colonial records as a signatory to the Wheelwright Deed in May 1629. This document, which some historians, in response to the American Civil War, have claimed is a forgery, lays out an alliance with the sagamores of the Algonquins for mutual defense and to transfer land along the seacoast of present-day New Hampshire from the local Indians to a group of English colonists led by Reverend John Wheelwright.

Wiggin arrived in New England on the Winthrop Fleet. By 1631, he had been appointed by the proprietors of the "Upper" or "Dover" Plantation (comprising modern-day Dover, Durham and Stratham) to be their chief agent or governor. He settled in what is now Stratham. He was also the holder of the large Squamscott patent, covering land east of the mouth of the Squamscott River, and was a close ally of Governor John Winthrop of the neighboring Massachusetts Bay Colony.

In 1632, Wiggin traveled to England, and returned the following year with expanded powers and 30 Puritan settlers. Wiggin acted as governor of the plantation until its inhabitants established a more formal government in 1637 and elected George Burdett as governor. During this time, the Dover plantation was divided along religious lines, with the 1633 Puritan arrivals disagreeing with the early Anglican settlers.

When Massachusetts authorities asserted territorial claims over the New Hampshire plantations in the early 1640s, Wiggin represented them in the colonial assembly, and eventually rose to become a member of the Massachusetts council of assistants.

Wiggin was a Puritan and extremely religious. He ascribed fervently to the belief that the Anglican Church had to be cleansed of Catholic theology and ritual. He was convinced that God would punish England for its heresy, and believed that English Puritans needed to create a New England in a new world.

Three of Wiggin's children survived to adulthood: Andrew, Mary and Thomas. In June 1659, his son Andrew married Hannah Bradstreet, daughter of Massachusetts Governor Simon Bradstreet and Anne Dudley (daughter of Massachusetts Governor Thomas Dudley). Wiggin's son Thomas (born c. 1640) married Sarah, sister of Walter Barefoote.

== Sources ==
- Lewis Company. Genealogical and Family History of New Hampshire, Volume 3

Government offices
New office	Governor of the Upper Plantations of New Hampshire; 1633?–1637	Succeeded by George Burdett
