= Thomas Danforth =

17th-century Massachusetts Bay Colony magistrate and politician

Deputy Governor of the Massachusetts Bay Colony
- In office 1679–1686
- Preceded by: Simon Bradstreet
- Succeeded by: William Stoughton (as deputy president of the Dominion of New England)
- In office 1689–1692
- Preceded by: Francis Nicholson (as lieutenant governor of the Dominion of New England)
- Succeeded by: William Stoughton (as lieutenant governor of the Province of Massachusetts Bay)

Personal details
- Born: bapt. November 20, 1623 Framlingham, Suffolk, England
- Died: November 5, 1699 (aged 76) Province of Massachusetts Bay
- Profession: Magistrate

Thomas Danforth (baptized November 20, 1623 – November 5, 1699) was a politician, magistrate, and landowner in the Massachusetts Bay Colony. A conservative Puritan, he served for many years as one of the colony's councilors and magistrates, generally leading opposition to attempts by the English kings to assert control over the colony.

He accumulated land in the central part of the colony that eventually became a portion of Framingham, Massachusetts. His government roles included administration of territory in present-day Maine that was purchased by the colony.

Danforth was a magistrate and leading figure in the colony at the time of the Salem witch trials, but did not sit on the Court of Oyer and Terminer. Despite this, he is inaccurately depicted in Arthur Miller's 1953 play The Crucible and its movie adaptations as doing so. In reality, Danforth is recorded as being critical of the conduct of the trials, and played a role in bringing them to an end.

== Early life ==
Thomas Danforth was born in Framlingham, Suffolk, England, and baptized on November 20, 1623. He was the eldest son of Nicholas Danforth (1589–1638) and Elizabeth Symmes (1596–1629). Danforth immigrated with his father, brothers Samuel and Jonathan, and sisters Anna, Elizabeth, and Lydia to New England in 1634, probably aboard the Griffin.

The family, along with the 200 or so other passengers aboard, left England to escape persecution for their Puritan beliefs. William Laud had become archbishop of the Church of England in 1633 and begun a crackdown on Nonconformist religious practices (such as those practiced by the more Calvinist Puritans) that prompted a wave of migration to the New World.

== Public service ==
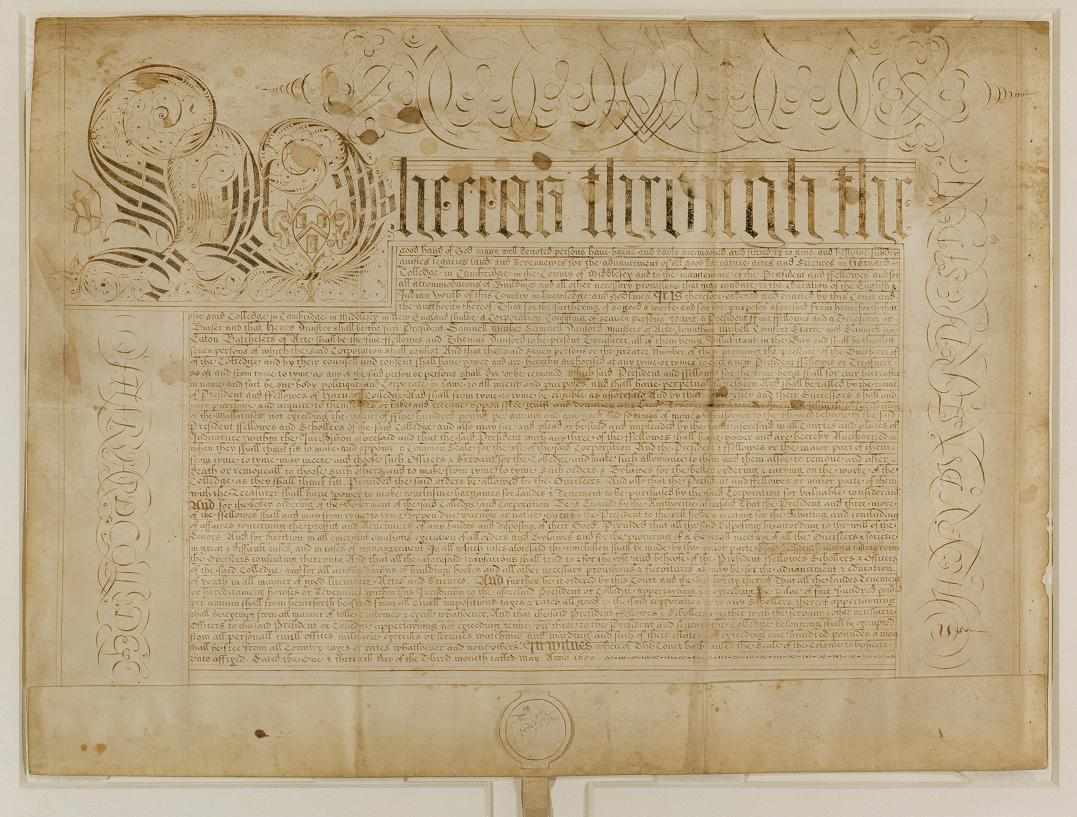
The original charter of Harvard College

Soon after his arrival in the Massachusetts Bay Colony Nicholas Danforth acquired property in Cambridge, becoming one of the town's leading citizens and a member of the colony's general court (as its assembly was known).In 1643 Danforth was admitted a freeman of the colony, which conferred on him the right to vote and to participate in the colony's political affairs.

He was appointed Treasurer of Harvard College in its charter of 1650, and served as a steward of the college from 1669 to 1682. From 1659 he sat on the colony's council of assistants, and was elected deputy governor in 1679. In 1665 Danforth was member of a commission that oversaw the extension of Massachusetts colonial authority over the territories of what is now southern Maine, which colonial surveyors had determined to fall within its borders.

Danforth's politics and religion were relatively conservative, with one historian describing him as "the Pym of Massachusetts politics". In 1661 the colony was rebuked by King Charles II for its mistreatment of Quakers; the colonial government had banned Quakers from its territory under threat of death, and four of them had recently been hanged after repeatedly violating the ban. The king in his letter demanded that the colony allow Quakers and others freedom of religious expression.

Danforth was one member of a committee that was established to formulate a response. The document the committee drafted was a conservative declaration that the colonial government was essentially sovereign except where its laws conflicted with English law. (By the time the king's letter arrived the colonial government had already lessened the harsh punishments for violating bans.) Two committee members, magistrate Simon Bradstreet and minister John Norton, were sent to England to argue the colony's case.

When King Philip's War broke out in 1675 (pitting many Native American tribes of southern New England against English colonists), Danforth was involved in some of the events of the war. Many colonists distrusted the Praying Indians (Christianized Indians living peacefully in communities on the outskirts of English towns), some of whom were attacked by mobs of English settlers seeking revenge for attacks on their communities. Danforth, along with Daniel Gookin and the Indian missionary Reverend John Eliot, was a vocal supporter of the Praying Indians, and worked to prevent some of these excesses, at some personal risk. In one notable instance Danforth was aboard a small boat with other colonial officials in Boston Harbor en route to Long Island to inspect facilities for Praying Indians who had been relocated there "for their own safety" when a nearby ship apparently intentionally rammed the smaller vessel. No one was injured in the incident, but all of the older officials were dunked in the cold waters of the harbor.

In 1680 Danforth was chosen president in the District of Maine by the Massachusetts assembly. The colony had previously governed this territory (roughly the land between the Piscataqua and Kennebec Rivers in what is now southwestern Maine), but its right to do so had been stripped by King Charles after protests by the heirs of Sir Ferdinando Gorges, who had long-standing claims to the area. Agents for Massachusetts then purchased the territory from the Gorges heirs, and Danforth was appointed to administer it. The territory had been devastated and many properties abandoned during King Philip's War, and Danforth acted in effect as a Lord Proprietor, making land grants and reestablishing towns such as Falmouth and North Yarmouth. Danforth was rewarded by the colony with a grant of an island in Casco Bay for this work, which he oversaw until 1686.

Throughout the 1670s, the Massachusetts leadership steadfastly refused to make changes to its administration that were demanded by King Charles. At the instigation of agent Edward Randolph, Charles made increasingly specific demands concerning freedom of religion and adherence to colonial trade regulations known as the Navigation Acts, and prepared to issue a quo warranto writ to demand the return of the colonial charter. Danforth was one of the leading opponents to making any accommodation to the king's demands.

The issue reached a peak in the 1684 election, in which Danforth stood for election as governor representing the hardline party. He was narrowly defeated by the more conciliatory Simon Bradstreet, but retained the post of deputy governor. The colony's attempts at moderation were in vain—the charter was formally annulled on June 18, 1684.

In 1686 King James II established the Dominion of New England as a new colonial entity to govern all of New England. He appointed Massachusetts native Joseph Dudley as its first governor; he was replaced later that year by Sir Edmund Andros. Both Dudley and Andros excluded Danforth from their councils, given his opposition to crown authority. The dominion reign, which did not include an elected assembly, was extremely unpopular in Massachusetts for a variety of reasons. When the Glorious Revolution deposed James, Massachusetts Puritan leaders orchestrated an uprising and arrested Andros, Dudley, and other dominion officials. In the period between the dominion's collapse and the establishment of the Province of Massachusetts Bay in 1692, the old colonial government was temporarily reestablished, and Danforth resumed his offices.

=== Salem trials ===
In 1692, Danforth was acting governor during the early months of the witch hysteria in Salem and his name appears once in the Salem court records as part of a council which observed the proceedings on April 11. but his involvement ended in May upon the arrival of Sir William Phips, the first royal governor under the new charter of the Province of Massachusetts Bay. Danforth was not assigned to the special Court of Oyer and Terminer that Phips established shortly thereafter, and he was opposed to the manner in which magistrate William Stoughton conducted the witch trials, which unconditionally accepted spectral evidence in its proceedings and vigorously presumed the guilt of the accused. In a letter by Thomas Brattle on October 8, 1692, Danforth is described as among a select group of "several about the Bay, men for understanding, judgement and piety... that do utterly condemn the said proceedings, and do freely deliver their judgment..."

After the Court of Oyer and Terminer stopped sitting, a new Superior Court was created, and, in December 1692, Stoughton was elected by the governor's council to head the court, defeating Danforth by three votes.

In the beginning of 1693, Danforth participated in Superior Court sessions overseen by Stoughton, which heard witchcraft cases. However, these sessions no longer considered spectral evidence as valid. When Stoughton temporarily removed himself to protest Governor Phips' ban on spectral evidence and other related reforms, Danforth sometimes presided over the court.

Danforth was known to be sympathetic to the plight of individuals accused, relocating some of them to his lands west of Boston in Framingham.

Sarah Cloyce, a woman accused during the Salem witch trials, relocated with her husband to a property owned by Danforth and settled into a house on Salem End Road constructed in 1693. In 1992, The Boston Globe published a historian's suggestion that Danforth might have facilitated Cloyce's escape from Ipswich jail and subsequently concealed her family on his property.

== Death ==
He died in 1699, leaving his lands and the care of his younger children to Thomas.

== Family and property ==
Danforth married Mary Withington in 1644. The couple had 12 children, but half of these died before the age of three. Danforth was survived by only three of the others. Danforth died in Cambridge on November 5, 1699. During his lifetime, Danforth owned an enslaved man named Philip Ffeild.

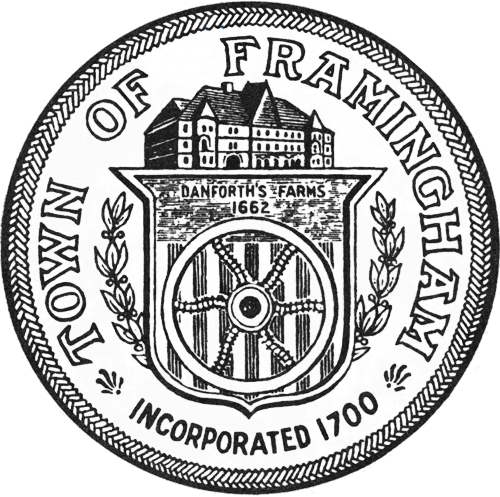
The seal of Framingham, Massachusetts; the words "Danforth's Farms" are visible near the top of the shield.

In 1662 Danforth began to acquire land to the west of Boston by way of land grants by the Great and General Court after general surveys conducted by Edmund Rice at the behest of the Court. Originally known as "Danforth's Farm", he began to refer to the estate as "Framingham" in the 1670s in honor of his birthplace. Although Danforth continued to reside in Cambridge, he developed these lands, which came to number 15,000 acres (61 km^{2}), by issuing 999 year leases rather than selling parcels. By the 1690s a number of somewhat discontiguous communities existed on the land, which petitioned the state for incorporation. Objections were made to the earliest petition (of 1692) by Danforth, since it did not include all of his lands, and a number of subsequent petitions were objected to by neighboring communities. It was not until 1700, after Danforth had died, that the town of Framingham was granted a charter. The town's seal contains the words "Danforth's Farms" in commemoration of this heritage.

Danforth, Maine is named in his honor. The Danforth Art Museum, founded in 1975, is located in Framingham.

== Legacy ==
Danforth Street, in Portland, Maine, is now named for him.

== Fictional character in The Crucible ==
In Arthur Miller's 1953 play The Crucible, Thomas Danforth is depicted as the leading judicial figure overseeing the Salem trials. William Stoughton is not a character in the play, and Miller portrays Danforth as an honest but domineering and selfish judge, under whose authority many are imprisoned and sentenced to hang. When John Proctor, an accused, defies his authority at the end of the play by refusing to lie and sign a public confession saying that he is a wizard and accusing others, he is mercilessly sentenced to hang.

In an introduction to the play, Miller wrote that he had combined several persons and made other changes to the historical characters for dramatic purposes.

Miller also wrote the screenplay for the 1996 film version of the play, in which the name Danforth was retained (portrayed by actor Paul Scofield) as the principal judicial antagonist. In the 1957 film adaptation of the play, whose screenplay was written by Jean-Paul Sartre, Danforth (portrayed by Raymond Rouleau, who also directed the picture) is portrayed the same way.

== Bibliography ==
- Abbotson, Susa n (2007). Critical Companion to Arthur Miller. New York: Facts on File. ISBN 9781438108384. OCLC 234190813.
- Adams, Brooks (1886). The Emancipation of Massachusetts. Boston: Houghton, Mifflin. OCLC 1015603.
- Adams, James Truslow (2001) [1921]. The Founding of New England. Safety Harbor, FL: Simon Publications. ISBN 9781931313506. OCLC 51579404.
- Bloom, Harold (2008). Arthur Miller's The Crucible. ISBN 978-0-7910-9828-8.
- Wilson, J. G.; Fiske, J., eds. (1888). "Danforth, Thomas". Appletons' Cyclopædia of American Biography. New York: D. Appleton.
- Doyle, John Andrew (1889). English Colonies in America. New York: Henry Holt. OCLC 2453886.
- Drake, Samuel Gardner (1856). The history & antiquities of Boston : from its settlement in 1630, to the year 1770. Boston : Luther Stevens.
- Harris, William Thaddeus (1853). "Notes on the Danforth Family". New England Historical and Genealogical Register.
- Hill, Frances (2000). The Salem Witch Trials Reader. Cambridge, MA: Da Capo Press. ISBN 9780306809460. OCLC 247412768.
- Hurd, Duane (1890). History of Middlesex County, Volume 2. Philadelphia, PA: J. W. Lewis & Co. OCLC 2155461.
- Labaree, Benjamin (1979). Colonial Massachusetts: a History. Millwood, NY: KTO Press. ISBN 978-0-527-18714-9. OCLC 248194957.
- Martin, John Frederick (1991). Profits in the Wilderness: Entrepreneurship and the Founding of New England Towns in the Seventeenth Century. Chapel Hill, NC: University of North Carolina Press. ISBN 9780807820018. OCLC 231347624.
- May, John Joseph (1902). Danforth Genealogy. Boston, MA: Charles Pope. OCLC 1668736.
- Mayo, Lawrence Shaw (1936). John Endecott. Cambridge, MA: Harvard University Press. OCLC 1601746.
- Parr, James; Swope, Kevin (2009). Framingham Legends & Lore. Charleston, SC: History Press. ISBN 978-1-59629-565-0. OCLC 259754352.
- Pulsipher, Jenny Hale (2007). Subjects Unto The Same King: Indians, English, and the Contest for Authority in Colonial New England. Philadelphia, PA: University of Pennsylvania Press. ISBN 9780812219081. OCLC 123500885.
- York Deeds, Volume 3. Portland, ME: Maine Historical Society. 1888. OCLC 17914452.

Political offices
Preceded by Simon Bradstreet	Deputy Governor of the Massachusetts Bay Colony; 1679–1686	Succeeded by William Stoughton as Deputy President of the Dominion of New England
Preceded by Francis Nicholson as Lieutenant Governor of the Dominion of New England	Deputy Governor of the Massachusetts Bay Colony; 1689–1692	Succeeded by William Stoughton as Lieutenant Governor of the Province of Massachusetts Bay
Legal offices
New seat	Associate Justice of the Massachusetts Superior Court of Judicature; 1692–1699	Succeeded by John Walley
