= Edward Cranfield =

English colonial official

Governor of New Hampshire
- In office 1682–1685
- Preceded by: Richard Waldron
- Succeeded by: Walter Barefoote (acting)

Commissioner of Customs for Barbados
- In office 1687–1699

Personal details
- Born: c.1649 Christ Church, Barbados?
- Died: November 5, 1700 Bath, Somerset, England
- Spouse: Mary
- Children: Elizabeth

Edward Cranfield (fl. 1673–5 November 1700) was an English colonial administrator. He held several posts throughout the British West Indies, but is most remembered as the Governor of New Hampshire.

== Early life ==
His early life is difficult to determine due to several historical Edward Cranfields with connections to both Barbados and the British Government.

Belknap's History of New Hampshire contains a footnote claiming Cranfield was "of the family of Lord Monteagle, who was instrumental of discovering the popish plot in the reign of James I.

That would make Edward Cranfield the son of Edward Cranfield and Elizabeth Parker. It is the Parker line who is descended from Lord Monteagle.

His father died in Barbados in 1649. He is not mentioned in his father's 1649 will, but his older brothers Francis and William are.

On 3 May 1662, Cranfield sold 360 acres of land in Christ Church, Barbados to Nathaniel Kingsland in exchange for an unknown amount of sugar. A stipulation associated with the sale suggests that Cranfield owed Kingsland £150 and 9,000 lbs of sugar.

In 1663, an Edward Cranfield was the plaintiff of a suite against Lord Morley. This further suggests a connection between this Cranfield and the Morley/Monteagle line.

=== Confirmed Details ===
He was appointed an Assistant Gentleman Usher of King Charles II on 19 September 1671. Around six months later he was appointed a full usher on 9 March 1672.

He managed to leverage that position to receive an appointment to the office of Escheater of Barbados in January 1673. This was a land office that managed property ownership in which the owner died without an heir. The concept is known as escheat.

It is unclear if he ever entered the position because in July 1674, he was appointed to be one of the Commissioners to Willoughbyland. It is unclear because Cranfield was in England when he was appointed a commissioner, suggesting that he hadn’t left for Barbados.

== Commissioner to Suriname ==
After the Treaty of Westminster ended the Third Anglo-Dutch War in 1674, Cranfield was selected to be a Commissioner to Suriname take account of the condition of the English inhabitants and adjust all matters concerning their departure thence according to the 5th Article of the late treaty. Also selected was Ferdinand Gorges, grandson of Ferdinand Gorges. It could be speculated that Cranfield first learned about the Gorges-Mason land claims in New England then.

While planning the trip to Surinam and making preparations for the evacuation of British subjects and their property, Cranfield had the idea to bring barrels of salt in case the inhabitants wanted to slaughter their cows rather than transport them alive. This caused a flurry of letters amongst the Admiralty, but eventually they agreed with him.

Edward Cranfield, Richard Dickinson, and Mark Brent arrived in Suriname around June 1675. Ferdinand Gorges had to drop out and was replaced by Brent. By December of that year, they had dropped off 250 whites and 981 slaves from Suriname to Jamaica. The first ship arrived in Jamaica on September 1 with 40 families and on September 8th, the American and the Hercules arrived with the remainder. The refugees were settled in Westmoreland Parish, which for a time became known as Surinam Quarters. As lead commissioner, Cranfield brought charges against a James Davis for violating three of the terms of evacuation; one of them was passing off three free Indians as Davis' slaves.

While in Jamaica, Cranfield appeared to not get along with Governor John Vaughan, 3rd Earl of Carbery. The latter wrote a letter to Secretary of State Joseph Williamson, among other things, complaining that Cranfield has appeared very indiscreet, caballed with discontented people, bragged about his commissions, spoke imprudently of Ministers at Court, and avoided meeting him. Worst, Cranfield did not thank the governor when he was given the best berthing on a ship to carry out his commission. However, a May 1676 copy of meeting minutes from the Board of Trade reports that Cranfield had acquitted himself very well and should not want marks of royal favour.

=== Survey of the Colonies ===
Cranfield's commission included a second part which he was to do after dropping of the evacuees from Suriname. He was to travel around the colonies to understand the value of plantations and of the taxes, trades, oppressions, hazards, and profits, legal or illegal under the several Governments, and particularly as dexterously as he could satisfy himself in the following particulars. Then follow 22 standard inquiries, being those usually sent by the Council of Plantations to Governors of same, and in particular as to New England. Among the questions to answer in New England was whether the Book of Common Prayer was used.

== Governor of New Hampshire ==
In the early 1680s, Robert Tufton Mason persuaded King Charles II to appoint a royal governor who would enforce his claims against the New Hampshire settlers. Mason promised the king one fifth of the quit-rents in exchange for appointing a favorable governor.

Cranfield was thus appointed governor of the Province of New Hampshire from 1682 to 1685. Although he was the third governor of the province, he was the first governor to be appointed by the king who was not an original settler and he was the first governor who moved to New Hampshire for the purpose of taking office and he was the first governor as the title and with the powers of chief executive and of commander-in-chief. Previously, the militia had reported to the deputy of the royal council rather than the president. His administration was marked by hostility between himself and the colonists. His royal commission was one of the most powerful to date with the power to "...to call, adjourn, prorogue and dissolve general courts; to have a negative voice in all acts of government; to suspend any of the council when he should see just cause (and every counselor so suspended was declared incapable of being elected into the general assembly) to appoint a deputy-governor, judges, justices, and other officers, by his sole authority..."

When he arrived in Portsmouth on October 3, 1682, he promptly fired Richard Waldron and Richard Martin from the governor's council. They were two of the most prominent landowners in New Hampshire and opponents of Mason and replaced them with loyalists Walter Barefoote and Richard Chamberlain.

When the New Hampshire Assembly met in November 1682, they attempted to bribe Cranfield with 250 pounds. He accepted the bribe and restored Waldron and Martin to their previous positions.

Of minor note, the only surviving copy of the "Combination of the People of Dover to Establish a Form of Government" was made by him in 1682 and sent to London.

=== Gove's Rebellion ===
When Cranfield heard that Edward Gove had started a rebellion, he activated the entire provincial militia to assemble to stop it. He was about to ride to the rally point when he received word that the Hampton militia had arrested Gove. After the latter's trial, Gove was sent to England aboard the ship Richard.. In the aftermath of Gove's Rebellion, King James II dismissed Cranfield.

== Career in Barbados ==
Cranfield left New Hampshire in 1685 for Jamaica, where he was spent a few months before returning to England. While there, he spend some time recovering at the baths in Bath, England and he managed to secure a new position back in the West Indies. He was appointed a member of the Council of Barbados in February 1687 and was sworn in by May 1687. He served under Governor Edwin Stede and the four subsequent governors.

In 1693, he was appointed the Naval Officer of Barbados by Governor Francis Russell. His duties included coordinating the naval needs of the island, requesting ships from the Admiralty, overseeing the island's fortifications, and planning operations against pirates

At some point he was appointed the Commissioner of Customs in which role he enforced an unpopular 4.5% tax on sugar exports. In a similar way to when he was governor of New Hampshire, he used official office for personal gain. In June 1696, the Council of Barbados received a petition from inhabitants and ship owners detailing complaints about the arbitary and excessive port fees imposed by Cranfield. He was investigated and found not at fault. However, the government of Barbados started posting fees in the port offices to prevent future abuses. He applied for a leave of absence later that year.

In January 1697, his leave was granted to return to England and he received permission to appoint deputies for the Naval Office and the Customs Office.

It can be assumed he spent the remainder of his days living in England because an October 1699 letter from Governor Ralph Grey to the Board of Trade makes reference to corruption and malfeasance found in the Naval Office while it was managed by Cranfield.

=== Death and Legacy ===
Edward Cranfield died 5 November 1700 and was buried 3 days later in Bath Abbey in Section A.539. Also buried there are his 3 year old daughter Elizabeth who died 20 September 1697 (Section A.803) and his wife, Mary, who survived him by 50 years and was buried 10 September 1750 (Section A.718).

Cranfield Street in New Castle, New Hampshire is named after him.

Government offices
| Preceded by Richard Waldron as President of the Province of New Hampshire | Governor of the Province of New Hampshire; 1682–85 | Succeeded by Walter Barefoote (acting) |
