= Edward Randolph (colonial administrator) =

English colonial administrator (1632-1703)

Edward Randolph (1632 – April 1703) was an English colonial administrator, best known for his role in effecting significant changes in the structure of England's North American colonies in the later years of the 17th century.

== Life ==
He was born in Canterbury, the son of Edmund Randolph M.D. and his wife Deborah Master. The merchant Bernard Randolph was his younger brother. He was admitted to Gray's Inn in 1650, and matriculated at Queens' College, Cambridge in 1651. It is not recorded that he was called to the bar, or received a degree.

In 1676, Randolph was the bearer of a royal letter to the governor and council of Massachusetts to resolve claims of his cousin Robert Tufton Mason. Mason was grandson of John Mason, and the heirs of Ferdinando Gorges, in the provinces of New Hampshire and Maine. Earning Randolph the reputation of "evil genius of New England and her angel of death", his reports to the Lords of Trade (predecessors to the 18th century Board of Trade) helped convince King Charles II to partition Norfolk County, Massachusetts Colony and send in Edward Cranfield and later to revoke the charter of the Massachusetts Bay Colony in 1684. In the aftermath of Gove's Rebellion, Randolph escorted Gove to prison at the Tower of London, and may have, as suggested by some sources, advocated for better treatment for Gove.

He was a leading figure in the unpopular Dominion of New England.

Randolph served as secretary of the dominion. While in that position, he argued for tighter Crown control over proprietary and charter colonies whose administrations lacked such oversight, and he was often given the difficult task of enforcing England's Navigation Acts in whichever colony he was posted to, often against significant local popular and political resistance. His actions were a significant contribution to the development of the American colonies' administrative infrastructure, but he remained unpopular in the dominion. During the 1689 Boston revolt, which deposed Edmund Andros and overthrew the dominion, he was jailed.

In 1691, Randolph was appointed surveyor general of the customs, on the American mainland as well as in some of the island colonies, and a year later received an additional appointment as deputy auditor of Maryland. Randolph urged William Blathwayt to pass legislation to prevent colonial misconduct related to trade in 1696. In 1696, Randolph appealed a Maryland Navigation Act case, Randolph v. Blackmore which set the operational balance between jury freedom and judicial administration in that place. Having visited all the colonies north of the Bahamas, he made a presentation to the government with a view to have the charters revoked in the American colonies by the parliament of 1700. Facing a postponed bill, the lawyer filed his evidence in a chancery court.

== Death ==
In 1702 Randolph seized a vessel, questioning its seaworthiness, but the authorities of Maryland put it back in the trade. Randolph resided in York County, Virginia, but died on Virginia's eastern shore in 1703.

== In literature ==
The fate of Edward Randolph—and the bitter feelings he engendered among the populace—is dealt with in "Edward Randolph's Portrait," one of the stories that make up Nathaniel Hawthorne's Legends of the Province House, a quartet of tales that first appeared in 1838–1839.

== See also ==
- Commissioners for Trade and Plantations
- Ferdinando Gorges
- York County, Virginia
