= Province of New Hampshire =

British colony in North America (1629–1776) (intermittently)

Coordinates: 43.0754°N 70.7605°W

- 1629–1641; 1679–1686; 1689–1776
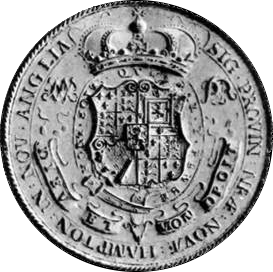
- Flag Seal of the Province of New Hampshire, 1692
- Anthem: God Save the King (1745–1783)
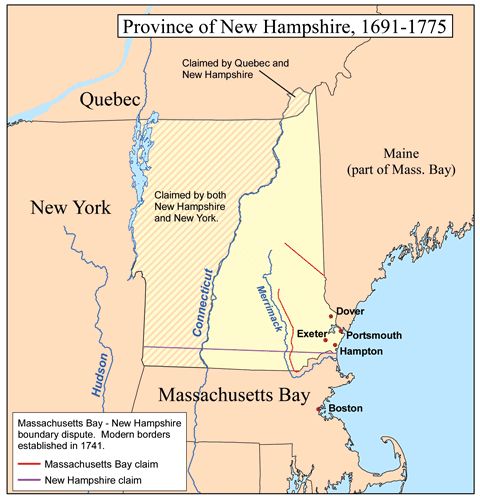
- Map of the province
- Status: Colony of England (1629–1641, 1679–1686, 1689–1707); Colony of Great Britain (1707–1776)
- Capital: None (1630–1641); Boston (1641–1679); Portsmouth (1679–1686); Boston (1686–1689); Portsmouth (1689–1776); Exeter (de facto 1774–1776)
- Common languages: English (sole language of government); Abenaki; Various other indigenous languages
- Government: Land grant colony; (1629–1641); Self-governing colony; (1679–1686); (1689–1776)
- President
  - 1679–1681: John Cutt
  - 1681–1767: (list)
  - 1767–1775: John Wentworth
- Legislature: General Court of New Hampshire
  - Upper house: Executive Council
  - Lower house: House of Representatives
- History
  - Established: 1629
  - First royal charter issued, governance from 1680: 1679
  - Dominion of New England: 1686–1689
  - Second royal charter issued, governance from 1692: 1691
  - Disestablished: 1776
- Currency: New Hampshire pound (Often pegged to the Pound sterling); Spanish dollar; Pound sterling; Pine tree shilling
Preceded by
Province of Maine
Massachusetts Bay Colony
Dominion of New England
Succeeded by
Massachusetts Bay Colony
Dominion of New England
New Hampshire
- Today part of: United States: New Hampshire

Topographical map of the province

The Province of New Hampshire was an English colony and later a British province in New England. It corresponds to the territory between the Merrimack and Piscataqua rivers on the eastern coast of North America. It was named after the English county of Hampshire in southern England by Captain John Mason in 1629, its first named proprietor. In 1776, the province established an independent state and government, the State of New Hampshire, and joined with twelve other colonies to form the United States.

The English first settled New Hampshire in the 1620s, and the province consisted for many years of a small number of communities along the seacoast, Piscataqua River, and Great Bay. These villages were primarily settled by the Puritans during their migration to New England, though New Hampshire was often a destination of Puritan dissenters from Massachusetts. In 1641 the communities were organized under the government of the Massachusetts Bay Colony, until Charles II issued a colonial charter for the province and appointed John Cutt as President of New Hampshire in 1679. After a brief period as a separate province, the territory was absorbed into the Dominion of New England in 1686. Following the collapse of the unpopular dominion, on October 7, 1691, New Hampshire was again separated from Massachusetts and organized as an English crown colony. Its charter was enacted on May 14, 1692, during the coregency of William and Mary, the joint monarchs of England, Scotland, and Ireland. Between 1699 and 1741, the province's governor was often concurrently the governor of the Province of Massachusetts Bay. This practice ended completely in 1741, when Benning Wentworth was appointed governor. Wentworth laid claim on behalf of the province to lands west of the Connecticut River, east of the Hudson River, and north of Massachusetts, issuing controversial land grants that were disputed by the Province of New York, which also claimed the territory. These disputes resulted in the eventual formation of the Vermont Republic and the U.S. state of Vermont.

The province's economy was dominated by timber and fishing. The timber trade, although lucrative, was a subject of conflict with the Crown, which sought to reserve the best trees for use as ship masts in accordance with the Broad Arrow Policy which extended to New Hampshire in 1698. Although the Puritan leaders of Massachusetts ruled the province for many years, the New Hampshire population was religiously diverse, originating in part in its early years with refugees from opposition to religious differences in Massachusetts.

From the 1680s until 1760, New Hampshire was often on the front lines of military conflicts with New France and the Abenaki people, seeing major attacks on its communities in King William's War, Dummer's War, and King George's War. The province was at first not strongly in favor of independence, but with the outbreak of armed conflict at Lexington and Concord many of its inhabitants joined the revolutionary cause. After Governor John Wentworth fled New Hampshire in August 1775, the inhabitants adopted a constitution in early 1776. Independence as part of the United States was confirmed with the 1783 Treaty of Paris.

== Before colonization ==
Prior to English colonization, the area that is now northeastern New England was populated by bands of the Abenaki, who lived in sometimes-large villages of longhouses. Depending on the season, they would either remain near their villages to fish, gather plants, engage in sugaring, and trade or fight with their neighbors, or head to nearby fowling and hunting grounds; later they also farmed tobacco and the "three sisters": corn, beans, and squash. The seacoast was explored in the early years of the 17th century by English and French explorers, including Samuel de Champlain and John Smith.

== Early English settlement ==
Permanent English settlement began after land grants were issued in 1622 to John Mason and Sir Ferdinando Gorges for the territory between the Merrimack and Sagadahoc (Kennebec) rivers, roughly encompassing present-day New Hampshire and western Maine. Settlers, whose early leaders included David Thomson, Edward Hilton and his brother William Hilton, began settling the New Hampshire coast as early as 1623, and eventually expanded along the shores of the Piscataqua River and Great Bay. These settlers were mostly intending to profit from the local fisheries. Mason and Gorges, neither of whom ever came to New England, divided their claims along the Piscataqua River in 1629. Mason took the territory between the Piscataqua and Merrimack and called it "New Hampshire", after the English county of Hampshire.

Conflicts between holders of grants issued by Mason and Gorges concerning their boundaries eventually led to a need for more active management. In 1630, Captain Walter Neale was sent as chief agent and governor of the lower settlements on the Piscataqua (including Strawbery Banke, present-day Portsmouth), and in 1631 Captain Thomas Wiggin was sent to govern the upper settlements, comprising modern-day Dover, Durham and Stratham. After Mason died in 1635, the colonists and employees of Mason appropriated many of his holdings to themselves. Exeter was founded in 1638 by John Wheelwright, after he had been banished from the neighboring Massachusetts Bay Colony for defending the teachings of Anne Hutchinson, his sister-in-law. In the absence of granting authority from anyone associated with the Masons, Wheelwright's party purchased the land from local Indians. His party included William Wentworth, whose descendants came to play a major role in colonial history. Around the same time, others unhappy with the strict Puritan rule in Massachusetts settled in Dover, while Puritans from Massachusetts settled what eventually became Hampton.

Because of a general lack of government, the New Hampshire settlements sought the protection of their larger neighbor to the south, the Massachusetts Bay Colony. In 1641, they collectively agreed to be governed from Massachusetts, provided the towns retained self-rule, and that Congregational Church membership was not required for their voters (as it was in Massachusetts). The settlements formed part of that colony until 1679, sending representatives to the Massachusetts legislature in Boston. Mason's heirs were in the meantime active in England, seeking to regain control of their territory, and Massachusetts was coming under increasing scrutiny by King Charles II. After decades of petitions from Robert Tufton Mason, Charles issued a charter in 1679 establishing the Province of New Hampshire, with John Cutt as its first president.

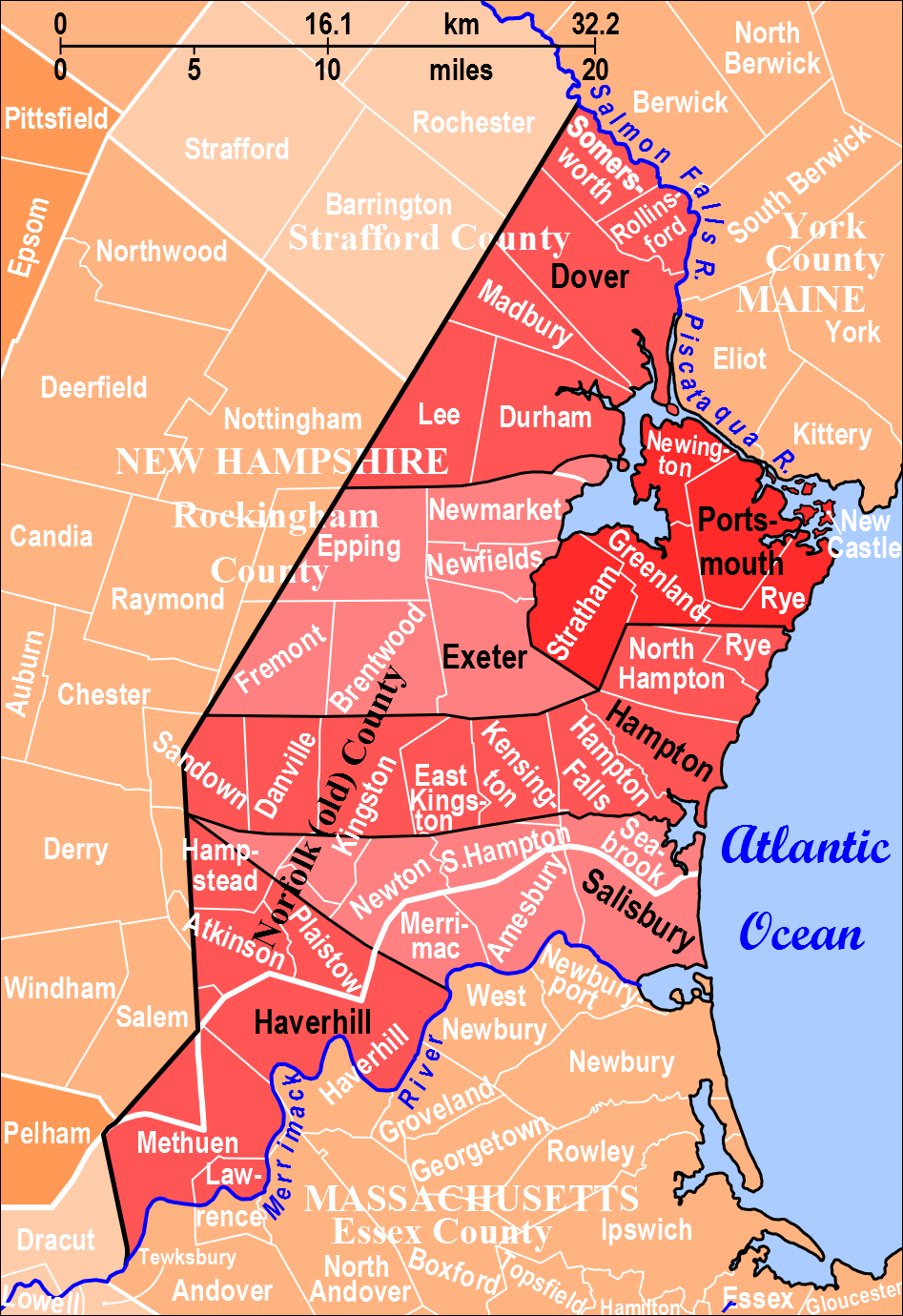
Map of Norfolk County, Massachusetts, on the eve of separation (modern names in white)

== First royal charters ==
In January 1680, Cutt took office, ending Massachusetts governance. However, Cutt and his successor, Richard Waldron, were strongly opposed to the Mason heirs and their claims. Consequently, Charles issued a second charter in 1682 with Edward Cranfield as governor. Cranfield strongly supported the Mason heirs, making so many local enemies in the process that Edward Gove attempted a rebellion in 1683. Cranfield was recalled in 1685, leaving the province in chaos. In 1686, the territory was brought into the Dominion of New England, an attempt to unify all of the New England colonies into a single government. The New Hampshire towns did not suffer as much under the rule of Sir Edmund Andros as did Massachusetts. After word of the Glorious Revolution reached Boston, Massachusetts authorities conspired to have Andros arrested and sent back to England. This left the New Hampshire towns without any colonial administration, just as King William's War erupted around them. Subjected to significant French and Indian raids, they appealed to Massachusetts Governor Simon Bradstreet, who oversaw them until William III and Mary II issued new, separate charters in 1691 for both Massachusetts and New Hampshire.

== 1691 charter ==
Samuel Allen, a businessman who had acquired the Mason claims, was appointed the first governor under the 1691 charter. He was equally unsuccessful in pursuing the Mason land claims, and was replaced in 1699 by Richard Coote, the Earl of Bellomont. Bellomont was the first in a series of governors who ruled both New Hampshire and the Province of Massachusetts Bay. Until 1741 the governorships were shared, with the governor spending most of his time in Massachusetts. As a result, the lieutenant governors held significant power. The dual governorship became problematic in part because of territorial claims between Massachusetts and New Hampshire. Since the southern border of the original Mason grant was the Merrimack River, and the Massachusetts charter specified a boundary three miles north of the same river, the claims conflicted, and were eventually brought to the king's attention. In 1741, King George II decreed what is now the border between Massachusetts and New Hampshire, and separated the governorships, issuing a commission to Benning Wentworth as New Hampshire governor.

Wentworth broadly interpreted New Hampshire's territorial claims, believing that territories west of the Connecticut River belonged to New Hampshire. In a scheme that was effective at lining his own pockets, he sold land grants in this territory for relatively low prices, but required parts of the grants to be allocated to himself. These grants brought New Hampshire into conflict with the Province of New York, the other claimant to the territory. King George III in 1764 ruled in New York's favor, setting off a struggle between the holders of the New Hampshire Grants and New York authorities that eventually resulted in the formation of the state of Vermont. The controversy also resulted in the replacement of Wentworth by his nephew John, who would be the last royal governor of the province.

Since the province was on the northern frontier bordering New France, its communities were frequently attacked during King William's War and Queen Anne's War, and then again in the 1720s during Dummer's War. Because of these wars the Indian population in the northern parts of the province declined, but settlements only slowly expanded into the province's interior. The province was partitioned into counties in 1769, later than the other twelve colonies that revolted against the British Empire.

== American Revolution ==
Depending on perspective, the Pine Tree Riot in 1772 may be considered one of the earliest acts of resistance in the American Revolution. Twelve other colonies joined with New Hampshire in resisting attempts by the British Parliament to impose taxes. The first overt armed act of resistance to the British government was the Capture of Fort William and Mary in December 1774. After the American Revolutionary War began in earnest in April 1775, the province recruited regiments which served in the Siege of Boston. Sir John Wentworth, the last royal governor, fled New Hampshire in August 1775 and consequently, the province was the first British colony to formally establish an independent government, as the State of New Hampshire, in January 1776.

== Demographics ==
Historical population
Year	Pop.	±%
1630	500	—
1640	1,055	+111.0%
1650	1,305	+23.7%
1660	1,555	+19.2%
1670	1,805	+16.1%
1680	2,047	+13.4%
1690	4,164	+103.4%
1700	4,958	+19.1%
1710	5,681	+14.6%
1720	9,375	+65.0%
1730	10,755	+14.7%
1740	23,256	+116.2%
1750	27,505	+18.3%
1760	39,093	+42.1%
1770	62,396	+59.6%
1773	73,097	+17.2%
1780	87,802	+20.1%
Source: 1630–1760; 1773 1770 & 1780

From 1630 to 1780, the population of New Hampshire grew from 500 to 87,802. In 1623, the first permanent English settlements, Dover and Rye, were established, while Portsmouth was the largest city by 1773 with a population of 4,372. The black population in the colony grew from 30 in 1640 to 674 in 1773 (ranging between 1 and 4 percent of the population), but declined to 541 (or 0.6 percent of the population) by 1780.

In New Hampshire, unlike some of the other New England Colonies, the Puritan Congregational Church was not the established church in the colony. Following the First Great Awakening (1730–1755), the number of regular places of worship in New Hampshire had grown to 46 in 1750 (40 Congregational, five Presbyterian, and one Anglican), and to 125 regular places of worship by 1776 (78 Congregational, 27 Presbyterian, 13 Baptist, four Friends, two Episcopal, and one New Light Congregational).

== Culture ==
While New Hampshire had a larger population of Quakers and Anglicans than the Massachusetts Bay Colony, the culture was primarily dominated by the Puritans. For the first 50 years, members of the government were required to be members of the Congregational Church. Parish taxes were paid by all members of the community due to Established Congregationalism in New England.

=== Education ===
While New Hampshire was a part of Massachusetts, the towns followed standard Puritan custom of setting aside land to build a schoolhouse in accordance with Massachusetts School Laws. During the period of union with Massachusetts, the towns would contribute a portion of tax money to fund Harvard College.

Later on in the 18th century, Royal Governor John Wentworth provided the land upon which Dartmouth College would be built and on December 13, 1769, issued a royal charter in the name of King George III establishing the college.

=== Holidays ===
Pope Night was celebrated on November 5 as the New England variant of Guy Fawkes Night. Celebrations were documented as occurring as late as 1892.

Christmas was banned in Massachusetts in 1659, and since New Hampshire was at times part of the Massachusetts Colony, it was banned there too. It remained banned after the initial separation from Massachusetts in 1679, but was introduced despite popular opposition by Edward Cranfield in 1683.

Governor Cranfield also attempted to introduce January 30 as a holiday to commemorate the execution of Charles I, but it is unclear how long celebrations lasted after he left.

Periodically, following New England custom, the government would declare days of humiliation and thanksgiving, depending on circumstances. A Fast Day was declared by Richard Waldron to mark the occasion of the death of John Cutt in 1681, and it remained celebrated in New Hampshire until April 1991.

== See also ==
- List of colonial governors of New Hampshire
