= Quit-rent =

Type of land tax

Quit rent, quit-rent, or quitrent was a form of rent or land tax imposed on occupants of freehold or leased land in lieu of services owed to a higher landowning authority, usually a government, proprietor, or other holder of superior title.

Over time, especially after the decline of feudalism, quit rents increasingly resembled conventional forms of land tax. Governments and proprietors continued to impose quit rents on land grants and property holdings, particularly in colonial territories, where they became part of broader systems of land administration and revenue collection.

== Origins and feudal usage ==
Under English feudal law, the payment of quit rent (Latin Quietus Reditus, pl. Reditus Quieti) freed the tenant of a holding from performing certain obligations required under feudal tenure, such as labour services or other customary duties owed to a superior landholder. Quit rents functioned as a form of commutation, allowing feudal obligations to be replaced by fixed monetary payments as landholding and agricultural relations became increasingly monetised during the later medieval and early modern periods.

In some cases, quit rents also compensated for rights retained by others over the land, such as hunting, grazing, or other customary privileges, which might otherwise interfere with its full use and cultivation.

Traditional feudal quit rents differed from ordinary forms of taxation in that they were tied to specific legal obligations and customary arrangements attached to the land. Rather than serving as arbitrary taxes imposed by the state, quit rents generally represented fixed monetary payments substituted for labour services, feudal dues, or other obligations associated with land tenure.

Failure to pay a quit rent could result in the restoration of the original feudal obligations or other customary burdens connected to the holding, rather than unlimited financial penalties imposed by the government.

== 18th century ==
Quit rents were widely used by colonial governments throughout the British Empire as part of systems of land tenure, imperial administration, and revenue collection. In many colonies, land grants issued by proprietors or the Crown required settlers and landholders to pay annual quit rents in exchange for legal title and continued possession of the land. These payments helped colonial authorities assert legal and political claims over territory while also generating revenue from settlement and agricultural expansion.

In colonial America, quit rents became an important feature of landholding systems in several British colonies during the seventeenth and eighteenth centuries. Proprietary colonies such as Maryland and Pennsylvania frequently attached quit rent obligations to land grants issued to settlers, while Crown colonies also used quit rents as a means of administering land ownership and collecting revenue. Quit rents formed part of broader efforts by colonial governments to regulate settlement, formalise land tenure, and strengthen imperial authority over expanding frontier regions.

The collection of quit rents was often difficult and unpopular among colonists. Disputes over land titles, surveys, arrears, and enforcement contributed to tensions between settlers, proprietors, and colonial governments in several colonies. In some areas, resistance to quit rent collection became intertwined with broader political disputes concerning taxation, land speculation, and imperial administration.

== 19th century ==
Quit rents continued to be used in British colonies and protectorates in Asia and elsewhere during the nineteenth and twentieth centuries. In British North Borneo, for example, Proclamation IX of 1902 required indigenous landholders claiming cultivated land to obtain formal land titles, subject to registration fees and annual quit rent payments.

In many countries, quit rents were later abolished or replaced by more uniform systems of land taxation as feudal and colonial land tenure systems declined. However, in some countries, including Malaysia, quit rents continue to function as a source of government revenue derived from land ownership.

== See also ==
- Quit Rents ceremony
