= John Mason (governor) =

English sailor and politician

2nd Proprietary Governor Cuper's Cove
- In office 1615–1621
- Monarch: James I
- Preceded by: John Guy
- Succeeded by: Robert Hayman

Personal details
- Born: 1586 King's Lynn, Norfolk
- Died: 1635 (aged 48–49) St Stephens church, Bristol
- Known for: naming New Hampshire

Captain John Mason (1586–1635) was an English sailor and colonist who was instrumental to the establishment of various settlements in colonial America and is considered to be the 'Founder of New Hampshire'.

Mason was born in 1586 at King's Lynn, Norfolk, and educated at Peterhouse, Cambridge.

== Early career ==
In 1610, he was appointed by James I to help reclaim the Hebrides for English-speaking rule, from Gaelic-speaking clan chiefs. He served as Captain of the expedition consisting of two ships of war and two pinnaces. As a reward, he was granted exclusive fishing rights in the North Sea. This was ignored by the Dutch and he was treated as a pirate by the Scots. In 1615, he was arrested, but soon released after the seizure of his ship.

== Newfoundland ==
He was appointed the second Proprietary Governor of Newfoundland's Cuper's Cove colony in 1615, succeeding John Guy of Bristol, who had resigned. Mason arrived on the island in 1616 and explored much of the territory. He compiled a map of the island and wrote and published a short tract (or "Discourse") of his findings.

Mason drew up a map of the island of Newfoundland. Published in William Vaughan's Cambrensium Caroleia in 1625, the map included previously established placenames as well as new ones such as Bristol's Hope and Butter Pots, near Renews. His tract entitled A Briefe Discourse of the New-Found-Land with the situation, temperature, and commodities thereof, inciting our nation to go forward in the hopefull plantation begunne, was published in 1620 by Mason while in England.

In 1620 King James I's Privy Council issued Mason a commission and provided him with a ship to suppress piracy in Newfoundland. Mason ceased to be Cuper's Cove governor in 1621 and apparently he was not replaced, although the settlement continued to be occupied throughout the seventeenth century.

Preceded by John Guy	Governor of Cuper's Cove; 1615–1621	Succeeded by Admiral Robert Hayman

== Nova Scotia ==
Upon returning to England in 1621, Mason consulted with Sir William Alexander about the possibility of establishing settlements on Nova Scotia. Alexander obtained a charter for Nova Scotia in September 1621.

== New England ==
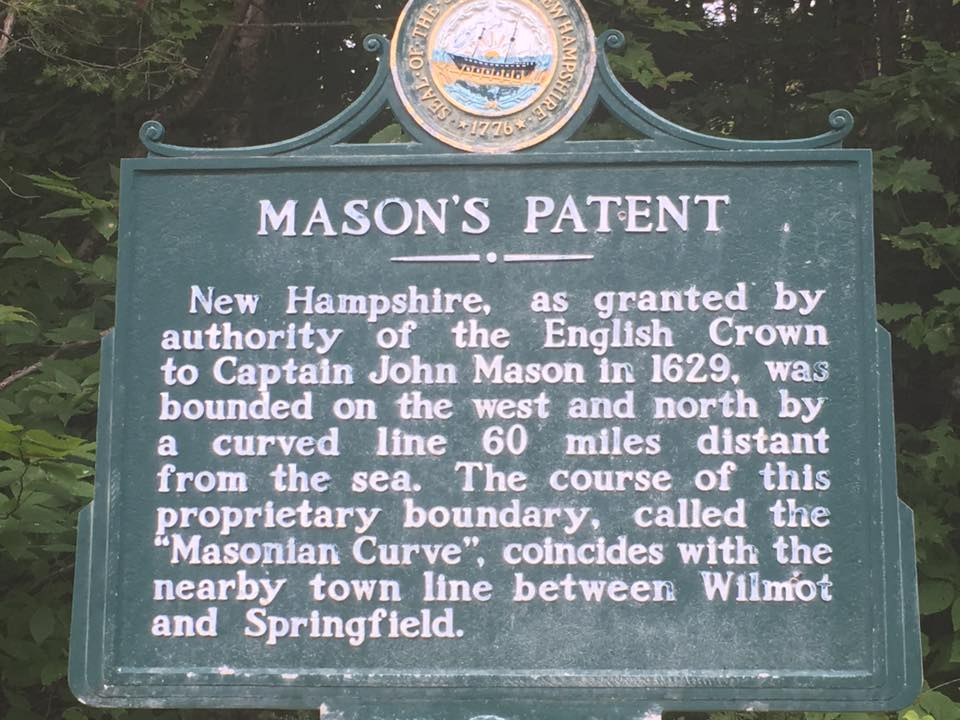
New Hampshire historical marker (number 40) for Mason's Patent

Captain Mason was granted several land grants describing land in present day New Hampshire and Maine in the years from 1621 - 1631.

In 1622, Mason and Sir Ferdinando Gorges received a land patent from the Plymouth Council for New England for the territory lying between the Merrimack and Kennebec rivers, extending 60 miles inland. In 1629 they divided the grant along the Piscataqua River, with Mason receiving the southern portion. The colony was recharted as the Province of New Hampshire. It included most of the southeastern part of the current state of New Hampshire, as well as portions of present-day Massachusetts north of the Merrimack.

The Plymouth Council granted to Captain Mason the grant of Laconia on Nov. 17, 1629, comprising an inland tract of land of indefinite bounds, intended to describe inland lands behind the tract described in 1622.

Although Mason never set foot in New England, he was appointed first vice-admiral of New England in 1635. His brother-in-law, John Wollaston of London had an interest in New Hampshire, which he transferred to Mason in the summer of 1635. He died that same year while preparing for his first voyage to the new colony.

Mason left his claims to New Hampshire to his grandsons, John and Robert Tufton on the condition they take the surname Mason. After John died, Robert did just that and pursued his claims to the Province of New Hampshire in the court of King Charles II.
