= Contemplation (disambiguation) =

Contemplation is a type of prayer or meditation.

Contemplation or Contemplator may also refer to:

- Anussati, specific Buddhist meditational or devotional practices
- Speculative reason
- Contemplation (short story collection), by Franz Kafka
- "Contemplations" (poem), a poem by Anne Bradstreet
- "Contemplate" (song), a 2017 song by Savoy and Grabbitz
- Contemplation (EP), a Mike Garson album
- "Contemplation", a composition by McCoy Tyner from The Real McCoy (1967)
- Contemplations, a series of exercises in the Amitayurdhyana Sutra
- Contemplator (Marvel Comics), a comic book character
- Contemplate (pop duo), Romanian musical duo
- Christian contemplation (contemplatio)
