= Simon Bradstreet (disambiguation) =

Simon Bradstreet (c.1603–1697) was a 17th-century colonial governor of Massachusetts.

Simon Bradstreet may also refer to:

- Sir Simon Bradstreet, 1st Baronet (1693–1762) of the Bradstreet baronets
- Sir Simon Bradstreet, 2nd Baronet (1728–1773) of the Bradstreet baronets
- Sir Simon Bradstreet, 4th Baronet (1772–1853) of the Bradstreet baronets

== See also ==
- Simon Bradstreet Robie (1770–1858), lawyer, judge and political figure in Nova Scotia
- Bradstreet, surname
