= John Bradstreet (Salem witch trials) =

- Born: July 22, 1652; Andover, Massachusetts Bay Colony
- Died: January 11, 1718 (aged 65); Topsfield, Province of Massachusetts Bay

John Bradstreet (22 July 1652 – 11 January 1718) was an accused "witch" during the Salem Witch Trials.

== Salem Witch Trials ==
Bradstreet encountered some of the "afflicted girls" in the street, after which a dog barked at him and ran away. The girls accused him of witchcraft, and Bradstreet immediately fled to New York. He returned to Massachusetts after the hysteria died down. The dog was hanged as a witch.

== Family ==
John Bradstreet was the son of Governor Simon Bradstreet and his wife Anne Dudley Bradstreet. Anne's father was Thomas Dudley, another governor of Massachusetts Bay. He married Sarah Perkins of Topsfield (Province of Massachusetts) on 11 June 1677 and died in Topsfield, at the age of 65. John's brother, Dudley, was Justice of the Peace in Andover and another accused "witch".

He and Sarah Perkins had these and other children:

1. Simon, married Elizabeth Capen.
2. Mercy, married John Hazen.
3. Samuel, married first Sarah Clarke, second Elizabeth Champman
