= Dudley Bradstreet (magistrate) =

American magistrate (1648–1702)

Justice of the Peace for Essex County
- In office June 1692 – 13 November 1702

Member of the Massachusetts Governor's Council
- In office 1698–1702

Personal details
- Born: 1648 Cambridge, Massachusetts Bay Colony
- Died: 13 November 1702 (aged 53–54) Andover, Province of Massachusetts Bay
- Spouse: Anne Wood Price
- Children: 3
- Occupation: Magistrate

Military service
- Allegiance: Massachusetts Colonial Militia
- Rank: Colonel

Dudley Bradstreet (1648 – 13 November 1702) was an American magistrate who served as the Justice of the Peace of Andover, Massachusetts during the Salem Witch Trials.

== Early life ==
Bradstreet was born in 1648 to Simon Bradstreet and Anne Dudley Bradstreet in Cambridge, Massachusetts, moving to Andover as an infant. He served as a colonel in the colonial militia, a Deputy to the General Court of Massachusetts, and in the Massachusetts Governor's Council from 1698 until 1702.

== Salem Witch Trials ==
During the Salem Witch Trials, Bradstreet was Justice of the Peace for Andover. He issued warrants for the arrest and imprisonment of forty-eight suspected "witches", after which he refused to issue any more. As a result, Bradstreet and his wife, Anne, were accused of witchcraft and forced to flee the area. In December 1692, Bradstreet's name appears atop a 1692 petition to the Superior Court of Judicature at Salem to free fellow residents of Andover from prison. Also signing this petition was Rev. Francis Dane.

== Personal life ==
In Reference to Her Children (excerpt)

My fifth, whose down is yet scarce gone,
Is 'mongst the shrubs and bushes flown.
And as his wings increase in strength,
On higher boughs he'll perch at length.

— Anne Bradstreet

He was the fifth son of Governor Simon Bradstreet and his wife, the poet Anne Dudley Bradstreet. Anne's father, Thomas Dudley, was also Governor of Massachusetts Bay Colony. One of his brothers, John Bradstreet, was also implicated in the witch trials.

Bradstreet married Anne Wood Price, daughter of Richard and Anne (Priddeth) Wood and widow of Theodore Price. Their children were:

1. Margaret, married Job Tyler, son of Moses Tyler.
2. Dudley, married Mary Wainwright.
3. Anne, died in infancy.

Bradstreet was an ancestor of 20th-century U.S. President Herbert Hoover.

== Death ==
He died on 13 November 1702 in Andover.
