= Anne Bradstreet (Salem witch trials) =

Anne Wood Price Bradstreet
- Born: Anne Wood c. 1650; Andover, Massachusetts Bay Colony
- Died: 1707; Andover, Province of Massachusetts Bay

Anne Wood Price Bradstreet (c. 1650 – 1707) was the wife of Dudley Bradstreet and accused "witch" during the Salem Witch Trials.

== Salem Witch Trial ==
Dudley Bradstreet was accused of witchcraft after he refused to issue warrants for accused witches. Anne and her husband fled the area to avoid arrest.

== Family ==
Anne was the daughter of Richard and Anne (Priddeth) Wood of Barbados. She first married Theodore Price of Andover and had the following children:

1. Elizabeth, married Thomas Barnard.

Next, she married Dudley Bradstreet, son of Simon Bradstreet and Anne Dudley Bradstreet. They had the following children:

1. Margaret, married Job Tyler, son of Moses Tyler.
2. Dudley, married Mary Wainwright.
3. Anne, died in infancy.

Bradstreet is an ancestor of U.S. President Herbert Hoover.
