= Governor Dudley =

Governor Dudley may refer to:

- Joseph Dudley (1647–1720), Governor of the Province of Massachusetts Bay from 1702 to 1715
- Thomas Dudley (1576–1653), 3rd, 7th, 11th, and 14th Governor of the Massachusetts Bay Colony at various points between 1634 and 1651
