= Bradstreet =

Bradstreet is a surname. Notable people with the surname include:

- Anne Bradstreet, early American writer of Puritan prose and poetry
- Jeff Bradstreet, American physician and founder of the Good News Doctor Foundation
- John Bradstreet, British officer in the French and Indian War
- Simon Bradstreet, husband of Anne and governor of the Massachusetts Bay Colony from 1679 to 1686
- Thomas D. Bradstreet (1841–1915), American politician from Connecticut
- Tim Bradstreet, American artist and commercial illustrator
- James Bradstreet Greenough, American classical scholar

Fictional characters:

- Inspector Bradstreet, a fictional police officer appearing in Arthur Conan Doyle's Sherlock Holmes novels

== See also ==
- Bradstreet Observatory of Eastern University in St. Davids, Pennsylvania
- Dun & Bradstreet, a company providing business information and known for its Data Universal Numbering System
- David Bradstreet - Canadian Singer-Songwriter
