= Grabbitz =

American musician and producer (born 1993)

- Born: Nicholas Chiari; February 18, 1993 (age 33); Buffalo, New York, US
- Genres: EDM; dubstep; trap; indie dance; dance-rock; drum and bass; electro
- Occupations: Record producer; musician; composer; DJ
- Instruments: Digital audio workstation; piano; guitar; violin; cello
- Years active: 2012–present
- Labels: Ultra; Monstercat; Mau5trap; High Intensity; Hopeless
- Website: grabbitzmusic.com

Nicholas Chiari (born February 18, 1993), commonly known by his stage name Grabbitz, is an American electronic music producer, musician, composer, and DJ. He first gained attention in the EDM community with the song "Here with You Now", which was released on Monstercat in July 2014. He has collaborated with a variety of artists, including Savoy, Sullivan King, and Pegboard Nerds.

== Career ==
Grabbitz released his first single, "Here With You Now", on the record label Monstercat, in September 2014. It appeared on his debut EP, Friends, which came out a year later. The album also included the singles "Turn Around" and "Friends".

In May 2015, he remixed the track "Build the Cities" by Karma Fields, featuring Kerli. In November, he remixed the song "Get On Up" by Pegboard Nerds and Jauz. Later that month, he issued the single "Float Away", from his upcoming EP Better with Time, which was released in December.

March 2016 saw Grabbitz issue a collaborative single with Pegboard Nerds, titled "All Alone". In November, he published the single "Follow Me", which preceded his debut full-length album, Things Change, released in 2017. In July 2017, he collaborated with Savoy on the single "Contemplate".

In June 2019, Grabbitz released the single "Crazy as You" with Sullivan King. In April 2022, he published his second full-length album, Time Isn't Real, which was followed in August 2023 by yet another studio album, Let Them Only See Butterflies.

== Discography ==
=== Studio albums ===
Title	Album details
Things Change	Released: May 19, 2017; Label: None (self-released); Format: Digital download
Time Isn't Real	Released: April 1, 2022; Label: Hopeless Records; Format: Digital download
Let Them Only See Butterflies	Released: August 11, 2023; Label: Monstercat; Format: Digital download
Big Epic Nothing	Released: February 28, 2025; Label: Blue Butterfly Records; Format: Digital download

=== EPs ===
Title	Album details
Handle Yourself	Released: October 1, 2012; Label: Self-released; Formats: Digital download
Friends	Released: April 27, 2015; Label: Monstercat; Formats: Digital download
Better with Time	Released: December 11, 2015; Label: Monstercat; Formats: Digital download
In the Dark	Released: June 28, 2024; Label: Blue Butterfly Records; Formats: Digital download

=== Singles ===
==== As lead artist ====
Title	Year	Album
"151" / "Fire"	2013	Non-album singles
"Biodome"	2013	Non-album singles
"Here with You Now"	2014	Friends
"Turn Around" (Note: "Turn Around" did not appear on any major chart but peaked at #26 on Billboard Twitter Emerging Artists)	2014	Friends
"Friends" (with Faustix)	2015	Friends
"Way Too Deep"	2015	Friends
"Ballin'" / "Don't Stop"	2015	Non-album single
"Float Away"	2015	Better with Time
"Better with Time"	2015	Better with Time
"Get Ya Body Down"	2015	Non-album singles
"All Alone" (with Pegboard Nerds)	2016	Non-album singles
"Follow Me"	2016	Things Change
"In the Winter"	2017	Non-album single
"Don't Let Me Go"	2017	Things Change
"Play This Game"	2017	Things Change
"I Think That I Might Be Going Crazy"	2017	Things Change
"Contemplate" (with Savoy)	2017	Non-album singles
"Told Ya So"	2017	Non-album singles
"My Cloud"	2018	Non-album singles
"Information Overload" (with Pierce Fulton)	2018	Non-album singles
"Polaroid"	2019	Non-album singles
"Crazy as You" (with Sullivan King)	2019	Non-album singles
"King / Ghost in Song"	2019	Non-album singles
"Bruises" (with Nghtmre)	2019	Non-album singles
"Roam with You"	2019	Non-album singles
"Where the End Begins"	2020	Non-album singles
"Someone Else" (with Rezz)	2020	Non-album singles
"Fly on the Wall"	2021	Non-album singles
"Rolls Royce" (with Tisoki)	2021	Non-album singles
"Pigs in the Sky"	2021	Time Isn't Real
"Pain Killer"	2021	Time Isn't Real
"Teleport" / "Comedown"	2022	Time Isn't Real
"The Ugly"	2022	Time Isn't Real
"Pretty Melody 70"	2022	Time Isn't Real (Deluxe)
"When You & Me Dance"	2022	Time Isn't Real (Deluxe)
"You Were Right" (with Illenium and Wooli)	2023	Illenium
"Signal" (with Rezz)	2023	Non-album singles
"Torn Open" (with Kill Script and Eddie)	2023	Non-album singles
"Sandcastle" (with Jayceeoh)	2023	Non-album singles
"Hero"	2023	Let Them Only See Butterflies
"Let It Bloom"	2023	Let Them Only See Butterflies
"Falling Over You" (with Lucille Croft)	2023	Non-album single
"Insidious" (with Subtronics)	2024	Non-album singles
"Sky Turns Red"	2024	Non-album singles
"Fire" (with Imanu)	2024	Non-album singles
"Cheerleader"	2024	Non-album singles
"Hero Pt. II"	2024	Big Epic Nothing
"The World's Saddest Christmas Song"	2024	Non-album single
"Saint Maniac"	2025	Big Epic Nothing
"Love You 'Til I'm Dead" (feat. Rezz)	2025	Big Epic Nothing
"Nothing at All" (with Dabin)	2025	Aura Park

==== As featured artist ====
Title	Year	Charts	Album
Title	Year	US Dance	Album
"Colors" (Boombox Cartel featuring Grabbitz)	2016	—	Non-album single
"Let Go" (Deadmau5 featuring Grabbitz)	2016	11	W:/2016Album/
"Show Stopper" (Sullivan King featuring Grabbitz)	2019	—	The Demented EP
"At Night" (3lau and Shaun Frank featuring Grabbitz)	2020	—	Non-album single
"Help" (Sullivan King featuring Grabbitz)	2021	—	Loud
"Die for You" (Valorant featuring Grabbitz)	2021	—	Non-album single
"Into Pieces" (Subtronics featuring Grabbitz)	2022	—	Fractals
"Ticking Away" (Valorant featuring Grabbitz & bbno$)	2023	—	Non-album single
"Power" (Subtronics and Level Up featuring Grabbitz)	2024	—	Non-album single
"Turning Around" (Wuthering Waves featuring Grabbitz)	2026	—	Non-album single
"If the Sun Burns out Tonight" (Valorant featuring Grabbitz, Oli Sykes and Courtney LaPlante)	2026	—	Non-album single
"—" denotes a recording that did not chart or was not released.

=== Guest appearances ===
Title	Year	Album
"Let Go" (Grabbitz Edit) (deadmau5 featuring Grabbitz)	2017	We Are Friends, Vol. 7

=== Remixes ===
Title	Year	Original artist(s)	Album
"Love Runs Out"	2014	OneRepublic	Love Runs Out (Remixes)
"Taking Over" (featuring Cassandra Kay)	2014	Favright	Taking Over (The Remixes)
"Build the Cities" (featuring Kerli)	2015	Karma Fields	Build the Cities (Reconstructions)
"Get On Up"	2015	Jauz and Pegboard Nerds	Get On Up (The Remixes)
"Propane Nightmares"	2018	Pendulum	The Reworks
"With You"	2019	Haywyre	Panorama: Form Remixes
"At Night" (featuring Grabbitz)	2020	3lau, Shaun Frank	At Night (Remixes)
"Own Worst Enemy"	2021	Robert DeLong	Non-album single
"Into Pieces" (featuring Grabbitz) (remixed with Wooli)	2022	Subtronics	Non-album single
