= Verses upon the Burning of Our House =

Here Follow Some Verses upon the Burning of Our House, July 10, 1666
- by Anne Bradstreet
- Written: 1666
- Country: Massachusetts Bay Colony
- Language: English language
- Subject: Puritanism
- Form: Couplet
- Rhyme scheme: AA BB

Full text
- Verses upon the Burning of our House at Wikisource

"Here Follow Some Verses upon the Burning of Our House, July 10, 1666", commonly shortened to "Verses upon the Burning of Our House", is a poem by Anne Bradstreet. She wrote it to express the traumatic loss of her home and most of her possessions. However, she expands the understanding that God had taken them away in order for her family to live a more pious life.

Bradstreet feels guilty that she is hurt from losing earthly possessions. It is against her belief that she should feel this way; showing she is a sinner. Her deep puritan beliefs brought her to accept that the loss of material was a spiritually necessary occurrence. She reminds herself that her future, and anything that has value, lies in heaven. Though she feels guilty, she knows that she is one of the fortunate ones who have salvation regardless; God gives it to his followers, and will help them fight their sin on this earth. The burning of her house was to fight her family's sins of material idols.

The poem has a couplet-based rhyme scheme. It has many lines with an inverted syntax, making lines sound "odd".
