= Yardley Hastings =

Village in Northamptonshire, England

Coordinates: 52.204°N 0.734°W

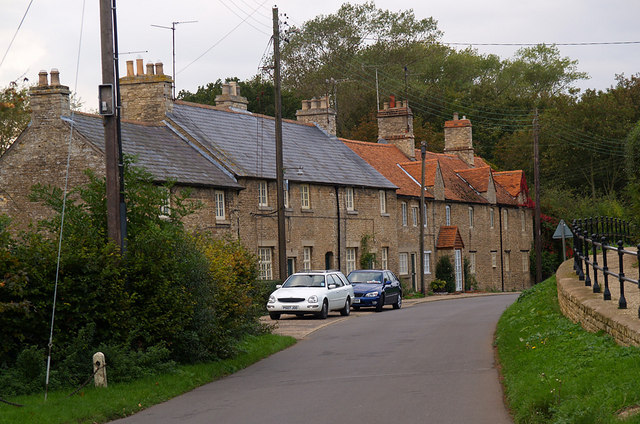
- Yardley Hastings

- Location within Northamptonshire
- Interactive map of Yardley Hastings
- Population: 745 (2011 Census)
- OS grid reference: SP865570
  - London: 64 miles (103 km) SE
- Civil parish: Yardley Hastings
- Unitary authority: West Northamptonshire
- Ceremonial county: Northamptonshire
- Region: East Midlands
- Country: England
- Sovereign state: United Kingdom
- Post town: NORTHAMPTON
- Postcode district: NN7
- Dialling code: 01604
- Police: Northamptonshire
- Fire: Northamptonshire
- Ambulance: East Midlands
- UK Parliament: South Northamptonshire

Yardley Hastings is a village and civil parish in West Northamptonshire, England. It is located south-east of Northampton and is skirted on its south side by the main A428 road to Bedford.

== History ==
The village's name means 'rod wood/clearing', a place where they were made or acquired. The 'de Hastinges' family are mentioned in connection with the village in 1250.

Thomas Dudley was born in Yardley Hastings in 1576. He sailed to New England on the Arbella in 1630 and became Governor of the Massachusetts Bay colony. He signed the charter of Harvard College in 1650.

Bouttoll Downing was born in Yardley Hastings in 1510. Ten generations later, in 1820, "his descendant Sarah Downing" married John Abbey in Yardley Hastings where further generations continued to live.

The village was struck by an F0/T1 tornado on 23 November 1981, as part of the record-breaking nationwide tornado outbreak on that day. Yardley Hastings is the village in which Marianne Faithfull's character Maggie lives in the 2007 film Irina Palm.

== Buildings ==
The parish church is dedicated to St Andrew, and has a 13th-century west tower and the remains of a Norman wall. It also has exceptional examples of Romanesque detailing.

The former Congregational chapel dates from 1813 and subsequently became home to a congregation of the United Reformed Church. Worship here commenced in 1672 when a licence was granted to John Neale of Yardley Hastings, permitting him to use his cottage for the purpose of worship, and this represents the first recorded instance of nonconformity in Yardley Hastings. Records of worshippers were initially kept to a minimum since at this time many nonconformists were persecuted and imprisoned, with many in the 17th century emigrating to America where they were able to enjoy freedom of worship. As a result, there appears to be a total absence of early records until a meeting house was erected and the first minister (Doddridge) was ordained in 1730.

Doddridge was joined by Drake in 1735 and they both preached at Yardley until 1758, when Drake moved to nearby Olney. However, there was no minister at Yardley from 1758 until Thomas Raban was ordained in 1783. Raban had many commitments in Olney and much of the day-to-day administration was undertaken by the rector James Gardiner whose signature can be found on several marriage certificates including that of "Edward Abbey married to Sarah Wooden 30th January 1794", the Abbey family being resident in the area for many years.

Thomas Raban died in 1802 following an accident and in 1804 "John Hoppus" from London was ordained. As a result of his outstanding leadership, the earlier decline in membership was reversed and a gallery for the chapel was constructed along with an adjoining house for the minister (The Manse). In 1813 the chapel was destroyed by fire, but the Manse survived which presumably housed many of the parish records since a series of records survive from both before and after the fire.

Original copies of the documents listed below are on file. Edward Abbey married Sarah Wooding 30 January 1794, Ruth Abbey daughter of Edward & Sarah Abbey baptised 7 April 1798, Ann Abbey daughter of Edward & Sarah Abbey baptised 30 October 1803, John Abbey married to Sarah Downing 24 December 1820, Abraham son of John and Sarah Abbey baptised by John Hoppus May 1822. "A photograph of Abraham Abbey and his brothers" was taken in the chapel about 1860.

Within months John Hoppus had raised enough money to rebuild the chapel twice the size of the original which was completed within a year and still stands today.

John Hoppus resigned in 1834 dying a few years later in 1837. He was succeeded by Henry John Bunn for a short period until 1838 when James Spong briefly became minister until 1842.

William Todman then started his 14 years term as minister resigning in 1856 during which he frequently noted that many of the congregation had died, emigrated or lost interest. Some were even expelled for unspecified sins. Nevertheless, efforts were made to bring those who had lost their way back into the congregation. Mention is made of failed attempts to save Elizabeth Wooding, related to the Abbey family by Sarah Wooding's marriage in 1794, who was eventually regarded as no longer a member of the church. During William Todman's term as minister, the significant addition of a schoolroom was built adjoining the chapel on the North side.

William Maunsell then became minister from 1858 to 1862 when William Mellonie briefly took over for just a few months. Then in 1863 Joseph Clinton was elected deacon caretaker until James Harbutt from Leicestershire became minister in 1865 although he died within only a few months of taking up the position. From 1867 to 1872 James Ault was minister and he was followed by William Edward Coupland who undertook many improvements to the premises during his 34 years term as minister. The church was without a minister from 1906 to 1910 when the post was given to Edwin Palmer until 1914. Subsequent ministers were as follows: W Robinson 1915 to 1918 Alfred Martindale 1918 to 1926 William Fletcher 1927 to 1931 E Arthur Shand 1931 to 1936 during which time the church was upgraded from oil lamps to electric lighting Edward Skilton 1937 to 1958 retiring after 56 years in the ministry, 21 of them at Yardley Hastings Edgar Preston 1958 to 1964

The chapel, together with the manse and ancillary buildings, were converted into the National Youth Resource Centre of the United Reformed Church in 1991. The buildings ceased to be used for this purpose in 2003, and are now the "Crossways Retreat and Conference Centre" initiated under the auspices of the East Midlands Synod of the United Reformed Church.

The Manor House just north of the parish church has the remains of the hall of Hastings Mansion of c. 1320–1340.

The old Rectory in the north of the village is dated 1701.

== Governance ==
The local parish council is Yardley Hastings Parish Council.

== Sport ==
A greyhound racing track was opened off the Bedford Road in around 1934. The racing was independent (not affiliated to the sport's then governing body, the National Greyhound Racing Club) and was known as a flapping track, which was the nickname given to independent tracks. The venue, which had a capacity of around 500, closed in 1949.
