= Jojee =

American singer-songwriter (born 1990)

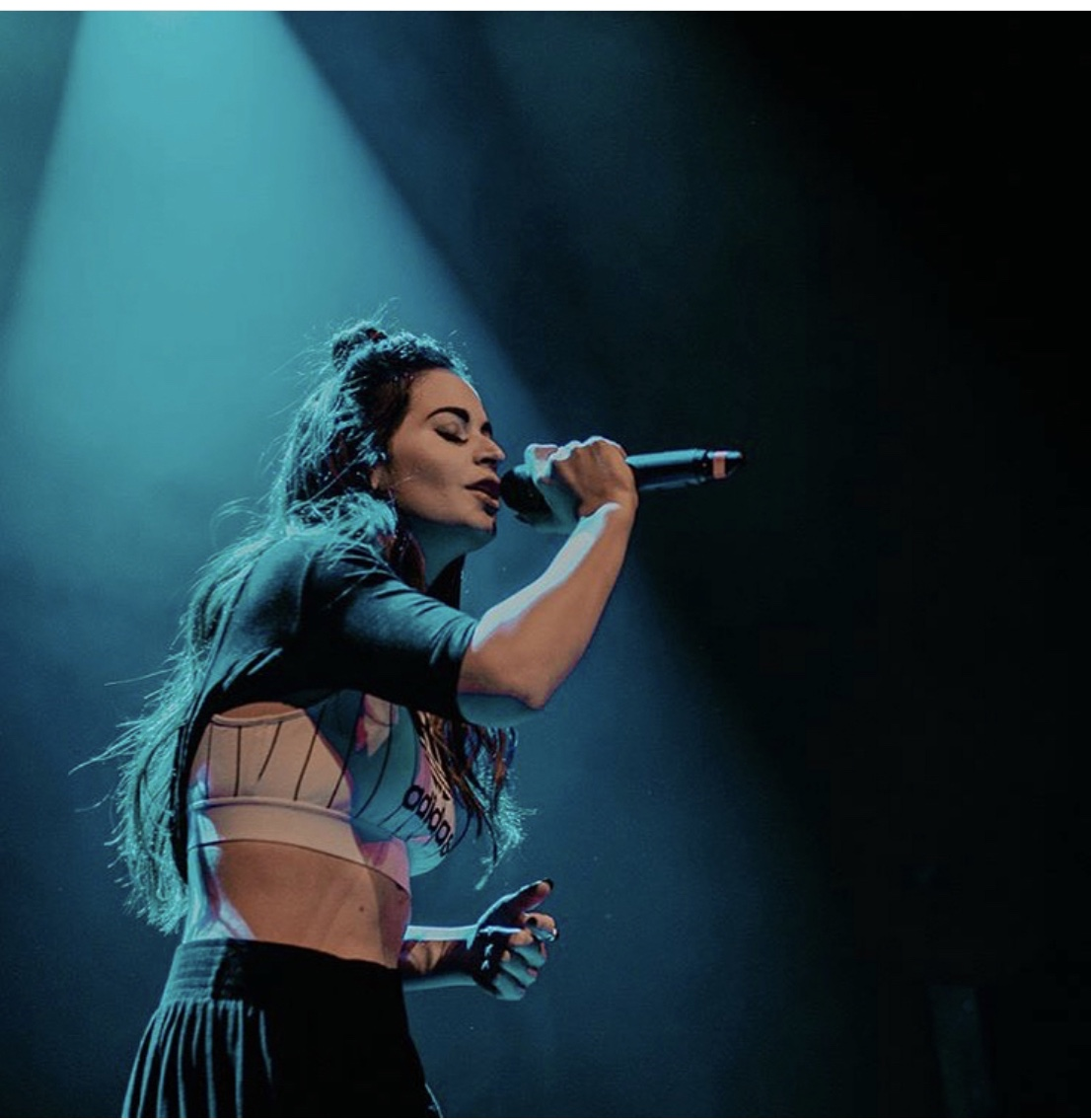
- Jojee in 2019 at Irving Plaza

Background information
- Born: Joanna Louise Barratt; Nashua, New Hampshire, United States
- Genres: Pop • Indie pop • electronic
- Occupation: Singer • Songwriter • Vocal producer
- Instrument: Vocals
- Years active: 2015-present
- Label: Spinnin' • Armada • Monstercat • Warner Chapell Music
- Website: www.jojeeofficial.com

Joanna Barratt, known mononymously as Jojee, is an American singer and songwriter. She first gained recognition in 2015 following the release of her debut feature, "Leaving You", a collaboration with electronic music acts Savoy and Sound Remedy, released through the Canadian record label Monstercat. The track marked her introduction to the electronic and indie-pop music scenes.

== Early life ==
Joanna Barratt was raised in Greensboro, North Carolina. She attended Weaver Academy for performing and visual arts for acting followed by Northwest Guilford High School, where she began developing her singing and songwriting.

== Career ==
In 2016, Jojee released her debut extended play (EP) titled Low Key, which further established her as a rising talent as an independent artist. Her unique vocal style and emotionally charged lyrics caught the attention of music blogs and online platforms, helping her build a growing fanbase through social media, SoundCloud and YouTube.

Following her early success as an independent recording artist, Jojee signed as a songwriter with Atlas Music Publishing (now under Ithaca Holdings) where she began working behind the scenes with a range of established writers and artists.

In June 2019, there was a leaked version of "In A Cage" featuring Jojee from Lil Wayne's unreleased Velvet Sessions project produced by Onhel and Rome that boosted her career as a songwriter.

In addition to her solo work and songwriting, Jojee has collaborated with various artists and producers, including Charming Horses, Syn Cole, and Matisyahu.

== Discography ==
=== EPs ===
- Low Key - Jojee (2016)

=== Singles ===
- Leaving You - Savoy and Sound Remedy featuring Jojee (2015)
- I Don't Give A - Jojee (2015)
- Think Of Anything - Jojee (2015)
- Poison Fruit - Jojee (2017)
- Stay- Savoy (2017)
- I Got This - Charming Horses featuring Jojee (2018)
- Everywhere - Paige featuring Jojee (2018)
- Take Me - Andrew Luce & Alexander Lewis featuring Jojee (2018)
- Picture Perfect - Paige featuring Jojee (2019)
- In A Cage - Lil Wayne featuring Jojee (2019)
- Come Home - Sam Silver, BEIIIA, Pipo Fernandez, Jojee (2019)
- Feeling - Paige featuring Jojee (2019)
- Wicked - Syn Cole featuring Jojee (2021)
- Beginnings - JDYN HILL (2023)
- Glory - Midsplit featuring Jojee (Unreleased)

=== Songwriting credits ===
- Your Anything - Lara Maxen (2015)
- Just Say It - Fly By Midnight (2018)
- Gold - Sister Sparrow (2018)
- Aquarium - Carter Reeves (2018)
- Basi L'gani - Matisyahu (2025)
