= Flashbacks (EP) =

Flashbacks EP

EP by Contemplate
- Released: 6 April 2018
- Genre: Pop
- Length: 15:23
- Producer: Contemplate

Flashbacks EP is the first extended play by Romanian Pop duo Contemplate. It was released worldwide on 6 April 2018.

== Track listing ==
All tracks are written by Contemplate.

No.	Title	Length
1.	"Walk Away"	3:44
2.	"Dance of Love"	3:19
3.	"Angels"	4:39
4.	"Walk Away" (Acoustic Version)	3:41
Total length:		15:23

== Personnel ==
Credits adapted from allmusic data of Flashbacks.

- Contemplate – all instruments, production (all tracks); programming (all tracks)
- Mihai Hotiu – Piano (tracks 1, 3)
- Larisa Tămaș – Violin (tracks 1, 2, 3)
- Rebecca Pomeranz – Lyrics Assistant (tracks 1, 2, 3)
