= Two Brothers Rocks–Dudley Road Historic District =

Historic district in Massachusetts, United States

- U.S. National Register of Historic Places
- U.S. Historic district
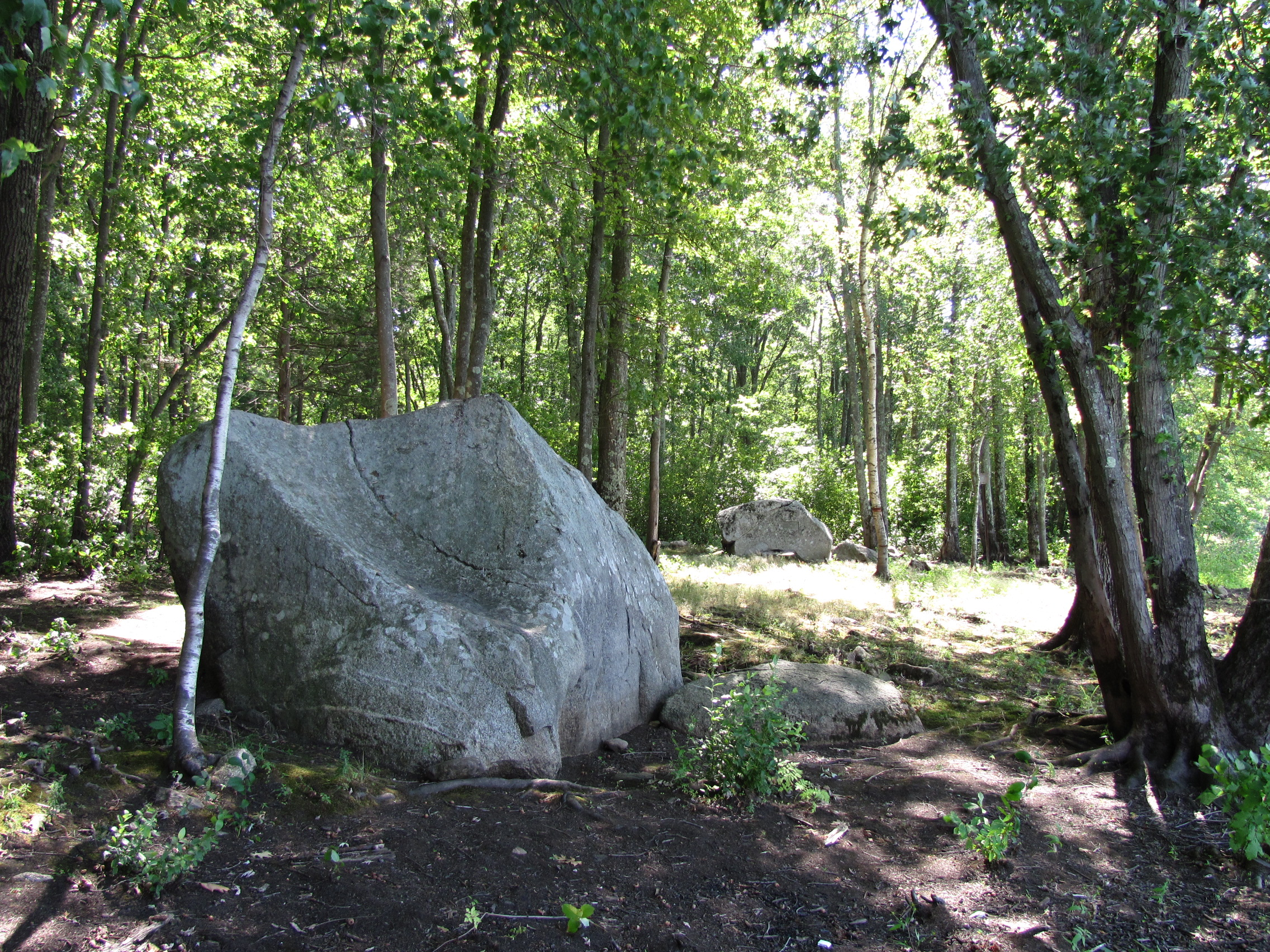
- Winthrop and Dudley Rocks (Dudley in foreground)

- Location within Massachusetts Location within the United States
- Location: Bedford and Billerica, Massachusetts
- Coordinates: 42.520494°N 71.302968°W
- NRHP reference No.: 10000790
- Added to NRHP: September 23, 2010

The Two Brothers Rocks–Dudley Road Historic District encompasses a historically significant rural area of Bedford and Billerica, Massachusetts. The district covers 230 acres (93 ha) of predominantly rural and residential property, along Dudley Road, a narrow, winding road that was laid out in colonial days. It also includes a significant amount of conservation land, including local, state, and federal lands. The federal lands of the Great Meadows National Wildlife Refuge which line the banks of the Concord River, include the "Two Brothers Rocks", which were used to mark a land boundary between grants given to early Massachusetts Bay Colony governors John Winthrop and Thomas Dudley, and which featured as boundary markers into the 20th century.

The two large rocks were inscribed with the year 1638 and the names Dudley and Winthrop by a descendant of Dudley's named Dudley Leavitt Pickman, as noted in the Bedford Town Report in 1889.

The district was listed on the National Register of Historic Places in 2010. The Two Brothers Rocks are accessible either via watercraft on the Concord River, or by trails through Bedford's Altmann Conservation Area.

== See also ==
- National Register of Historic Places listings in Middlesex County, Massachusetts
