= Savoy (American band) =

American electronic rock band

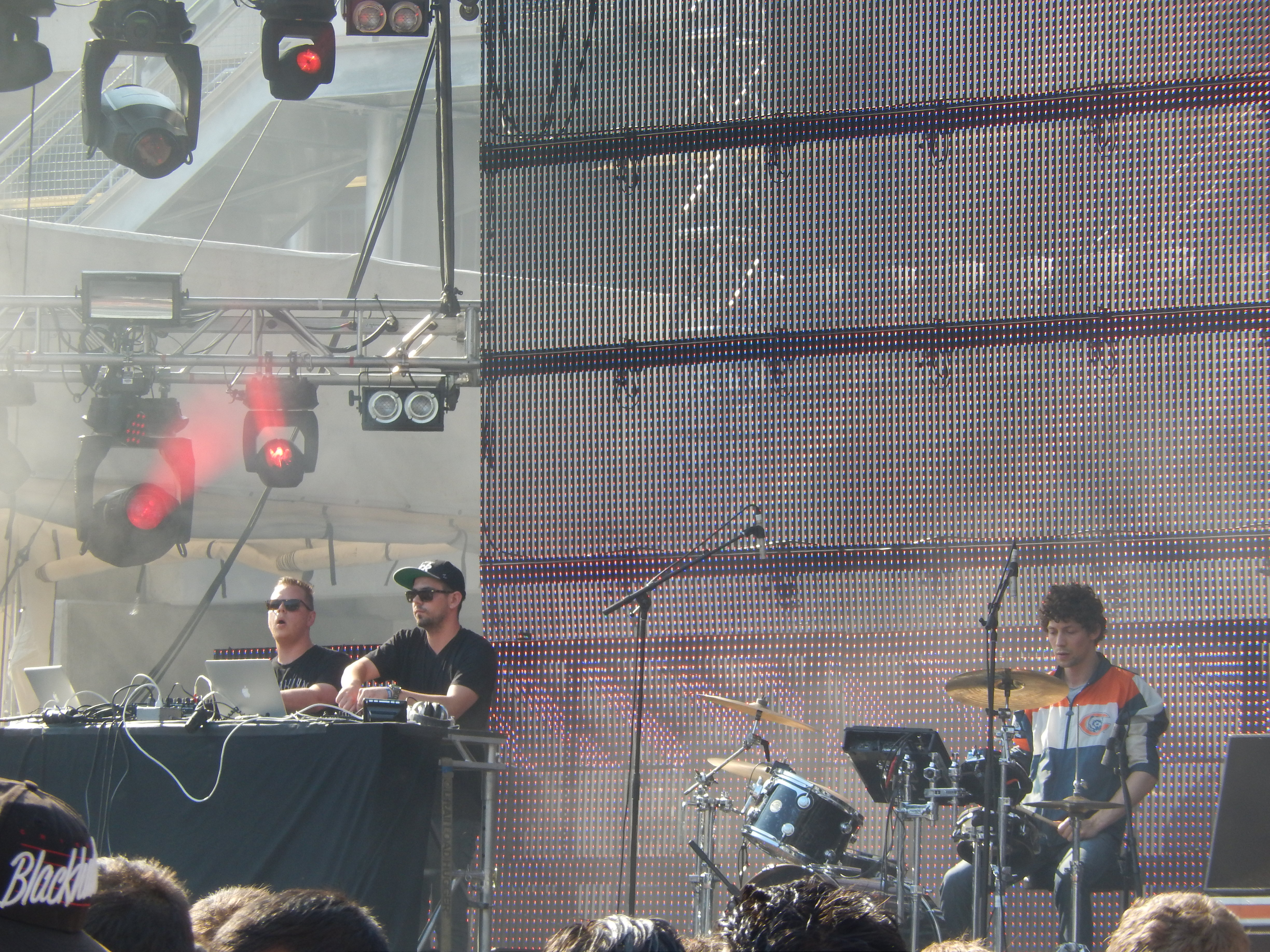
- Savoy in 2013, performing at Spring Awakening

Background information
- Origin: Brooklyn, New York; Denver, Colorado
- Genres: Electronica, rock
- Years active: 2009–present
- Members: Gray Smith; Ben Eberdt; Mike Kelly
- Website: www.savoyband.com

Savoy is a musical group from Boulder, now living in Brooklyn, consisting of producer Gray Smith, guitarist Ben Eberdt, and drummer Mike Kelly.

== Career ==
Savoy's musical style fuses the classic sound of rock 'n' roll with techno, dance, and bass music, a genre they've championed known as ERM (Electronic Rock Music). Savoy's performances feature live instrumentation (drums and guitar), extensive lighting and laser production, as well as vocals from grammy nominated artist Heather Bright, Chali 2na, and more.

Since 2009, Savoy has released 2 full-length albums and 3 EPs including their 2014, 15 track release, "Self Predator", and their latest 2015 EP, "1000 Years" (Monstercat), which reached #3 on the iTunes Dance Chart.

Savoy has performed at festivals such as Lollapalooza, Wakarusa, X Games, Voodoo Experience, Spring Awakening, Electric Daisy Carnival, Ultra Music Festival, Mysteryland, and more. The group has also headlined Red Rocks Amphitheatre in 2012 and 2015 and embarked on 5 headlining US tours.

== Discography ==
=== Albums ===
- Automatic (2009)
- Supertrail (2012)
- Self Predator (2014)

=== Extended plays ===
- "Personal Legend" (2013)
- Three Against Nature (2013)
- 1000 Years - Monstercat (2015)
- Tomorrow Today (Pt. 1) - Rat King Productions (2017)

=== Singles ===
- "Free Agent" – Manufactured Music (2011)
- "Under My Skin" – Manufactured Music (2011)
- "Kili" – Manufactured Music (2011)
- "DIY" – Manufactured Music (2012)
- "We Are The Sun" (with Heather Bright) - Spinnin' Records (2012)
- "Under My Skin (DIY) (featuring SOFI) - Spinnin' Records (2012)
- "Leaving You" (with Sound Remedy; featuring Jojee) – Monstercat (2015)
- "A1" (with Prismo; featuring K!NG Z3U$) - Firepower Records (2015)
- "Love Is Killing Me" (featuring Chali 2na) - Monstercat (2016)
- "The Wolf" (with Bright Lights) - Rat King Productions (2016)
- "Neon Nebraska" (featuring Porsches) - Rat King Productions (2016)
- "Living Color" (featuring FATHERDUDE) - Rat King Productions (2017)
- "Contemplate" (with Grabbitz) - Monstercat (2017)
- "How U Like Me Now" (featuring Roniit) - Monstercat (2017)
- "No Quarter" (2017)
- "Up All Night" (featuring Laura Reed) (2017)
- "Don't Quit Me Now" (2018)
- "Let You Go" - Monstercat (2018)
- "Treat Me Right" (featuring Laura Reed) (2018)
