= Samuel Bradstreet =

Irish politician, barrister and judge

Sir Samuel Bradstreet, 3rd Baronet (October 1738 – 2 May 1791) was an Irish politician, barrister and judge. His independence of mind as a politician gave rise to the somewhat misleading nickname "Slippery Sam".

He was the second son of Sir Simon Bradstreet, 1st Baronet of Riversdale House in Kilmainham, Dublin and his wife and first cousin Ellen Bradstreet, daughter of Samuel Bradstreet of Gowran, County Kilkenny and Elizabeth Agar. In 1773, Samuel succeeded his older brother Simon as third baronet. He was educated at Trinity College Dublin and was then called to the Bar by the Middle Temple in 1758, becoming King's Counsel in 1767

In 1766, he became Recorder of Dublin. Bradstreet entered the Irish House of Commons as Member of Parliament (MP) for Dublin City in 1776, representing the constituency until 1784, when he was appointed Fourth Justice at the Court of King's Bench (Ireland). Ironically, like several of his colleagues, Bradstreet as a politician had opposed increasing the number of High Court judges: Elrington Ball remarked cynically that an increase in the salary and a guarantee of security of tenure soon convinced him of the error of his ways. Unlike many of his colleagues, he was able to work harmoniously with his Chief Justice, John Scott, 1st Earl of Clonmell, who called him "my assistant".

He was a good and frequent speaker in Parliament: though loosely associated with the Irish Patriot Party he clashed on occasion with Henry Grattan, and claimed that the liberties granted by the Constitution of 1782 were insufficient. He prided himself on independence of mind; according to Ball his nickname "Slippery Sam" did not mean that he was corrupt or untrustworthy but rather that no party could ever count on his support.

He was described as firm and decisive in character, rough in manner, and enormously fat (Chief Justice Scott, who was himself rather heavy, flippantly called him "the double man").

On 19 January 1771, he married Elizabeth Tully, daughter of Dr. James Tully, a Dublin physician, and his wife Bridget Netterville, a distant cousin of Viscount Netterville, and had by her four sons. Bradstreet died at his home in Booterstown in County Dublin. He was succeeded in the baronetcy by his oldest son Simon. His widow died in 1799.

Legal offices
Preceded by James Grattan	Recorder of Dublin; 1766–1784	Succeeded by Dudley Hussey
Parliament of Ireland
Preceded by William Clement; Redmond Morres	Member of Parliament for Dublin City; 1776–1784; With: William Clement 1776–1782; Travers Hartley 1782–1784	Succeeded by Travers Hartley; Nathaniel Warren
Baronetage of Ireland
Preceded by Simon Bradstreet	Baronet (of Castilla); 1773–1791	Succeeded by Simon Bradstreet
