= The Tenth Muse Lately Sprung Up in America =

1650 poetry book by Anne Bradstreet

The Tenth Muse, Lately Spring Up in America, By a Gentlewoman in those parts
- Author: Anne Bradstreet
- Language: English language
- Genre: Poetry
- Publication date: 1650
- Publication place: United States
- Media type: Print

The Tenth Muse, lately Sprung up in America is a 1650 book of poetry by Anne Bradstreet. It was Bradstreet's only work published in her lifetime. Published purportedly without Bradstreet's knowledge, Bradstreet wrote to her publisher acknowledging that she knew of the publication. She was forced to pretend she was unaware of the publication until afterwards, or she would have risked harsh criticism. Bradstreet wrote the poem "The Author to Her Book" in 1666 when a second edition was contemplated. The book was published, without Bradstreet's knowledge, by the Rev. John Woodbridge. Woodbridge took the manuscript to England where it was published.

The "Four Monarchies" is regarded by some critics as an epic poem.

== Criticism ==
Many critics believe that Bradstreet was a woman who pushed the boundaries of her religion. Fortunately for her, she did not suffer negative consequences like Anne Hutchinson, who was also a Puritan writer of her time. Other writers such as Ann Stanford and Samuel Eliot Morison have also critiqued The Tenth Muse Lately Sprung Up in America. Stanford felt that in Bradstreet's second edition of The Tenth Muse, she used her poetry to go against the Puritan society and should have been labelled as "rebellious" and "independent". On the other hand, Morison praised Bradstreet for being one of the most superior poets of her time.
