= Contemplate (pop duo) =

Romanian pop duo

- Origin: Baia Mare, Romania
- Genres: pop; new wave; synth pop; electronic rock; indie pop; cinematic
- Years active: 2015–present
- Members: Glad Condor; Vasiac Lucian a.k.a. Ronnie
- Website: www.contemplatemusic.com

Contemplate is a pop duo formed in 2015 in the city of Baia Mare, Romania. The duo consists of singer, Glad Condor, and multi-instrumentalist, Lucian Vasiac a.k.a. Ronnie. It was founded originally as Hiatus M by Glad Condor, back in 2009.

== History ==
=== 2010–2014: Formation and early career ===
Condor (born 6 January 1995 in Baia Mare) and Vasiac (born 10 May 1991 in Baia Mare) met in July 2010 during a local music festival in which Condor was performing with his band, Hiatus M. Although they both belonged to different bands they bonded over their similar taste in music. A couple of months later, Condor's band Hiatus M broke up. After failing to rebuild the band with other musicians, Condor reached out to Vasiac in attempt to join his band, Watercolor. Unfortunately, Vasiac's musical project was facing some difficulties and after a couple of jam sessions which included Condor, Watercolor also disbanded. This negative outcome eventually led to something really great, because Condor and Vasiac started to talk more, becoming very good friends.

In February 2011 they decided to form a new band together, keeping Condor's original band name, Hiatus M. On 23 July they performed in their first concert together at one of the local theaters in Baia Mare. Shortly after, they played their first ever song called "The World’s Song" live in a music contest held by the YMCA organisation. They won the prizes for the best guitarist (Condor) and for the best bassist (Vasiac). In the next couple of months, the band went through several changes due to the instability of its other members. Despite the changes, Hiatus M still managed to tour Romania, playing shows in several important cities. In 2012, after unsuccessfully attending some musical contests in Bucharest, the band broke up once again. This event made Condor and Vasiac reflect a lot more on the future of their musical project. After a break of several months, they started to explore music production, with the goal of finding their own sound and musical style. The year 2013 brought a third member into the band and they focused mainly on songwriting rather than live shows. In a relatively short period of time, the band managed to get some songs on the internet and started to build a small fanbase.

In 2014, they had their largest show ever, playing for a crowd of over a few thousand people at a big festival in Cluj-Napoca. Right after the show they were approached by a record label from Cluj-Napoca, called CDJ Record Label. They released two singles through this record label and on 31 December 2014, they released their first ever music video for a song called "Living for a Dream". The first half of 2015 was a success as the band played more and more music festivals in Romania. Their lack of management and organisation eventually led to the depletion of Hiatus M's fanbase. This was confirmed when the band attempted to perform on their own, but failed to gather enough audience members for any successful shows. Shortly after those shows, Condor and Vasiac found themselves on their own again after the other member of Hiatus M left due to some personal issues. They knew at that point that it was the end of the Hiatus M era but also the beginning of a new era. They embraced hard work and therefore got their confidence back to set the stage for a new musical project.

=== 2015–present: Feel The Vibe ===
The duo established itself in a home studio where they began writing songs. In the summer of 2015, after a three-day trip to the Carpathian Mountains, they decided to go by the name Contemplate. The name represents their personality and also the deepness of their newly found pop sound. Focusing more on feeling rather than technique, Contemplate started a new musical journey, experimenting, writing and producing many songs before finally reaching their full musical potential.

After three years of development, the pop/electronic duo released their debut EP, Flashbacks, in April 2018. The material consists of four tracks: "Walk Away", "Dance of Love", "Angels" and "Walk Away (Acoustic Version)“.In 2019 they released their first single called Feel The Vibe.

== Discography ==
- Flashbacks EP (2018)
- Feel The Vibe (single, 2019)
