= Contemplate (song) =

2017 single by Grabbitz and Savoy

Single by Savoy and Grabbitz

from the album Monstercat Uncaged Vol. 2
- Released: July 28, 2017
- Recorded: 2017
- Genre: Synth-pop
- Length: 3:53
- Label: Monstercat
- Songwriter(s): Nicholas Chiari
- Producer(s): Nicholas Chiari; Gray Smith; Ben Eberdt; Mike Kelly

Savoy singles chronology
"Leaving You" (2015)	"Contemplate" (2017)	"How U Like Me Now" (2017)

Grabbitz singles chronology
"In the Winter" (2017)	"Contemplate" (2017)	"Told Ya So" (2017)

"Contemplate" is a song by American electronic dance music producer Nicholas Chiari (stage name Grabbitz) and the electronic band Savoy. It was released on July 28, 2017, by the Canadian record label Monstercat

== Background ==
In an interview with Billboard, Chiari described his experience while collaborating with Savoy, writing:

They always deliver quality music and spend time to get it right. They sent me a rough instrumental, and I jumped on it because I connected with it right away. Really hope to perform it live with them someday.

Upon release of Contemplate, Savoy wrote how the band had been speaking to Chiari about collaborating for a long time up to that point, stating:

I think we're both in the same mindset of wanting to take our electronic and rock backgrounds to the next level and make something new and unique, but still relatable to what our fans know us for. We're really excited to be releasing this collaboration on Monstercat, which has been an amazing home to both of us in the past and has such an energized and loyal fanbase.

== Critical reception ==
Lauren Ikeen of This Song Slaps wrote that Contemplate features "a catchy beat and hard-hitting synths", further writing that the song "truly showcases both Savoy and Grabbitz’s unique set of skills and we hope there’s another collaboration in their future." Jeanette Kats of Noiseporn described the song as a combination of "pop and ’80s prog-rock influences with modern-day synth design and ethereal vocals for a wildly intriguing single." Katey Ceccarelli of EARMILK described the song as "genre-transcending" and called it an instant classic, further writing that the song is an "earworm of the best sort, marrying pensive lyrics with a cozy throwback tone, showing off the absolute best in each of these artists." Erik Mahal of EDM Sauce wrote that the song is a "thoughtful, emotional, and downright beautiful single", further writing "the synth work throughout is literally electrifying and the vocal hook which repeats throughout will capture your heart. When the song builds into a drop the only word that can be used to describe the feeling is, euphoric." Joe Weshefsky of EDMTunes described the song as a "very different, very 80s synthpop feel", noting Chiari's vocals as smooth and "only enhances that sound." Jordan Mafi of NEST HQ described the song as a "beautiful, dreamlike anthem", further writing that the song "draws you in with an alluring melody and the soothing voice of Grabbitz himself." Robyn Dexter of Dancing Astronaut wrote that the song "impeccably combines both of their styles", further stating that the song "has an effortless ’80s groove to it, with a carefree synth melody that floats smoothly throughout the course of the song."
