= Bradstreet baronets =

Extinct baronetcy in the Baronetage of Ireland

Bradstreet Baronets, of Castilla
- Escutcheon of the Bradstreet baronets of Castilla
- Arms: Argent, a Greyhound passant Gules, on a Chief Sable three Crescents Or. Crest: An Arm in Armour embowed the hand grasping a Scimitar, all proper. Motto: VIRTUTE ET NON VI (By virtue not by force)

The Bradstreet Baronetcy, of Castilla in County Dublin was created in the Baronetage of Ireland on 14 July 1759 for Simon Bradstreet. His son, the second Baronet died without male issue in 1773 and was succeeded by his younger brother, a Member of Parliament for Dublin in the Irish House of Commons, and later a judge. The fourth baronet was a barrister. The latter's elder son, the fifth Baronet died childless in 1889 and the title went to his younger brother. With the death of the seventh Baronet in 1924, the baronetcy became extinct.

== Bradstreet baronets, of Castilla (1759) ==
- Sir Simon Bradstreet, 1st Baronet (1693–1762)
- Sir Simon Bradstreet, 2nd Baronet (1728–1773)
- Sir Samuel Bradstreet, 3rd Baronet (died 1791)
- Sir Simon Bradstreet, 4th Baronet (1772–1853)
- Sir John Valentine Bradstreet, 5th Baronet (1815–1889)
- Sir Edward Simon Bradstreet, 6th Baronet (1820–1905)
- Sir Edward Simon Victor Bradstreet, 7th Baronet (1856–1924)
