= Simon Bradstreet =

English-born merchant and politician (1604–1697)

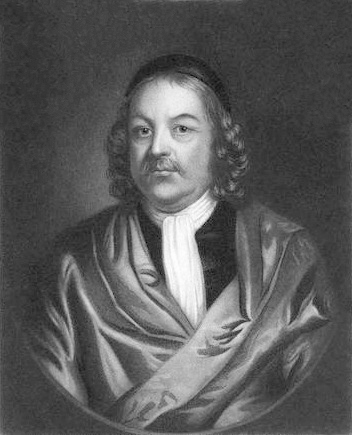
- Engraving based on a painting in the Massachusetts State House

20th and 21st Governor of the Massachusetts Bay Colony
- In office 1679–1686
- Preceded by: John Leverett
- Succeeded by: Joseph Dudley (as President of the Dominion of New England)
- In office May 24, 1689 – May 16, 1692
- Preceded by: Sir Edmund Andros (as Governor of the Dominion of New England)
- Succeeded by: Sir William Phips (as Governor of the Province of Massachusetts Bay)

Deputy Governor of Massachusetts Bay
- In office 1678–1679
- Governor: John Leverett
- Preceded by: Simon Symonds
- Succeeded by: Thomas Danforth

Secretary of Massachusetts Bay
- In office 1630–1636
- Preceded by: None, position established
- Succeeded by: Increase Nowell

Member of the Council of Assistants
- In office 1630–1678
- Governor: List: John Endecott (five times); John Winthrop (four times); Thomas Dudley (four times); John Haynes; Henry Vane the Younger; Richard Bellingham (three times); John Leverett
- In office 1679–1686
- Governor: Himself
- In office 1689–1692
- Governor: Himself

Commissioner for Massachusetts Bay
- In office 1644–1644
- In office 1648–1661
- In office 1663–1664
- In office 1669–1672
- In office 1674–1675
- In office 1677–1677

Personal details
- Born: baptized March 18, 1604 Horbling, Lincolnshire, England
- Died: March 27, 1697 (aged 93) Salem, Province of Massachusetts Bay
- Spouse: Anne Dudley Bradstreet (m. 1628; died 1672)
- Children: 8: Samuel, Dorothy, Sarah, Simon, Hannah, Mercy, Dudley, John.

Simon Bradstreet (baptized March 18, 1603/4 – March 27, 1697) was a New England merchant, politician and colonial administrator who served as the last governor of the Massachusetts Bay Colony. Arriving in Massachusetts on the Winthrop Fleet in 1630, Bradstreet was almost constantly involved in the politics of the colony but became its governor only in 1679.

He served on diplomatic missions and as agent to the crown in London, and also served as a commissioner to the New England Confederation. He argued for minority positions for accommodation of the demands of King Charles II following his restoration to the throne.

Bradstreet was married to Anne, the daughter of Massachusetts co-founder Thomas Dudley and New England's first published poet. He was a businessman, investing in land and shipping interests. Due to his advanced age (he died at 93) Cotton Mather referred to him as the "Nestor of New England".

== Early life ==
Simon Bradstreet was baptized on March 18, 1603/4 in Horbling, Lincolnshire, the second of three sons of Simon and Margaret Bradstreet. His father was the rector of the parish church, and was descended from minor Irish nobility. His grand nephew via his brother John Bradstreet was to become Sir Simon Bradstreet, 1st Baronet. With his father a vocal Nonconformist, the young Simon acquired his Puritan religious views early in life. At the age of 16, Bradstreet entered Emmanuel College, Cambridge. He studied there for two years, before entering the service of the Earl of Lincoln as an assistant to Thomas Dudley in 1622. There is some uncertainty about whether Bradstreet returned to Emmanuel College in 1623–1624. According to Venn, a Simon Bradstreet attended Emmanuel during this time, receiving an M.A. degree, but genealogist Robert Anderson is of the opinion that this was not the same individual. During one of Bradstreet's stints at Emmanuel he was recommended by John Preston as a tutor or governor to Lord Rich, son of the Earl of Warwick. Rich would have been 12 in 1623, and Preston was named Emmanuel's master in 1622.

Bradstreet took over Dudley's position when the latter moved temporarily to Boston in 1624. On Dudley's return several years later, Bradstreet then briefly served as a steward to the Dowager Countess of Warwick. In 1628 he married Dudley's daughter Anne, when she was 16.

In 1628, Dudley and others from the Earl of Lincoln's circle formed the Massachusetts Bay Company, with a view toward establishing a Puritan colony in North America. Bradstreet became involved with the company in 1629, and in April 1630, the Bradstreets joined the Dudleys and colonial Governor John Winthrop on the fleet of ships that carried them to Massachusetts Bay. There they founded Boston, the capital of the Massachusetts Bay Colony.

== Massachusetts Bay Colony ==
After a brief stay in Boston, Bradstreet made his first residence in Newtowne (later renamed Cambridge), near the Dudleys in what is now Harvard Square. In 1637, during the Antinomian Controversy, he was one of the magistrates that sat at the trial of Anne Hutchinson, and voted for her banishment from the colony. In 1639, he was granted land in Salem, near that of John Endecott. He lived there for a time, moving in 1634 to Ipswich before becoming one of the founding settlers of Andover in 1648.

In 1666, his Andover home was destroyed by fire, supposedly because of "the carelessness of the maid". He had varied business interests, speculating in land, and investing with other colonists in a ship involved in the coasting trade. In 1660, he purchased shares in the Atherton Trading Company, a land development company with interests in the "Narragansett Country" (present-day southern Rhode Island). He became one of its leading figures, serving on the management committee, and publishing handbills advertising its lands.

At the time of his death he owned more than 1,500 acres (610 ha) of land in five communities spread across the colony. He was known to own two slaves, a woman named Hannah and her daughter Billah.

To my Dear and Loving Husband (excerpt)

If ever two were one, then surely we;
If ever man were loved by wife, then thee;
If ever wife was happy in a man,
Compare with me, ye women, if you can.
I prize thy love more than whole mines of gold,
Or all the riches that the East doth hold.

— Anne Bradstreet

Bradstreet was heavily involved in colonial politics. When the council met for the first time in Boston, Bradstreet was selected to serve as colonial secretary, a post he would hold until 1644. He was politically moderate, arguing against legislation and judicial decisions punishing people for speaking out against the governing magistrates. Bradstreet was also outspoken in opposition to the witch hysteria that infested his home town of Salem, culminating in numerous trials in 1692.

He served for many years as a commissioner representing Massachusetts to the New England Confederation, an organization that coordinated matters of common interest (principally defense) among most of the New England colonies. He was regularly chosen as an assistant, serving on the council that dominated the public affairs of the colony, but did not reach higher office until 1678, when he was first elected deputy governor under John Leverett. He was against military actions against some of the colony's foreign neighbors, opposing official intervention in a French Acadian dispute in the 1640s, and also spoke against attacking the New Netherland during the First Anglo-Dutch War (1652–1654).

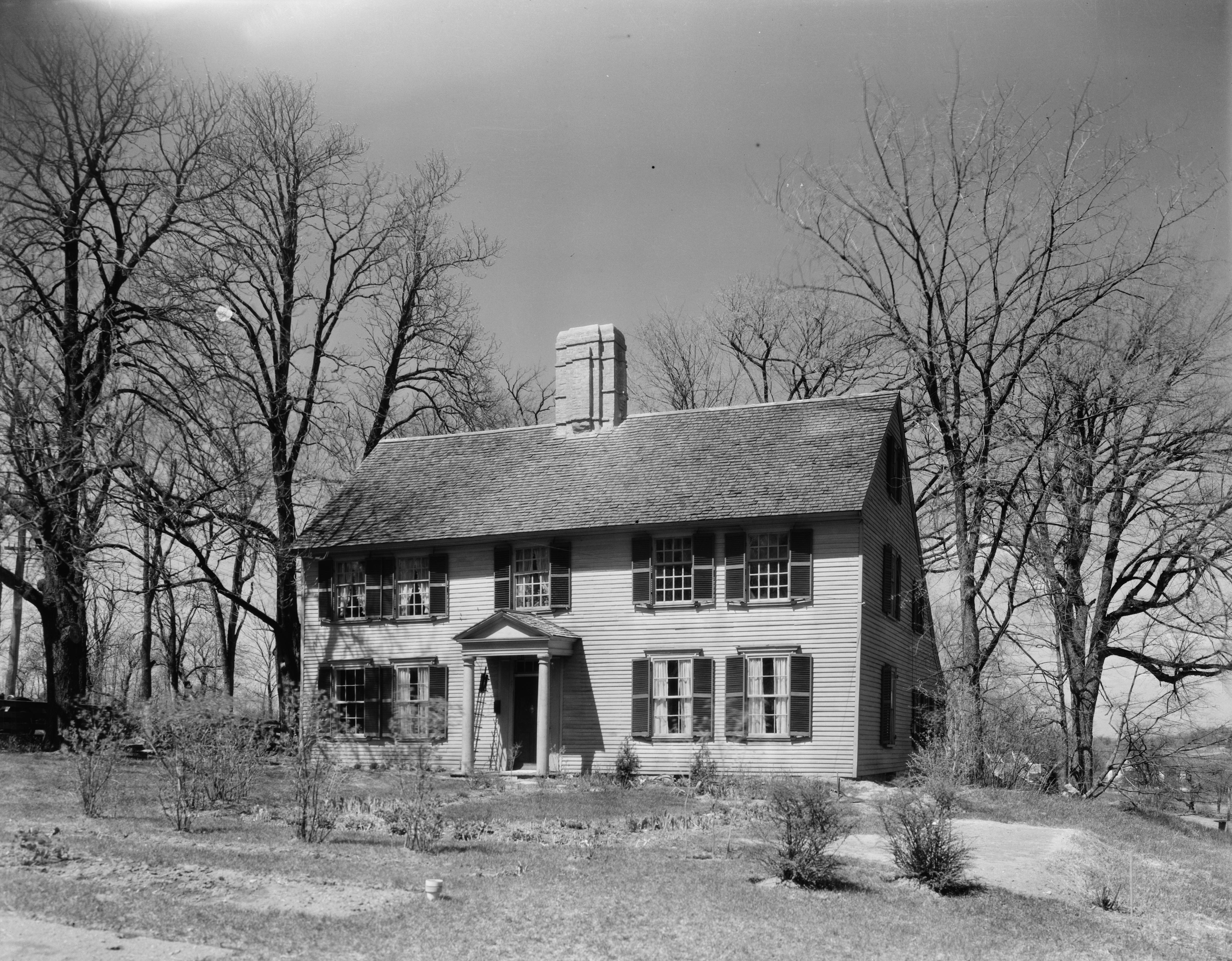
This house (1930s photograph), now located in North Andover, Massachusetts, was thought for many years to belong to the Bradstreets. In the 20th century it was found to have been built in 1715, and is now called the Parson Barnard House.

Bradstreet was sent on a number of diplomatic missions, dealing with settlers, other English colonies, and the Dutch in New Amsterdam. In 1650, he was sent to Hartford, Connecticut, where the Treaty of Hartford was negotiated to determine the boundary between the English colonies and New Amsterdam. In the following years he negotiated an agreement with settlers in York and Kittery to bring them under Massachusetts jurisdiction.

Following the 1660 restoration of Charles II to the throne of England, colonial authorities again became concerned about preserving their charter rights. Bradstreet in 1661 headed a legislative committee to "consider and debate such matters touching their patent rights, and privileges, and duty to his Majesty, as should to them seem proper." The letter the committee drafted reiterated the colony's charter rights, and also included declarations of allegiance and loyalty to the crown. Bradstreet and John Norton were chosen as agents to deliver the letter to London. Charles renewed the charter, but sent the agents back to Massachusetts with a letter attaching conditions to his assent. The colony was expected, among other things, to expand religious tolerance to include the Church of England and religious minorities like the Quakers. The agents were harshly criticized by hardline factions of the legislature, but Bradstreet defended the need to accommodate the king's wishes as the safest course to take.

How to respond to the king's demands divided the colony; Bradstreet was part of the moderate "accommodationist" faction arguing that the colony should obey the king's wishes. This faction lost the debate to the hardline "commonwealth" faction, who were in favor of aggressively maintaining the colony's charter rights, led through the 1660s by governors John Endecott and Richard Bellingham. With Charles distracted by war with the Dutch and domestic politics in the late 1660s, the issue lay dormant until the mid-1670s. Relations between colony and crown deteriorated when the king then renewed demands for legislative and religious reforms, which hardline magistrates again resisted.

== Governor ==
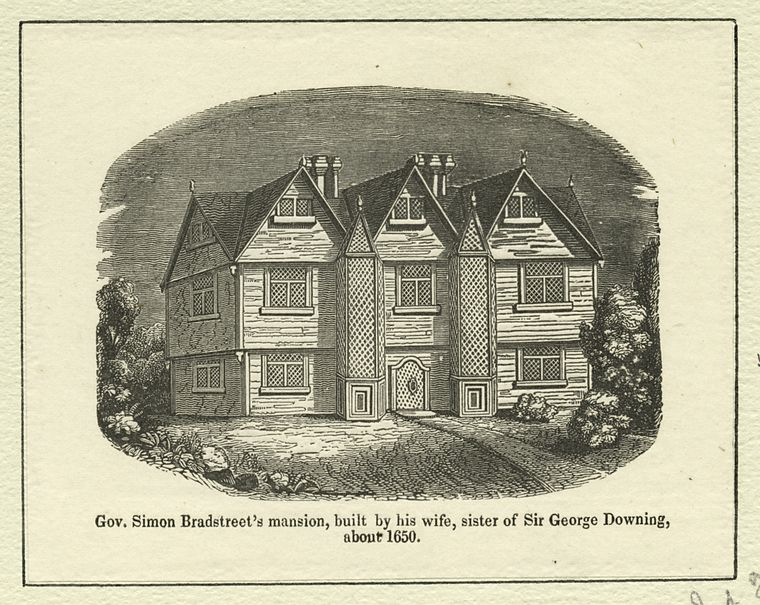
Bradstreet's Salem mansion

In early 1679 Governor John Leverett died, and Bradstreet as deputy succeeded him. Leverett had opposed accommodation of the king's demands, and the change to an accommodationist leadership was too late. Bradstreet would turn out to be the last governor under its original charter. His deputy, Thomas Danforth was from the commonwealth faction. During his tenure, crown agent Edward Randolph was in the colony, attempting to enforce the Navigation Acts, under which certain types of trade involving the colony were illegal. Randolph's enforcement attempts were vigorously resisted by both the merchant classes and sympathetic magistrates despite Bradstreet's attempts to accommodate Randolph. Juries frequently refused to condemn ships accused of violating the acts; in one instance Bradstreet tried three times to get a jury to change its verdict. Randolph's attempts to enforce the navigation laws eventually convinced the colony's general court that it needed to create its own mechanisms for their enforcement. A bill to establish a naval office was vigorously debated in 1681, with the house of deputies, dominated by the commonwealth party, opposing the idea, and the moderate magistrates supporting it. The bill that finally passed was a victory for the commonwealth party, making enforcement difficult and subject to reprisal lawsuits. Bradstreet refused to actually implement the law, and Randolph published open challenges to it. Bradstreet was in some degree vindicated when he won re-election in 1682, and he then used his judicial authority to further undermine the law's effects.

Randolph's threats to report the colonial legislature's intransigence prompted it to dispatch agents to England to argue the colony's case; however, their powers were limited. Shortly after their arrival in late 1682, the Lords of Trade issued an ultimatum to the colony: either grant its agents wider powers, including the ability to negotiate modifications to the charter, or risk having the charter voided. The general court responded by issuing the agents instructions to take a hard line. Following legal processes begun in 1683, the charter was formally annulled on October 23, 1684.

== Dominion, and temporary return as governor ==
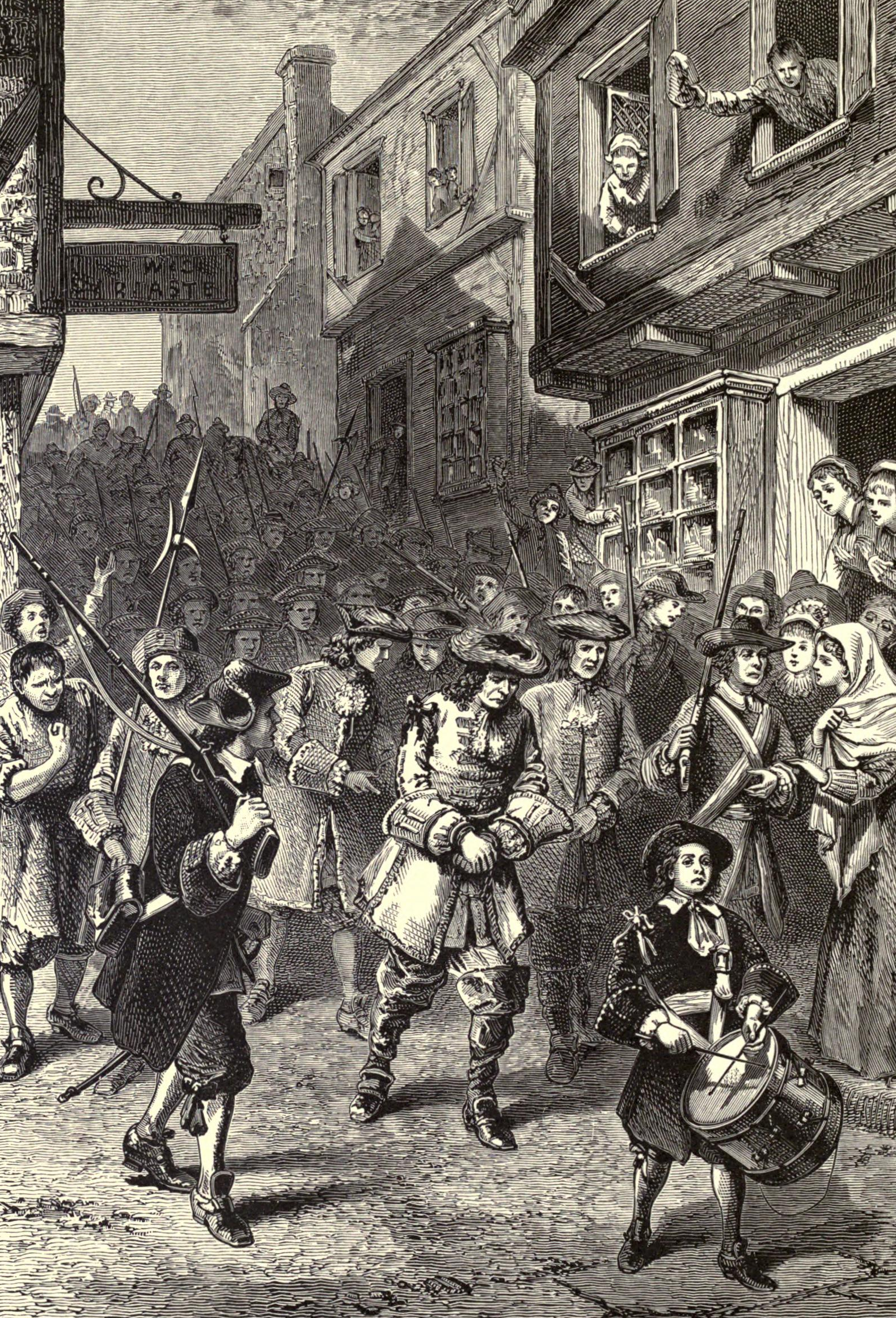
19th century depiction of the arrest of Sir Edmund Andros

King Charles II in 1684 established the Dominion of New England. Bradstreet's brother-in-law Joseph Dudley, who had served as one of the colonial agents, was commissioned by James as President of the Council for New England in 1685 by King James II, and took control of the colony in May 1686. Bradstreet was offered a position on Dudley's council, but refused. Dudley was replaced in December 1686 by Sir Edmund Andros, who came to be greatly detested in Massachusetts for vacating existing land titles, and seizing Congregational church properties for Church of England religious services. Andros' high-handed rule was also unpopular in the other colonies of the dominion.

The idea of revolt against Andros arose as early as January 1689, before news of the December 1688 Glorious Revolution reached Boston. After William III and Mary II took the throne, Increase Mather and Sir William Phips, Massachusetts agents in London, petitioned them and the Lords of Trade for restoration of the Massachusetts charter. Mather furthermore convinced the Lords of Trade to delay notifying Andros of the revolution. He had already dispatched to Bradstreet a letter containing news that a report (prepared before the revolution) stating that the charter had been illegally annulled, and that the magistrates should "prepare the minds of the people for a change." News of the revolution apparently reached some individuals as early as late March, and Bradstreet is one of several possible organizers of the mob that formed in Boston on April 18, 1689. He, along with other pre-Dominion magistrates and some members of Andros' council, addressed an open letter to Andros on that day calling for his surrender in order to quiet the mob. Andros, who had fled to the safety of Castle Island, surrendered, and was eventually returned to England after several months in confinement.

In the wake of Andros' arrest, a council of safety was formed, with Bradstreet as its president. The council drafted a letter to William and Mary, justifying the colony's acts in language similar to that used by William in his proclamations when he invaded England. The council fairly quickly decided to revert to the government as it had been under the old charter. In this form Bradstreet resumed the governorship, and was annually re-elected governor until 1692. He had to defend the colony against those who were opposed to the reintroduction of the old rule, who he characterized in reports to London as malcontents and strangers stirring up trouble. The colony's northern frontier was also engulfed in King William's War, where there was frequent Indian raiding. Bradstreet approved the expeditions of Sir William Phips in 1690 against Acadia and Quebec.

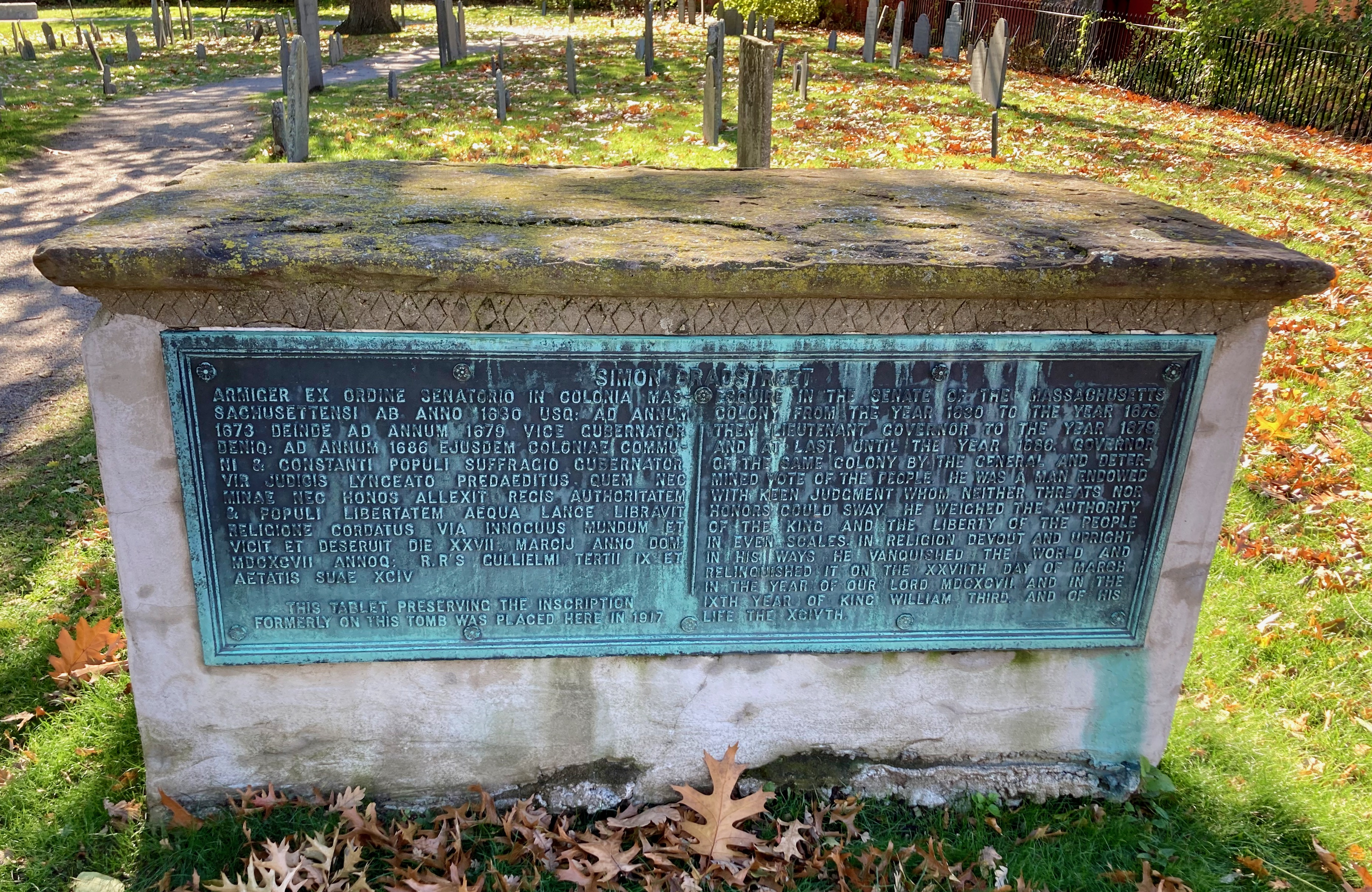
Bradstreet's tomb in Salem

In 1691 William and Mary issued a charter establishing the Province of Massachusetts Bay, and appointed Phips its first governor. Bradstreet was offered a position on Phips' council when the new governor arrived in 1692, but declined. Bradstreet died at his home in Salem on 27 March 1697 at the age of 93; due to his advanced age he was called the "Nestor of New England" by Cotton Mather.

== Family and legacy ==
Bradstreet was buried in the Charter Street Burying Ground in Salem. Poetry by his first wife Anne was published in England in 1650, including verses containing expressions of enduring love for her husband. Anne Bradstreet died in 1672; the couple had eight children, of whom seven survived infancy. Their children included Dudley and John. In 1676 Bradstreet married Ann Gardner, the widow of Captain Joseph Gardner, son of Thomas Gardner of Salem.
