= Anne Bradstreet =

Anglo-American poet (1612–1672)

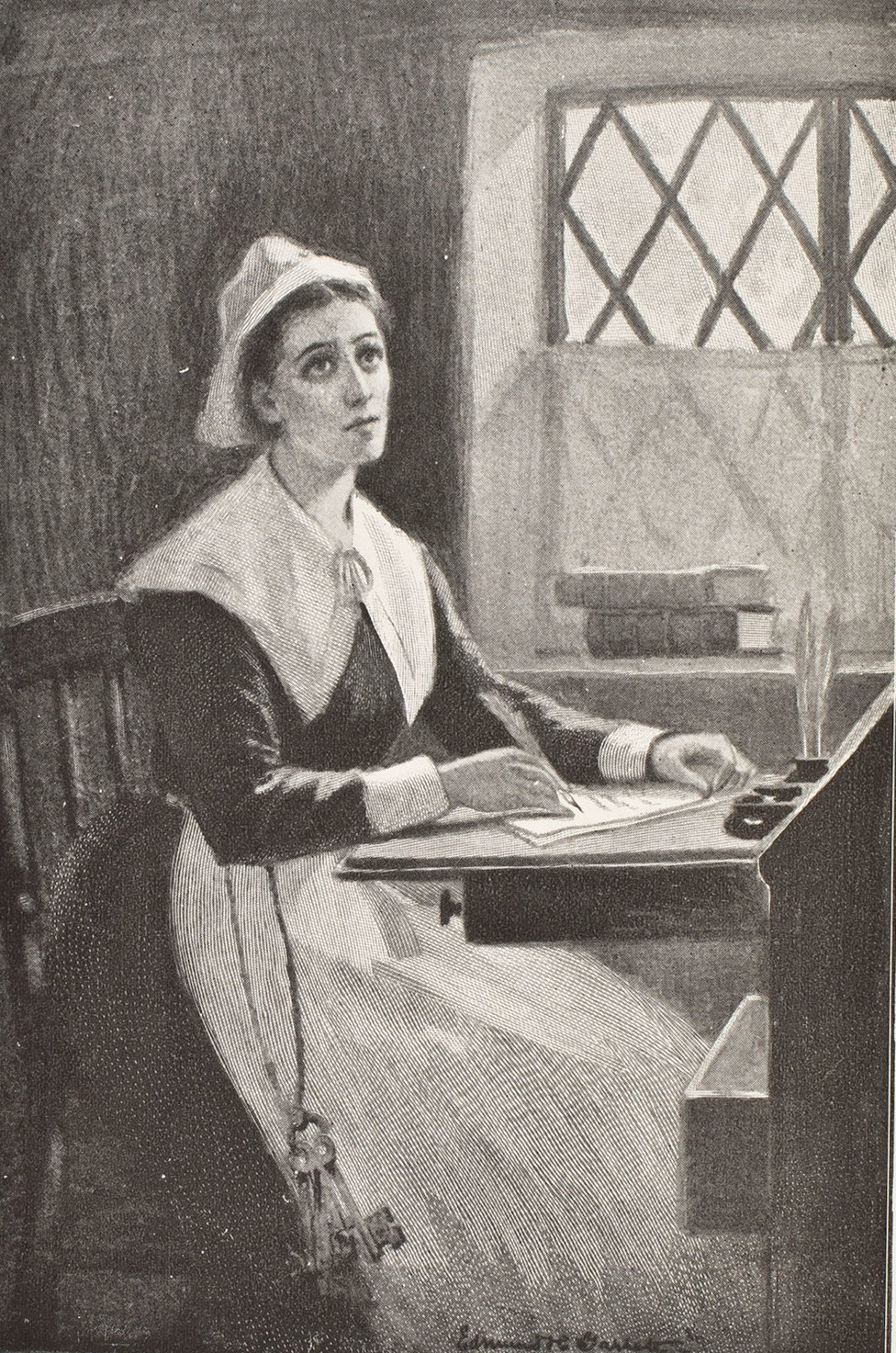
- Nineteenth century depiction of Anne Bradstreet by Edmund H. Garrett. No portrait made during her lifetime exists.
- Born: Anne Dudley; March 8, 1612
- Died: September 16, 1672 (aged 60); North Andover, Massachusetts
- Occupation: poet
- Spouse: Simon Bradstreet (m. 1628)
- Children: 8: Samuel, Dorothy, Sarah, Simon, Hannah, Mercy, Dudley, John.
- Relatives: John Woodbridge (brother-in-law)
- Writing career
- Language: English

Anne Bradstreet (née Dudley; March 8, 1612 – September 16, 1672) was among the most prominent of early English poets of North America and the first writer in England's North American colonies to be published. She is the first Puritan figure in American literature and notable for her large corpus of poetry, as well as personal writings published posthumously.

Born to a wealthy Puritan family in Northampton, England, Bradstreet was a well-read scholar especially affected by the works of Du Bartas. She was married at sixteen, and her parents and young family migrated at the time of the founding of Massachusetts Bay Colony in 1630. A mother of eight children and the wife and daughter of public officials in New England, Bradstreet wrote poetry in addition to her other duties.

Her early works are less distinctive, but her later writings developed into her unique style of poetry which centers on her role as a mother, her struggles with the sufferings of life, and her Puritan faith. While her works were initially considered primarily of historical significance, she reached posthumous acclaim in the 20th century. Her first collection, The Tenth Muse Lately Sprung Up in America, was widely read in America and England.

== Background ==
Bradstreet is described as "an educated English woman, a kind, loving wife, devoted mother, Empress Consort of Massachusetts, a questing Puritan and a sensitive poet."

Bradstreet's first volume of poetry was The Tenth Muse Lately Sprung Up in America, published in 1650. It was met with a positive reception in both the Old World and the New World.

=== Life ===
Anne was born in Comton, England in 1612, the daughter of Thomas Dudley, a steward of the Earl of Lincoln, and Dorothy Yorke.

Due to her family's position, she grew up in cultured circumstances and was a well-educated woman for her time, being tutored in history, several languages, and literature. At the age of sixteen she married Simon Bradstreet. Both Anne's father and husband were later to serve as governors of the Massachusetts Bay Colony. Anne and Simon, along with Anne's parents, emigrated to America aboard the Arbella as part of the Winthrop Fleet of Puritan emigrants in 1630.

She first came to the Americas on June 14, 1630, at what is now Pioneer Village in Salem, Massachusetts, with Simon, her parents, and other voyagers as part of the Puritan migration to New England. Upon their arrival, they found that many of the colonists had died from illness or starvation the previous winter. Her family shared a one-room house with very little furniture or supplies.

The Bradstreet family soon moved again, this time to what is now Cambridge, Massachusetts. In 1632, Anne had her first child, Samuel, in "Newe Towne," as it was then called. Despite poor health, she had eight children and achieved a comfortable social standing. Having previously been afflicted with smallpox as a teenager in England, Anne would once again fall prey to illness as paralysis overtook her joints in later years. In the early 1640s, Simon once again pressed his wife, pregnant with her sixth child, to move for the sixth time, from Ipswich, Massachusetts, to Andover Parish. North Andover is that original town founded in 1646 by the Stevens, Osgood, Johnson, Farnum, Barker, and Bradstreet families, among others. Anne and her family resided in the Old Center of what is now North Andover, Massachusetts.

Both Anne's father and her husband were instrumental in the founding of Harvard University in 1636; her father was a founder, and her husband an overseer. Two of her sons, Samuel (class of 1653) and Simon (c/o 1660), were graduates. In October 1997, the Harvard community dedicated a gate in memory of her as America's first published poet. The gate was dedicated on the 25th anniversary of women being allowed in the Harvard Yard dorms. The Bradstreet Gate is located next to Canaday Hall in Harvard Yard.

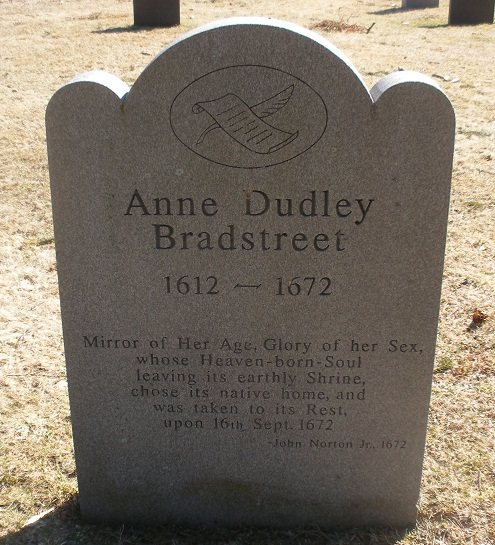
Memorial marker for Anne Bradstreet in the Old North Parish Burial Ground, North Andover, Massachusetts

In 1650, Rev. John Woodbridge had The Tenth Muse Lately Sprung Up in America composed by "A Gentlewoman from Those Parts" published in London, making Anne the first female poet ever published in both England and the New World. On July 10, 1666, their North Andover family home burned (see "Works" below) in a fire that left the Bradstreets homeless and with few personal belongings. Recent archaeological excavation may have located the site of this homestead, which had been the subject of uncertainty over the centuries. By then, Anne's health was slowly failing. She suffered from tuberculosis and had to deal with the loss of cherished relatives. But her will remained strong and as a reflection of her religious devotion and knowledge of the Bible, she found peace in the firm belief that her daughter-in-law Mercy and her grandchildren were in heaven.

Anne Bradstreet died on September 16, 1672, in North Andover, Massachusetts, at the age of 60. The precise location of her grave is uncertain but many historians believe her body is in the Old Burying Ground at Academy Road and Osgood Street in North Andover. In 1676, four years after the death of Anne, Simon Bradstreet married for a second time to a woman also named Anne (Gardiner). In 1697, Simon died and was buried in Salem. This area of the Merrimack Valley is today described as "The Valley of the Poets."

A marker in the North Andover cemetery commemorates the 350th anniversary (2000) of the publishing of The Tenth Muse in London in 1650. That site and the Bradstreet Gate at Harvard, the memorial and pamphlets inside the Ipswich Public Library in Ipswich, MA, as well as the Bradstreet Kindergarten in North Andover may be the only places in America honoring her memory. The SS Anne Bradstreet, a Liberty Ship built in World War II, was named for her.

== Writing ==
=== Background ===
Anne Bradstreet's education gave her advantages that allowed her to write with authority about politics, history, medicine, and theology. Her personal library of books was said to have numbered over 800, although many were destroyed when her home burned down. This event itself inspired a poem titled "Upon the Burning of Our House July 10th, 1666". At first, she rejects the anger and grief that this worldly tragedy has caused her; she looks toward God and the assurance of heaven as consolation, saying:

And when I could no longer look,
I blest His grace that gave and took,
That laid my goods now in the dust.
Yea, so it was, and so 'twas just.
It was his own; it was not mine.
Far be it that I should repine.

However, in opposition to her Puritan ways, she also shows her human side, expressing the pain this event had caused her, that is, until the poem comes to its end:

Farewell my pelf; farewell my store.
The world no longer let me love
My hope, and treasure lies above.

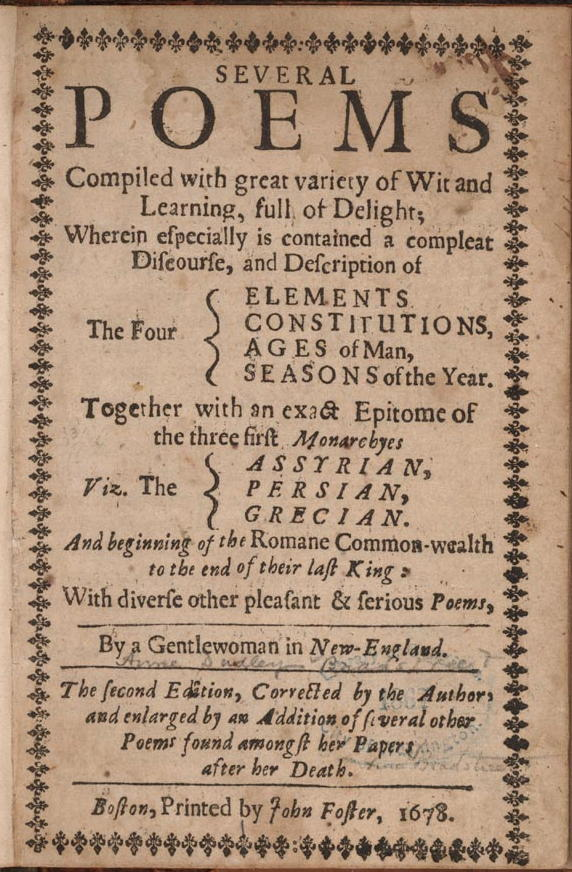
Title page, second (posthumous) edition of Bradstreet's poems, 1678

As a younger poet, Bradstreet wrote five quaternions, epic poems of four parts each (see works below) that explore the diverse yet complementary natures of their subject. Much of Bradstreet's poetry is based on observation of the world around her, focusing heavily on domestic and religious themes, and was considered by Cotton Mather "a monument to her memory beyond the stateliest marble". Long considered primarily of historical interest, she won critical acceptance in the 20th century as a writer of enduring verse, particularly for her sequence of religious poems "Contemplations", which was written for her family and not published until the mid-19th century.

Nearly a century later, Martha Wadsworth Brewster, a notable 18th-century American poet and writer, in her principal work, Poems on Diverse Subjects, was influenced and pays homage to Bradstreet's verse.

Despite the traditional attitude toward women of the time, she clearly valued knowledge and intellect; she was a free thinker and some consider her an early feminist; unlike the more radical Anne Hutchinson, however, Bradstreet's feminism does not reflect heterodox, antinomian views.

Her Victories in foreign Coasts resound?
Ships more invincible than Spain's, her foe
She rack't, she sack'd, she sunk his Armadoe.
Her stately Troops advanc'd to Lisbon's wall,
Don Anthony in's right for to install.
She frankly help'd Franks' (brave) distressed King,
The States united now her fame do sing.

In 1647, Bradstreet's brother-in-law, Rev. John Woodbridge, sailed to England, carrying her manuscript of poetry. Although Anne later said that she did not know Woodbridge was going to publish her manuscript, in her self-deprecatory poem, ""The Author to Her Book"", she wrote Woodbridge a letter while he was in London, indicating her knowledge of the publication plan. Anne had little choice, however—as a woman poet, it was important for her to downplay her ambitions as an author. Otherwise, she would have faced criticism for being "unwomanly." Anne's first work was published in London as The Tenth Muse Lately Sprung Up in America "by a Gentlewoman of those Parts".

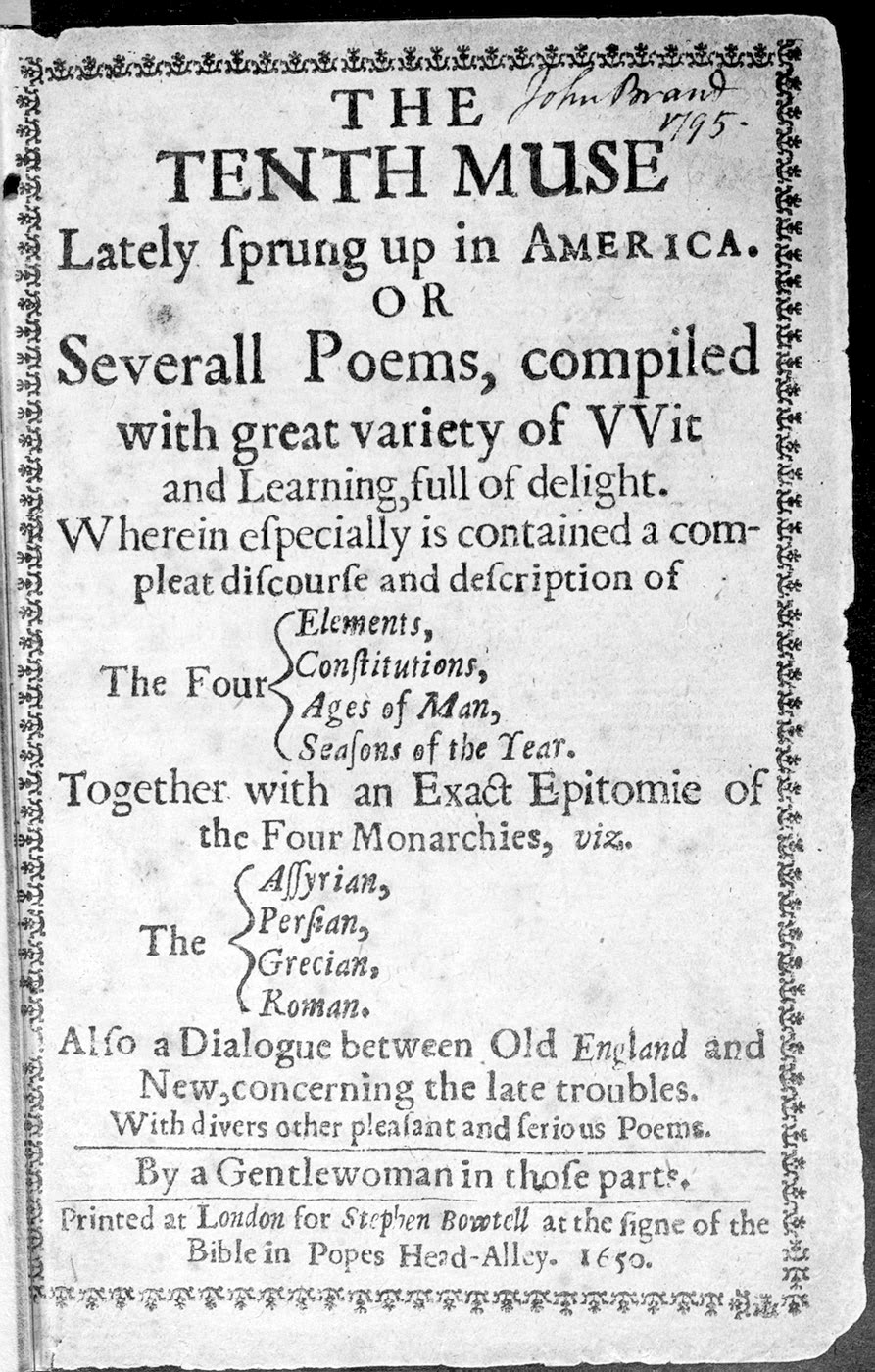
Title page, The Tenth Muse Lately Sprung Up in America, printed at London, 1650

The purpose of the publication appears to have been an attempt by devout Puritan men (i.e. Thomas Dudley, Simon Bradstreet, John Woodbridge) to show that a godly and educated woman could elevate her position as a wife and mother, without necessarily placing her in competition with men. In 1678, her self-revised Several Poems Compiled with Great Variety of Wit and Learning was posthumously published in America, and included one of her most famous poems, "To My Dear and Loving Husband". This volume is owned by the Stevens Memorial Library of North Andover and resides in the Houghton Library vault at Harvard.

A quotation from Bradstreet can be found on a plaque at the Bradstreet Gate in Harvard Yard: "I came into this Country, where I found a new World and new manners at which my heart rose." Unfortunately the plaque seems to be based on a misinterpretation; the following sentence is "But after I was convinced it was the way of God, I submitted to it and joined to the church at Boston." This suggests her heart rose up in protest rather than in joy.

=== Role of women ===
Marriage played a large role in the lives of Puritan women. In Bradstreet's poem, "To My Dear And Loving Husband," she reveals that she is one with her husband. "If ever two were one, then surely we." The Puritans believed marriage to be a gift from God. In another of Bradstreet's works, "Before the Birth of One of Her Children", Bradstreet acknowledges God's gift of marriage in the lines, "And if I see not half my days that's due, what nature would, God grant to yours, and you".

Throughout "Letter to Her Husband, Absent upon Public Employment," Bradstreet states how she feels lost when her husband is not around and that life is always better when he is around. In Bradstreet's poems, it can be assumed she truly loved her husband and missed him when he was away from her and the family. Bradstreet does not resent her husband for leaving her with the family and with all of the household needs; she just misses him and wants him back with her.

Various works of Bradstreet are dedicated to her children. In works such as "Before the Birth of One of Her Children" and "In Reference to Her Children", Bradstreet articulated the love that she has for her children, both unborn and born. In Puritan society, children were also gifts from God, and she loved and cared for all of her children just as she loved and cared for her husband. She always believes they too are bound with her to make "one."

=== Reception ===
As writing was not considered to be an acceptable role for women at the time, Bradstreet was met with criticism. One of the most prominent figures of her time, John Winthrop, criticized Ann Hopkins, wife of prominent Connecticut colony governor Edward Hopkins. He mentioned in his journal that Hopkins should have kept to being a housewife and left writing and reading for men, "whose minds are stronger." Despite heavy criticism of women during her time, Bradstreet continued to write, which led to the belief that she was interested in rebelling against societal norms of the time. A prominent minister of the time, Thomas Parker, was also against the idea of women writing and sent a letter to his own sister saying that publishing a book was outside of the realm of what women were supposed to do. No doubt he was opposed to the writing of Bradstreet as well. These negative views were likely augmented by the fact that Puritan ideologies stated that women were vastly inferior to men.

== Literary style and themes ==
=== Background ===
Bradstreet was using her imagination and past experience through her poems about learning, benefits of praising God with inquiring mind and sensitive, philosophical vision.

We see examples of this homesick imagination in her poem "Dialogue Between Old England and New" which emphasizes the relationship between the motherland and the colonies as parental; and gives assurance that the bond between the two countries will continue. It also implies that whatever happens to England will also affect America. The poem often refers to England as "mother" and America as "Daughter", which emphasizes the bond Bradstreet feels herself to her home country.

Alas, dear Mother, fairest Queen and best,
With honour, wealth, and peace happy and blest,
What ails thee hang thy head, and cross thine arms,
And sit i' the dust to sigh these sad alarms?
What deluge of new woes thus over-whelm
The glories of thy ever famous Realm?
What means this wailing tone, this mournful guise?
Ah, tell thy Daughter; she may sympathize.

=== Intended readership ===
Anne Bradstreet's works tend to be directed to members of her family and are generally intimate. For instance, in Bradstreet's "To My Dear and Loving Husband", the poem's intended audience is her husband, Simon Bradstreet. In "A Letter to Her Husband Absent upon Public Employment" Bradstreet writes a letter to her husband who is away from her working at his job. Bradstreet uses various metaphors to describe her husband. The most visible use of metaphor that Bradstreet uses is comparing her husband to the seasons. When summer is gone, winter soon arrives. Summer can be seen as a time of happiness and warmth. Winter on the other hand can be seen as being gloomy and cold. Bradstreet's husband is her Sun and when he is with her it is always summer. She is happy and warm from the love that her husband brings when he is around. When her husband leaves home for work, everything then becomes winter. It is a sad, cold time for Bradstreet and she wishes for her husband to soon return. "Return, return, sweet Sol, from Capricorn." She wants her husband to know that she needs him and without him everything feels gloomy. She is not concerned with what others think. It is not intended for anyone else except her husband. Bradstreet knows that the situation is inevitable, summer can't be around always and soon winter will follow. Her husband's job is important. He can't be there always and he must go away at times. "Till nature's sad decree shall call thee hence."

Puritan women were required to attend worship services, yet they could not to speak or offer prayer. Women were also not allowed to attend town meetings or be involved in the decisions that were discussed.

Bradstreet was not responsible for her writing becoming public. Bradstreet's brother-in-law, John Woodbridge, sent her work off to be published. Bradstreet was a righteous woman and her poetry was not meant to bring attention to herself.

=== Themes ===
The role of women is a common subject found in Bradstreet's poems. Living in a Puritan society, Bradstreet did not approve of the stereotypical idea that women were inferior to men during the 1600s. Women were expected to spend all their time cooking, cleaning, taking care of their children, and attending to their husband's every need. In her poem "In Honour of that High and Mighty Princess Queen Elizabeth of Happy Memory," Bradstreet questions this belief.

"Now say, have women worth? or have they none? Or had they some, but with our queen is't gone? Nay Masculines, you have thus taxt us long, But she, though dead, will vindicate our wrong, Let such as say our Sex is void of Reason, Know tis a Slander now, but once was Treason."

Another recurring subject in Bradstreet's work is mortality. In many of her works, she writes about her death and how it will affect her children and others in her life. The recurrence of this mortality theme can be viewed as autobiographical. Because her work was not intended for the public, she was referring to her own medical problems and her belief that she would die. In addition to her medical history (smallpox and partial paralysis), Bradstreet and her family dealt with a major house fire that left them homeless and devoid of all personal belongings. She hoped her children would think of her fondly and honor her memory in her poem, "Before the Birth of One of Her Children." "If any worth or virtue were in me, Let that live freshly in thy memory."

Bradstreet is also known for using her poetry as a means to question her own Puritan beliefs; her doubt concerning God's mercy and her struggles to continue to place her faith in him are exemplified in such poems as "Verses upon the Burning of our House" and "In Memory of My Dear Grandchild". Her works demonstrate a conflict that many Puritans would not have felt comfortable discussing, let alone writing.

In "The Prologue," Bradstreet demonstrates how society trivialized the accomplishments of women. The popular belief that women should be doing other things like sewing, rather than writing poetry.

"I am obnoxious to each carping tongue Who says my hand a needle better fits, A poet's pen all scorn I should thus wrong. For such despite they cast on female wits: If what I do prove well, it won't advance, They'll say it's stol'n, or else it was by chance."

In "To My Dear and Loving Husband," Bradstreet confesses her undying love for Simon saying "Thy love is such I can no way repay, The heavens reward thee manifold, I pray." Her deep passions can be found again in "A Letter to Her Husband, Absent upon Public Employment." Her overt affections for her husband help readers to understand Bradstreet's temerity.

Anne Bradstreet wrote in a different format than other writers of her time. This mainly is due to the fact that she wrote her feelings in a book not knowing someone would read them. In her poem "A letter to my Husband" she speaks about the loss of her husband when he is gone.

"I like the earth this season morn in black, my sun is gone." Here Anne is expressing her feelings of missing her husband when he is away.

"To my faults that well you know I have let be interred in my oblivious grave; if any worth of virtue were in me, let that live freshly in they memory". Anne expresses the feeling she has of wanting her children to remember her in a good light not in a bad light.

=== Tone ===
Bradstreet often used a sarcastic tone in her poetry. In the first stanza of "The Prologue" she claims "for my mean pen are too superior things" referring to society's belief that she is unfit to write about wars and the founding of cities because she is a woman. In stanza five Bradstreet continues to display irony by stating "who says my hand a needle better fits". This is another example of her sarcastic voice because society during this time expected women to perform household chores rather than write poetry.

Although Anne Bradstreet endured many hardships in her life, her poems are usually written in a hopeful and positive tone. Throughout her poem In "Memory of My Dear Grandchild Simon Bradstreet," she mentions that even though she has lost her grandson in this world, she will one day be reunited with him in Heaven. In "Upon the Burning of Our House," Bradstreet describes her house in flames but selflessly declares "there's wealth enough, I need no more." Although Bradstreet lost many of her material items she kept a positive attitude and found strength through her belief in God.

=== Quaternions ===
Bradstreet wrote four quaternions, "Seasons," "Elements," "Humours," and "Ages," which made possible her "development as a poet in terms of technical craftsmanship as she learned to fashion the form artistically."

Bradstreet's first two quaternions were her most successful. The central tension in her work is that between delight in the world and belief of its vanity.

== Selected works ==
- Before the Birth of One of Her Children
- A Dialogue between Old England and New
- A Letter to Her Husband, Absent upon Public Employment
- Another
- Another (II)
- For Deliverance From A Fever
- Deliverance from Another Sore Fit
- Contemplations (poem)
- In Honour of that High and Mighty Princess, Queen Elizabeth
- In Reference to her Children, 23 June 1659
- The Author to Her Book
- The Flesh and the Spirit
- The Four Ages of Man (quaternion)
- Four Seasons of the Year (quaternion)
- Four Elements (quaternion)
- Of The Four Ages of Man (quaternion)
- The Four Monarchies (quaternion)
- The Prologue
- To Her Father with Some Verses
- To My Dear and Loving Husband
- Upon a Fit of Sickness, Anno 1632 Aetatis Suae, 19
- Upon My Son Samuel His Going For England, November 6, 1657
- Upon Some Distemper of Body
- Verses upon the Burning of our House
- The Tenth Muse Lately Sprung Up in America (1650) and, from the Manuscripts. Meditations Divine and Morall, Letters, and Occasional Poems, Facsimile ed., 1965, Scholars' Facsimiles & Reprints, ISBN 978-0-8201-1006-6.
- An Exact Epitome of the Three First Monarchies (1650) (a.k.a. Exact Epitome of the Four Monarchies)
- In Memory of My Dear Grandchild Elizabeth Bradstreet, Who Deceased August, 1665, Being a Year and Half Old
