= Waldron =

Waldron may refer to:

== People ==
- Waldron (surname)
- Waldron Fox-Decent (1937–2019), Canadian academic and political scientist
- Waldron Smithers (1880–1954), British politician
- Mal Waldron (1925–2002), American jazz pianist, composer and arranger
- Adelbert Waldron (1933–1995), US Army sniper (Vietnam-era; most confirmed kills until 2011)
- Jeremy Waldron (born 1953), New Zealand legal and political philosopher
- John C. Waldron (1900-1942), American naval pilot who died leading a squadron in the Battle of Midway

== Places ==
=== United States ===
- Waldron, Arkansas, a city
- Aroma Park, Illinois, a village formerly known as Waldron
- Waldron, Indiana, an unincorporated community
- Waldron, Kansas, a city
- Waldron, Michigan, a village
- Waldron, Missouri, an unincorporated community
- Waldron, Washington, an unincorporated community also known as Waldron Island
- Waldron Ledge, Hawaii, which overlooks Kīlauea Caldera
- Waldron Shale, Indiana, a geologic formation
- Waldron Trail, a hiking trail on the South Rim of the Grand Canyon in Arizona

=== Antarctica ===
- Cape Waldron, Wilkes Land
- Mount Waldron, Ellsworth Mountains, Ellsworth Land
- Waldron Spurs, Ross Dependency
- Waldron Glacier, Wilkes Land

=== Elsewhere ===
- Waldron, East Sussex, England
- Waldron, Saskatchewan, Canada, a community
- Waldron Cutting, a geological site in East Sussex, England
- Namotu, an island in Fiji with the dual names of Namotu and Waldron

== Other uses ==
- Waldron High School (disambiguation), multiple high schools
- Waldron School District, Scott County, Arkansas, United States
- The Waldron, NHS building in Lewisham, London, England
- USS Waldron (DD-699), a US Navy destroyer commissioned in 1944
- The Waldron War, an 1870s conflict in Reconstruction-era Arkansas
