= Burn (surname) =

Burn is a surname, and may refer to:

- Amos Burn (1848–1925), English chess player
- Andrew Burn (1864–1927), English Anglican cleric, Dean of Salisbury
- Andrew Burn (professor) (born 1954), English academic and media theorist
- Arthur Burn (1879–1911), Canadian long-distance runner
- Clive Burn (1882–1955), British official
- Chris Burn, British-Canadian geomorphologist
- Dan Burn (born 1992), English footballer
- David Burn (1799–1875), Scottish playwright in Australia and New Zealand
- Doris Burn (1923–2011), American children's book author and illustrator
- Edmund Burn (1922–1969), Canadian cricketer
- Edward Burn (cleric) (1762–1837), English Calvinist Methodist preacher
- Edward Burn (legal scholar) (1922–2019), English barrister
- Flora Burn (fl.1741), American pirate
- George Burn (1759–c.1820), Scottish civil engineer and architect
- Gordon Burn (1948–2009), English writer
- Gordon Burn-Wood (1914–1981), South African competitive sailor
- Hans Burn, Swiss paralympic skier
- Harry T. Burn (1895–1977), American politician from Tennessee
- Hilary Burn (born 1946), English wildlife illustrator
- Ian Burn (1939–1993), Australian conceptual artist
- James Burn (born 1849), Australian cricketer
- James Dawson Burn (c.1809–1889), Irish author, vagrant and Odd Fellow
- Jane Burn (born 1973), British ballerina
- Jim Burn, American attorney and politician from Pennsylvania
- Jimmy Burn (1877–1934), Australian rules footballer
- John Burn (bishop) (1851–1896), Anglican colonial bishop
- John Burn (geneticist) (born 1952), British geneticist and academic
- John Burn (rower) (1884–1958), English doctor and rower
- John Southerden Burn (1798–1870), English solicitor and antiquary
- Johnnie Burn (born 1970), British film sound designer
- Jonny Burn (born 1995), English footballer
- Joseph Burn (1871–1950), British insurance executive
- Joshua Harold Burn (1892–1981), English pharmacologist
- June Burn (1893–1969), American non-fiction writer and columnist
- Kathleen Pelham Burn (1887–1966), British aviator and sportswoman
- Kenneth Burn (1862–1956), Australian cricketer
- Micky Burn (1912–2010), English journalist and commando
- Natalie Burn, American actress and screenwriter
- Malcolm Burn (born 1960), Canadian music producer
- Margaret Gordon Burn (1825–1918), New Zealand school principal
- Paul Burn (born 1963), English cricketer
- Richard Burn (1709–1785), English legal writer
- Richard Burn (Indologist) (1871–1947), English historian of India
- Robert Burn (architect) (1752–1815), Scottish architect, father of William Burn
- Robert Burn (classicist) (1829–1904), English classical scholar and archaeologist
- Robert Burn (naturalist) (born 1937), Australian naturalist and citizen scientist
- Robert Scott Burn (1825–1901), Scottish engineer and author
- Rodney Joseph Burn (1899–1984), English artist
- Roland Burn (born 1950), Swiss biathlete
- Tam Dean Burn (born 1958), Scottish actor
- Thomas Burn (1888–1976), English footballer
- Thomas Henry Burn (1875–1949), British politician
- Wendy Burn (born 1958), British psychiatrist
- William Burn (1789–1870), Scottish architect
- William Pelham Burn (1859–1901), English Anglican priest, Archdeacon of Norfolk
- William Wallace Allison Burn (1891–1915), New Zealand aviator

== See also ==
- Burne
- Burns (surname)
- Byrne (surname)
- Bern (surname)
- Born (surname)
