= Waldron (surname) =

Waldron is a surname. Notable people with the surname include:

- Adelaide Cilley Waldron (1843-1909), American author, editor, clubwoman
- Adelbert Waldron (1933-1995), United States Army sniper
- Alfred M. Waldron, United States politician
- Daniel Waldron, last holder of extensive Waldron real estate in Dover, New Hampshire
- Duncan Waldron, astronomer and photographer
- Henry Waldron, United States politician
- Irv Waldron, baseball player
- John Waldron (disambiguation), several people, including
  - John C. Waldron, United States Navy aviator
- Jeremy Waldron, legal philosopher
- Kathleen Waldron, president of Baruch College of the City University of New York
- Lamar Waldron, American writer
- Mal Waldron, composer and pianist
- Matt Waldron, American baseball player
- Michael Waldron, American screenwriter and producer
- Pershing Waldron, Dominican politician, Speaker of the House of Assembly
- Major Richard Waldron, second "president" of Colonial New Hampshire
- Richard Waldron (colonel), prominent officeholder in colonial New Hampshire
- Richard Waldron (Secretary), leading opponent of the Wentworth oligarchy in colonial New Hampshire
- Richard Russell Waldron, purser and special agent to the Wilkes Expedition
- Thomas Westbrook Waldron, Militia captain at siege of Louisburg (1745), royal New Hampshire councillor, patriot
- Thomas Westbrook Waldron (consul), first U.S. consul to Hong Kong, captain's secretary to the Wilkes Expedition

Fictional characters:

- Connell Waldron, character in the Irish TV series Normal People, based on the novel Normal People
- Sam Waldron, character in the British children's TV series Postman Pat
