= Heathfield and Waldron =

Parish in East Sussex, England

Coordinates: 50.97°N 0.26°E

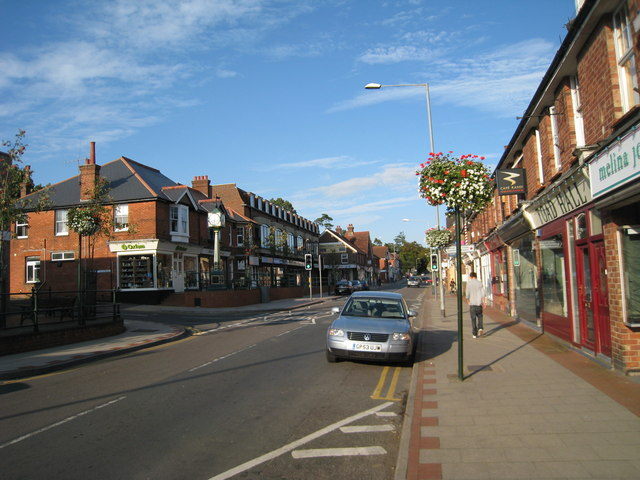
- Heathfield High Street

- Location within East Sussex
- Area: 52.8 km^{2} (20.4 sq mi)
- Population: 11,913 (2011)
  - Density: 565/sq mi (218/km^{2})
- OS grid reference: TQ586209
  - London: 40 miles (64 km) NNW
- District: Wealden
- Shire county: East Sussex
- Region: South East
- Country: England
- Sovereign state: United Kingdom
- Post town: HEATHFIELD
- Postcode district: TN21
- Dialling code: 01435
- Police: Sussex
- Fire: East Sussex
- Ambulance: South East Coast
- UK Parliament: Bexhill and Battle
- Website: http://www.hwpc.org.uk/

Heathfield and Waldron is a civil parish within the Wealden District of East Sussex, England. Heathfield is surrounded by the High Weald Area of Outstanding Natural Beauty. The parish was formed on 1 April 1999 from "Heathfield" and "Waldron" parishes.

== Governance ==
The civil parish council has twenty one elected members representing four wards: Cross-in-Hand ward (three members); Heathfield East ward (two); Heathfield ward (fourteen); Waldron (two). The current (2016) chairman is Mr Andy Woolley. Huw Merriman is the Member of Parliament for the Battle and Bexhill Constituency, which includes Heathfield.

The Heathfield Partnership, a voluntary group was set up in 1995 "to identify options for developing the town and the local villages".

== Settlements in the parish ==
=== Heathfield ===
Heathfield town, the principal settlement in the parish, stands at the junction of two roads: the A265 road from Hawkhurst and the A267 road linking Royal Tunbridge Wells with Eastbourne.

=== Waldron ===
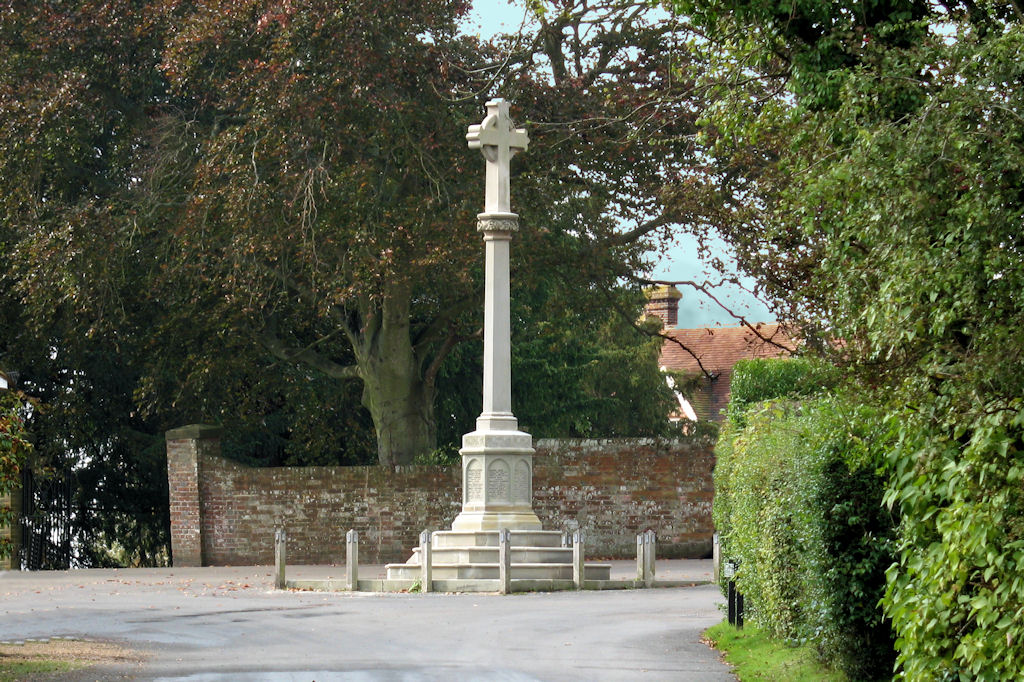
War memorial at Waldron

Waldron is a village located to the west of Heathfield. The 12th-century parish church is dedicated to All Saints.

Foxhunt Manor at Waldron dates from 1898. It was built by Joseph Lucas Junior, and later sold to the Oakshott family. In 1935 the estate was purchased by the Xaverian Brothers, when it was run as a preparatory boarding school. The school closed in 1959 when it was purchased by the Order of The Visitation.

=== Cross-in-Hand ===
Cross-in-Hand is a small village west of Heathfield.

=== Others ===
Broad Oak, Punnetts Town, Little London and Cade Street are other villages within the parish.

== Natural environment ==
There are six Sites of Special Scientific Interest within the parish. Bingletts Wood and Heathfield Park are areas of woodland with a flowing ravine (ghyll woodland). The two sites are of biological interest, hosting a wide variety of fauna, much of which is uncommon in the south-east of England. Paines Cross Meadow, Sapperton Meadows and St. Dunstan's Farm Meadows also have SSSI status. These sites consist mainly of wet meadowland and are of biological interest, hosting a wide variety of fauna. The final SSSI is Waldron Cutting, a small cutting along the lane between Waldron and Horam, which is of geological interest. Its sandstone bedrock containing samples of fossilised Lycopodites.

== Twin towns ==
- Forges-les-Eaux, France
