= Richard Waldron (disambiguation) =

Richard Waldron (1615–1689) was the second president of colonial New Hampshire.

Richard Waldron may also refer to:

- Richard Waldron (colonel) (1650–1730), prominent officeholder in colonial New Hampshire
- Richard Waldron (secretary) (1694–1753), leading opponent of the Wentworth oligarchy in colonial New Hampshire
- Richard Russell Waldron (1803–1846), purser and special agent to the Wilkes Expedition
