= Daniel Waldron =

American merchant in New Hampshire

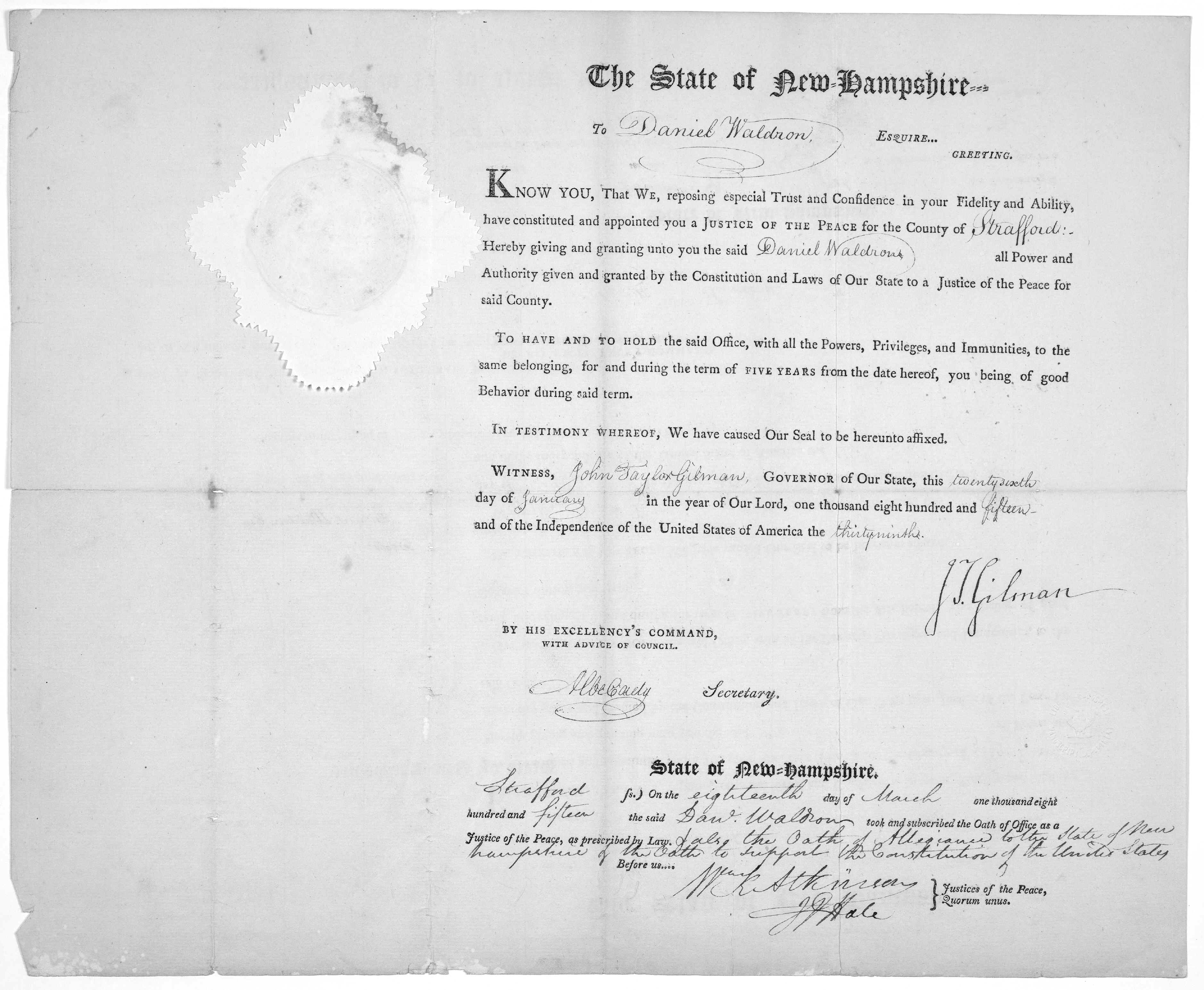
- Waldron's commission as Justice of the Peace
- Born: November 9, 1775
- Died: January 29, 1821 (aged 45); Dover, New Hampshire
- Occupations: merchant, Justice of the Peace, mill owner
- Spouse: Olive Sheafe
- Children: Richard Russell Waldron, Nathaniel Sheafe Waldron, Charles, Mary Constantia, Daniel, Olive, Edmund Quincy Sheafe Waldron, Thomas Westbrook Waldron
- Parent(s): Thomas Westbrook Waldron and Constance Davis

Daniel Waldron was an American merchant and mill owner. He was the fifth and last generation of his family to hold the substantial Waldron estate in Dover, New Hampshire. With his bankruptcy, Dover realized a new life and economy as a center of textile manufacturing.

== Birth and inheritance ==
Daniel was born November 9, 1775, the youngest son of Thomas Westbrook Waldron and Constance Davis. At the age of three he was designated one of two co heirs to the majority of the family property in downtown Dover, New Hampshire, passing over oldest brother William. "By the death of his brother Charles (in 1791) he became, under the terms of their father's will, sole owner of the bulk of the Dover property." Daniel's children in turn inherited some of the heirlooms of the family, including Father Rasle's strongbox, a collection of papers belonging to grandfather Richard Waldron (Secretary), and the family portraits.

== Family ==
"Daniel married 5 June 1802, Olive Rindge Sheafe, who was born 24 May 1777 and who died Sept 1845". They had nine children, two of whom were in the Wilkes Expedition and enjoyed some favour in Washington, District of Columbia before one attained a consular position in Hong Kong. Another was a major in the U.S. Marines, and another a Catholic priest and principal of a college.

== Portsmouth ==
At the death of his father the heirs were taken to Portsmouth, New Hampshire where Daniel remained until 1811. He was in business in Portsmouth, including overseas trade. Daniel and others made an insurance claim in 1804 after a ship Narcissa was "struck by a squall and took on water. Lost deckload of cattle and cargo ruined. Mate and two sailors drowned. Drifted forty days."

== Dover ==
He returned to Dover on 11 November 1811. "Daniel lived in the old house" built by his father. In 1815 he became a Justice of the Peace for Strafford County, New Hampshire

== Waldron lands ideal for textile milling ==
One of the enterprises that the Waldron name is not connected to is textile milling. Yet "[t]here were several advantageous physical conditions in Dover that made the goal of manufacturing cloth seem attainable. The town had water power, humidity in the atmosphere, pure water in the streams for bleaching, millsites in close proximity to the sea, an ample population, and a good transportation system in place. [Textile entrepreneurs] W&W (as Williams and Wendell came to be known) initially sought to purchase land at the First Falls of the Cochecho River (near the present Central Ave. bridge) but owner Daniel Waldron would not sell."

== Mortgage and loss of Waldron lands ==
.... "[But] in 1819, Daniel Waldron went bankrupt, and the land that W&W originally coveted at the First Falls (downtown Dover) suddenly became available."

This came about after Daniel "mortgaged, by deeds dated 29 April 1811, and 18 Dec. 1815 the falls and all the land on the north side of the river, excepting the small lot then in possession of [his sister] Abigail Boardman ...to the New Hampshire Strafford Bank; the Bank came into possession 31 January 1820, and conveyed the whole to William Payne of Boston 23 April 1821 .... Thus passed out of the Waldron possession the lands lying north of the river and west of Main street, a tract bounded on the south by a line striking from Main Street to the river as the north boundary of the "Horne lot" goes, then following up the river half the way to Whittier's fall till it met the Horne Property, then running a little east of north till it met the John Waldron property, thence east of the road, and so down the road to the west side of the Main street again. This did not include their property on the east of Main street nor south of the river."

== Last holder of the Waldron lands ==
Coat of Arms of Daniel Waldron

"Daniel was the last owner of the extensive Waldron real estate in Dover. It probably came into the family in 1642, when the mill privilege in the centre of our city was granted to Major Richard Waldron, from whom it descended to his son Colonel Richard Waldron in 1689; who bequeathed it to his son Secretary Richard Waldron in 1730; from whom it descended in 1753 to his son Thomas Westbrook Waldron (he purchasing certain rights of his brother George,) who bequeathed it to Daniel Waldron by will proved in 1785.

"The property at the present time [1850-1888] is immensely valuable but its value has been mainly created by the manufacturing establishments erected upon it. When the eyes of some manufacturers were bent upon the water power, they obtained possession of the bulk of the estate, which passed out of the hands of Daniel Waldron 31 January 1820. Upon that day an uninterrupted family ownership of one hundred and seventy-eight years terminated. With the disappearance of an old and illustrious family, the release of a third of our central territory to the use of a new population and the whirl of machinery, old Dover passed away and new Dover began its life."
