= Richard Waldron =

English-born Puritan, politician, merchant, soldier

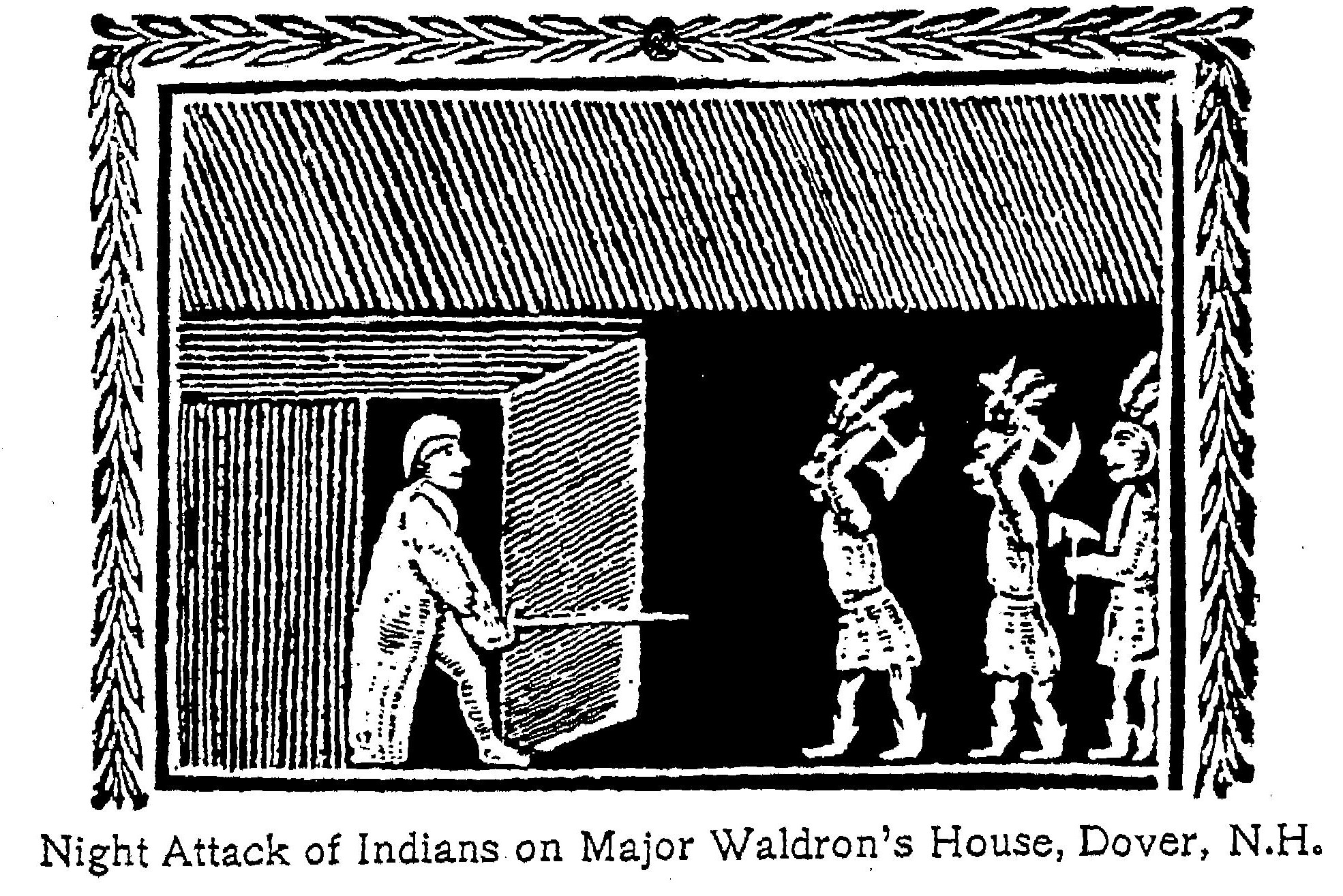
- Major Waldron defends against armed natives in the Cochecho Massacre of 1689

President of New Hampshire (acting)
- In office 1681–1682
- Preceded by: John Cutt
- Succeeded by: Edward Cranfield

Deputy President of New Hampshire
- In office 1680–1681
- Preceded by: Office Established
- Succeeded by: Elias Stileman

Member of the Great and General Court of Massachusetts representing Kittery
- In office 1679–1679
- Preceded by: John Wincoll
- Succeeded by: unk

Member of the Great and General Court of Massachusetts representing Dover
- In office 1656–1677
- Preceded by: Valentine Hill
- Succeeded by: Peter Coffin

Personal details
- Born: Richard Walderne; 6 January 1615 Alcester, Warwickshire, England
- Died: 27 June 1689 (aged 74) Dover, Province of New Hampshire
- Spouse(s): Unknown, m. 1640; Ann Scammon, m. 1670
- Parent(s): William Walderne and Catherine Raven
- Occupation: merchant, magistrate, councillor, mill owner, Major of the New Hampshire Militia and speaker of the colonial Massachusetts assembly
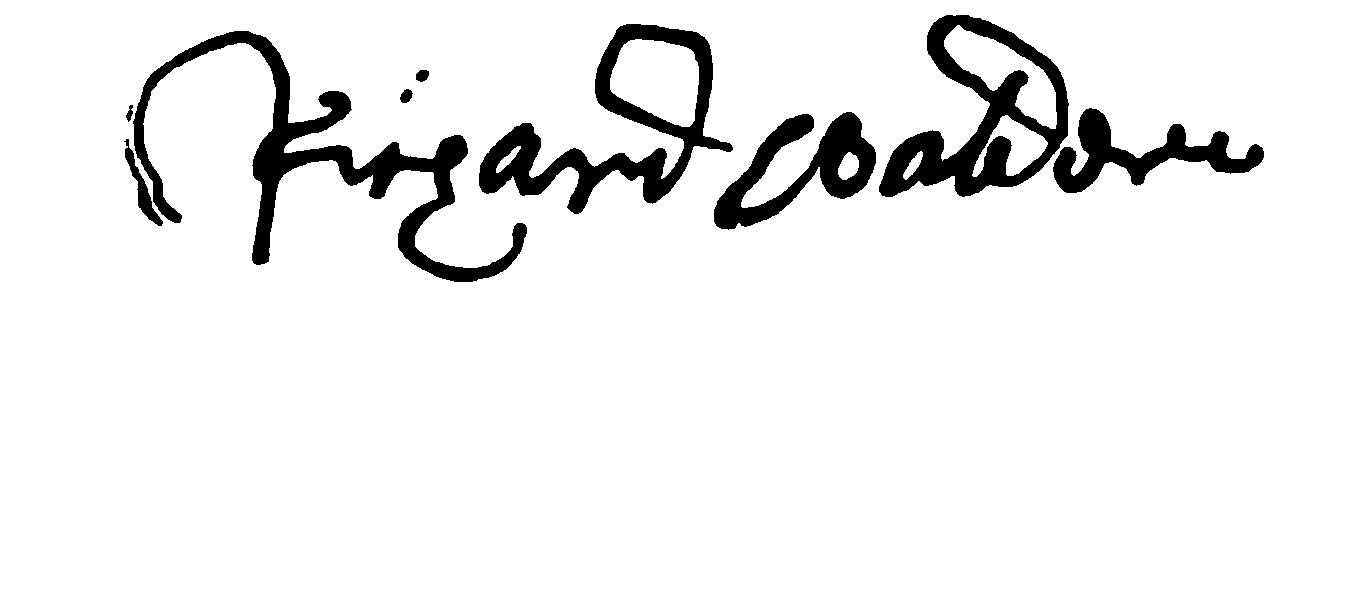
- Signature

Major Richard Waldron (or Richard Waldern, Richard Walderne; 6 January 1615 – 27 June 1689) was an English-born Puritan merchant, soldier, and government official who rose to prominence in early colonial Dover, New Hampshire. He started his career in the Massachusetts General Court, becoming Speaker of the House seven times. Upon the separation of the Province of New Hampshire from Massachusetts, he was appointed an inaugural member of the Royal Council of New Hampshire. He became its second president in 1681. He was opposed to the land claims of Robert Tufton Mason and the administration of Edward Cranfield. After the fall of the Dominion of New England, he was appointed to committee that would reincorporate New Hampshire into Massachusetts. His descendants remained prominent in Dover for several generations.

Described as an "immensely able, forceful and ambitious" member of a well-off Puritan family, he left his English home and moved to what is now Dover, New Hampshire. He first came about 1633. He built mills on the Cochecho River in what is now downtown Dover, amassed local land holdings that endured in his family for over 170 years, controlled much of the local native trade, and was prominent in local politics and as deputy to the Massachusetts General Court for 25 years from 1654. He was speaker several times. When the first president of the colonial New Hampshire council, John Cutt, died suddenly, council member Walderne became the acting president or governor until Edward Cranfield arrived from England. "By the 1670s the portion of Dover known as Cochecho [village] had become something like Waldron's personal fiefdom, and citizens in the other areas of settlement rarely challenged his social authority."

== Birth and family ==
Waldron (or Walderne) was born in Alcester, Warwickshire, England. One of many children of William Walderne and Catherine Raven, he was christened on 6 January 1615. Little is known of his early life. The name of his first wife is unknown, but he married her in 1640 and they had ten children together.

Their children were Paul (b. 1642), Timothy (b. 1646), Richard (b. 1650), Anna (b. 1654), Elnathan (b. 1659), Esther (b. 1660), Mary (b. 1663), Eleazer (b. 1665), Elizabeth (b. unk), Maria (b. 1668).

In 1670, at age 55, he married Ann Scammon; they had no children together. She died February 7, 1685.

== Arrival in Dover ==
Richard Waldron first appears on a list of principal Puritan families brought to Dover by Governor Thomas Wiggin in 1633 during the Great Migration. He then appears as a signatory on the Combination of the People of Dover to Establish a Form of Government in 1640. Several months later, in March 1641 appears on a petition to the General Court of Massachusetts objecting to Dover coming under Massachusetts rule. Both petitions were also signed by a William Waldron, which suggests he may have had a brother emigrate with him. Despite the prior objections, William accepted appointment as magistrate for Dover, along with Edward Hilton and Thomas Wiggin, after union with Massachusetts

In 1647, William Waldron died and his estate went to the General Court for probate. It was determined that his estate should be divided among his creditors.

Richard Waldron focused the next several decades focusing on his sawmills and political career. Dover granted him the privilege of cutting down 1500 town owned trees for his sawmill in exchange for a payment of 3 pence per tree. By 1650, he was paying the highest level of tax in the town.

== Political Career ==
In 1657, he is first mentioned as representing Dover at the Massachusetts General Court. He would represent Dover for over 20 years. In 1661 he and Edward Hilton were selected as "Associates of the Court." The next year he was also selected as a Justice of the Peace and empowered to marry.

In 1662, three Quaker missionaries, Ann Coleman, Mary Tompkins and Alice Ambrose, arrived in Dover from England. Within weeks, their ministry became the subject of a public petition by the Puritan townsfolk, 'humbly craving relief against the spreading and the wicked errors of the Quakers among them'. Waldron, as the local crown magistrate, ordered them to be punished as vagabonds by being bound behind a cart and being made to walk over 80 miles (130 km) in a bitter winter through ten neighboring townships. Beginning in Dover, and on arrival in each township, they were to be publicly stripped to the waist and whipped ten times. Major Robert Pike stopped the torture and released them in Salisbury, the third township in which they were mistreated. There, after urgently required medical assistance from Walter Barefoote, the women left for Maine. These three Quaker women are the subject of the poem How the Women Went from Dover by the 19th-century American Quaker poet, John Greenleaf Whittier.

Around 1665, Robert Tufton Mason, the heir of John Mason, began a petition to have Dover secede from Massachusetts. It was known that their purpose was to turn Dover into a proprietary colony with themselves as the proprietors. The town of Dover sent a signed petition to the General Court urging it not to dissolve the union. Waldron was one of those opposed to separation.

Waldron was later involved in an attempt to settle Concord, New Hampshire. He built a truckhouse, likely the first house in the area, along with Peter Coffin and his son Paul. However in June 1668, a Thomas Dickinson was found murdered by a drunken Indian. Waldron and his son were accused of illegally selling alcohol to the Indian. They denied it under oath and Peter Coffin later confessed that the alcohol came from his store. This caused the plan to fall apart and Concord would not be settled until 1725.

Later in 1668, he was second in command to John Leverett in an expedition to restore Massachusetts rule over the Province of Maine. In 1669, he was appointed a member of a commission to determine a location for the church in Kittery, Maine. He would later represent that town in Boston in 1679..

== Activities During King Philip's War ==
When King Philip's War broke out in Plymouth Colony in June 1675 and then spread to the rest of New England, Richard Waldron supported the war effort by issuing a commission to his nephew William Waldron. The commission was "to pursue, kill and destroy and by all ways and means to annoy the said Indian enemies..." On behalf of his uncle, William engaged the ship Endeavor and sailed the coast of Maine as part of the Northeast Coast Campaign (1675).

While the war was ongoing in the rest of New England, Major Waldron attempted to bring peace to Dover, New Hampshire by signing a non-aggression pact with the local Pennacook Indians. In June 1676, he invited representatives of the Pennacooks to Dover to negotiate a peace.

He succeeded in the negotiations and he, along with Nicholas Shapleigh and Thomas Daniels, signed the Treaty of Cocheco on 3 July 1676. It was ratified on behalf of the Pennacook by Chief Wonalancet, Sampson Aboquecemoka, Mr William Sagamore, Chief Squando of the Pequawket, Robin Dony of the Canibas, Serogumba, Samuel Numphow, and Warockomec.

At the end of the war, a number of Indians fleeing from the Massachusetts Bay Colony militia took refuge with the Abenaki tribe living around Dover. This was a violation of Article 2 of the Treaty of Cocheco. Since Dover was a part of Massachusetts at the time, the Massachusetts General Court ordered Waldron to attack these natives and turn any refugee combatants over to them.

Waldron believed he could capture the natives without a pitched battle by resorting to subterfuge and so, on 7 September 1676, he invited the natives—about 400 in total, half local and half refugees—to participate in a mock battle against the militia. After the natives had fired their guns, Waldron, aided by Charles Frost, took them prisoner. Waldron then sent both the refugee combatants and those locals who violently objected to this forced breach of hospitality to Boston, where seven or eight leaders were convicted of insurrection and executed, including Monoco, Muttawmp, Matoonas, and Old Jethro (Tantamous) to whom Waldron may have promised amnesty in negotiations with his son Peter Jethro. The rest of the captives were sold into slavery in "foreign parts", mostly Barbados.

The local Indians were released, but never forgave Waldron for the deception, which violated all the rules of honor and hospitality valued by both sides.

In 1677, the Massachusetts Government ordered Major Waldron to lead an expedition of 200 men to protect the English settlements in Maine, where the war was still ongoing. They sailed north in the beginning of February and stopped in several ports and engaged in minor skirmishes with the Indians. They went as far north as the Kennebec River where they built a small stockade. Major Waldron left the fort under the command of Silvanus Davis and forty men. Shortly thereafter, a number of men were killed or capture and the remaining men returned to Portsmouth.

== Career in Independent New Hampshire ==
After the death of John Cutt in 1681, Waldron became the President of New Hampshire and appointed Elias Stileman as his deputy. He continued the policies of Cutt to align New Hampshire with Massachusetts.

In 1683, Waldron was replaced by royally appointed Edward Cranfield but he remained on the council of the Province of New Hampshire.

In the aftermath of the minor Gove's Rebellion, Waldron sentenced Hampton Councilman Edward Gove to be hanged, drawn, and quartered. Although he passed the sentence, the royal governor did not have the authority to carry it out and Edward Gove was sent to the Tower of London. Richard Waldron remains the only member of the New Hampshire judiciary to sentence anyone to that punishment.

After the collapse of the Dominion of New England in 1689, Richard Waldron was elected as a deputy to a convention to choose a form of government for New Hampshire. Due to the Cochecho Massacre, he never participated.

== Masonian property dispute ==
Perhaps because he was a prominent landholder, he was singled out for a lawsuit which was part of a plan seeking to overturn all land titles in colonial New Hampshire in favor of the descendants of John Mason, a colonial governor and sailor who was granted a land patent for the Province of New Hampshire by the Crown and planted the first English colonists there.

== Cochecho Massacre ==
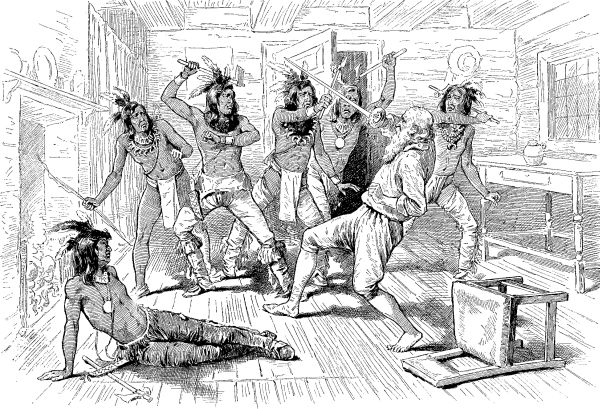
The death of Major Waldron

During King William's War natives took revenge on Waldron for his actions during King Philip's War in the Cochecho Massacre of 1689. At the time local Pennacook women were regularly allowed into the garrisoned homes of the Dover settlers when they requested shelter for the night. Some settlers were concerned about the lack of vigilance and possible danger from this practice, but Waldron mocked their fears: "go plant your pumpkins" (i.e. I will protect you) Their concern was justified, as on the night of 27 June 1689, native women seemingly staying peacefully overnight opened garrison house doors to waiting armed warriors. One historian wrote, "In one bloody afternoon, a quarter of the colonists in what is now downtown Dover, NH were gone – 23 killed, 29 captured in a revenge attack by native warriors." The elderly Waldron, once disarmed, was singled out for special torture and mutilation: the Indians cut him across the belly with knives, each saying "I cross out my account," and his house burned. Charles Frost was ambushed by natives in 1697 during King William's War for his collaboration with Waldron during the pair's trickery in King Philip's War.

Waldron is buried in the Cochecho Burying Ground, Dover, which is also known as Waldron Cemetery.

== Family legacy ==
Coat of Arms of Richard Waldron

His son Richard, grandson Richard, and great-grandson Thomas Westbrook Waldron were successively members of the Royal Council for the Province of New Hampshire. The influence of this branch of the Waldron family in New Hampshire declined after the American Revolution, and though Thomas Westbrook Waldron gave his qualified support to the new United States. This decline came despite the combining of families of influence within the Waldrons: President John Cutt's daughter Hannah married the second Richard Waldron and, after her death, Cutt's grandniece Elinor Vaughan also married the second Richard Waldron. The third Richard counted two more governors among his family connections; an uncle George Vaughan and Vaughan's brother-in-law Jonathan Belcher. Richard III in turn married the only daughter of Colonel Thomas Westbrook, leader of the eastern militia and a one-time councillor, grand daughter of a successful Portsmouth sea merchant, Captain John Sherburne, and great-granddaughter of one of the Laconia Company factors and "assistant governor" Ambrose Gibbins. However, "With the disappearance of an old and illustrious family, the release of a third of our central territory to the uses of a new population and the whirl of machinery, old Dover passed away and new Dover began its life."

The family did not entirely disappear after the transfer of the extensive Waldron lands. A Thomas Westbrook Waldron, grandson of Colonel Thomas Westbrook Waldron, moved north to found a Canadian branch of the family in Charlotte County, New Brunswick. Two other grandsons, Richard Russell Waldron and Thomas Westbrook Waldron, became members of the Wilkes Expedition and lent the family name to Cape Waldron in the Antarctic, a landmark in Hawaii, and Waldron Island in the San Juan Islands of present-day Washington state. Another was an early Major of the United States Marines Corps, and yet another a college principal.

== See also ==
- List of colonial governors of New Hampshire
- List of speakers of the Massachusetts House of Representatives
- New Hampshire Historical Marker No. 282: Native Retribution Against Maj. Waldron

== Works consulted ==
- "Richard Waldron" in: "Brief Notices of Councilors", Collections of the New Hampshire Historical Society, Volume 8 By New Hampshire Historical Society, pp. 332–341 gives a comprehensive biography

Government offices
Preceded by John Cutt	President of the Province of New Hampshire (acting); 1681–82	Succeeded by Edward Cranfield as Governor of the Province of New Hampshire
