= Broad Oak, Wealden =

Village in East Sussex, England

Broad Oak
- Location within East Sussex
- Area: 0.4250 km^{2} (0.1641 sq mi)
- Population: 1,093 (2020 estimate)
  - Density: 2,572/km^{2} (6,660/sq mi)
- Civil parish: Heathfield and Waldron
- District: Wealden
- Shire county: East Sussex
- Region: South East
- Country: England
- Sovereign state: United Kingdom
- Post town: Heathfield
- Postcode district: TN21
- Police: Sussex
- Fire: East Sussex
- Ambulance: South East Coast
- UK Parliament: Bexhill and Battle

Broad Oak is a small village near the town of Heathfield, East Sussex, England, often referred to as Broad Oak Heathfield, as there is a village with the same name, also in East Sussex, near to Brede. It is in the civil parish of Heathfield and Waldron. In 2020 it had an estimated population of 1093.

A village shop, village hall with children's play area and church are located on the main road, the A265, which runs through the village, eventually leading to the High Street in the town of Heathfield

The village primary school closed in 2020 in favour of housing development on the site.
