= Krumdiack Homestead =

Historic house in Washington, United States

- U.S. National Register of Historic Places
- U.S. Historic district
- Location within Washington (state)
- Location: Waldron Island, Washington
- Coordinates: 48°43′3″N 123°1′20″W
- Built: 1890
- Architect: Friedrich Krumdiak
- NRHP reference No.: 93000367
- Added to NRHP: April 29, 1993

Krumdiack Homestead (also known as the Cook Property) is located on the northern coast of Waldron Island, Washington between Fishery Point and Point Hammond.

It was built in 1890 by Friedrich Krumdiak. The site was added to the National Register of Historic Places in 1993.
