= June Burn =

American author and columnist

June Burn (1893–1969) was an American non-fiction writer and columnist.

== Background and career ==
Burn was born Inez Chandler Harris on June 19, 1893, in Anniston, Alabama. Her father was a Methodist circuit riding minister. At age sixteen, she moved to Oklahoma and eventually graduated from Oklahoma State University. Many years later, she completed her M.A. in Soil and Nutrition under William Albrecht at the University of Missouri.

In 1917, Harris started working as a staff writer for McCall's in New York City. Two years later she met and married Farrar Burn (1888–1974), a recent World War I veteran, while living outside of Washington, D.C. Over the next fifty years, Farrar and June travelled extensively around the United States, homesteading in the San Juan Islands, teaching Eskimos and traveling across the United States in a covered wagon. She wrote extensively for various periodicals and wrote several books. Burn's autobiography Living High: An Unconventional Autobiography (1941) documents much of her early life story, particularly her time on Waldron Island and other islands in Washington's San Juan Islands. The book has been republished several times. June Burn died in 1969 and her husband Farrar died in 1974. They were both buried in Van Buren, Arkansas. Burn's daughter-in-law, Doris Burn, was a notable children's book author and illustrator.
