= Paines Cross Meadow =

Coordinates: 50.991°N 0.301°E

- Site of Special Scientific Interest
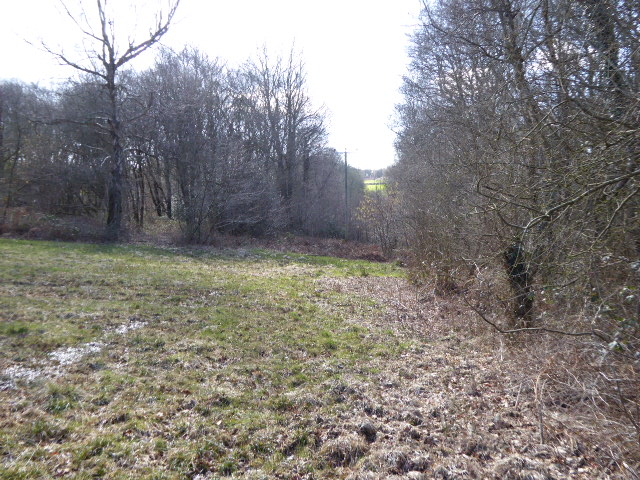
- Location of Paines Cross Meadow.
- Area of search: East Sussex
- Grid reference: TQ 616 238
- Interest: Biological
- Area: 3.7 hectares (9.1 acres)
- Notification date: 1993
- Location map: Magic Map

Paines Cross Meadow is a 3.7-hectare (9.1-acre) biological Site of Special Scientific Interest north-east of Heathfield in East Sussex.

This site is damp meadow on heavy clay with some areas of peat around springs. There are diverse invertebrates, including great green and dark bush-crickets and common blue and gatekeeper butterflies.

The site is private land with no public access.
