= The Waldron =

Coordinates: 51°28′37″N 0°1′55″W

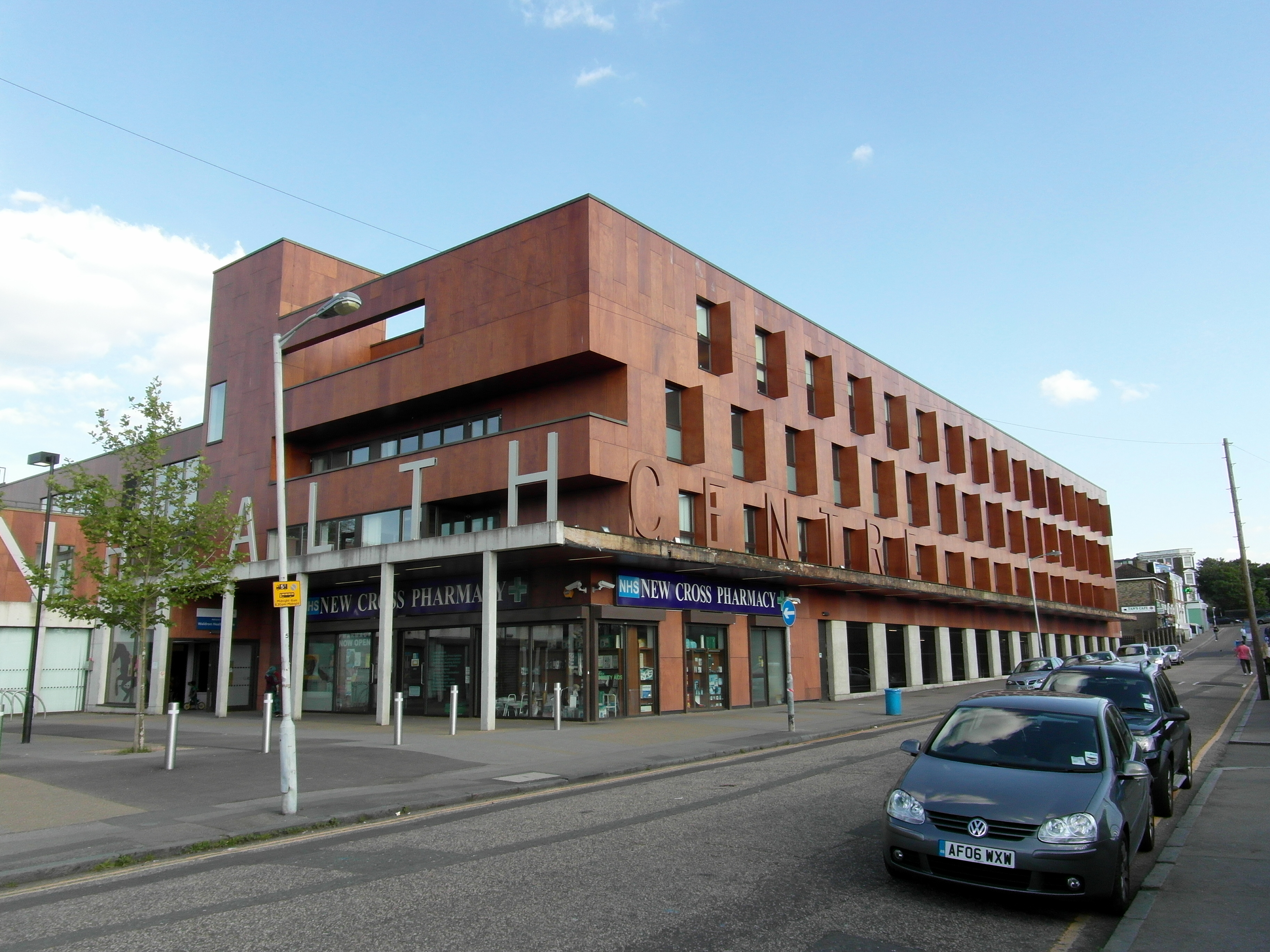
The Waldron Health Centre

The Waldron Health Centre is a National Health Service (NHS) building next to New Cross railway station in Lewisham, South London, England. It was completed in phases, with the health centre finished in 2008 and final construction ending in 2010.

== Construction ==
The Waldron building project had a budget of £13.4m.

The Project Architect was Craig Linnell of Henley, Halebrown and Rorrison. The Services Engineering company was Ramboll.

Construction began in 2006, with the project divided into phases. Phases I and II, which comprise the health center and some retail units, were completed in 2008. Phase III, with housing and more retail, was completed in 2010.

== Use ==
The complex's final footprint is 6,029 m^{2} (64,900 sq ft). It is occupied by the Amersham Vale Training Practice, Clifton Rise Family Practice, and the New Cross Health Centre.

== See also ==
- Healthcare in London
