= James Dawson Burn =

Author (1809–1889)

- Born: James Dawson McBurney c. 1801; County Down, Ireland
- Died: 1889; Hammersmith, West London
- Notable work: The Autobiography of a Beggar Boy
- Children: 18

James Dawson Burn (c. 1809 – 1889), born James Dawson McBurney, was an Irish author, vagrant, and prominent Odd fellow. His most notable work, The Autobiography of a Beggar Boy, was regarded at the time as a prime example of a poor Irish man's experience.

== Early life ==
=== Childhood and family ===
Burn's exact date of birth is unknown, but scholars estimate his birth to be sometime in the early 1800s, roughly between 1801-1809. He was born in County Down, Ireland to an unmarried Scottish woman working as a saleswoman, sometimes regarded as a beggar. As a child of unmarried parents, he was considered illegitimate in Ireland and the rest of Europe. Due to the widespread discrimination against illegitimate children, Burn felt ostracized from the rest of society from a very young age.

As a young child, he lived with his mother and step-father, referred to as "McNamee", whom he described as temperamental. There is no mention of any siblings in his upbringing. After leaving his mother and stepfather’s house, he began to live with his biological father "McBurney," who worked as a weaver, and had Irish heritage. After living with his father for a time, he left Ireland to begin a nomadic life in his late teen and adult years. Burn changed his last name from McBurney to Burn around 1816, as a possible attempt to hide his Irish heritage as a response to anti-Irish sentiment in Great Britain or distance himself from his father.

After moving to Glasgow in 1830, Burn met his first wife Kitty. They had five children together, and Kitty, along with one of their children, died in 1837 due to typhus. In 1838, Burn remarried and had 13 more children. By the time of his death, both wives and 5 of his 18 children had died. Though most of his children’s names remain unknown, his eldest son was named Thomas.

=== Emigration ===
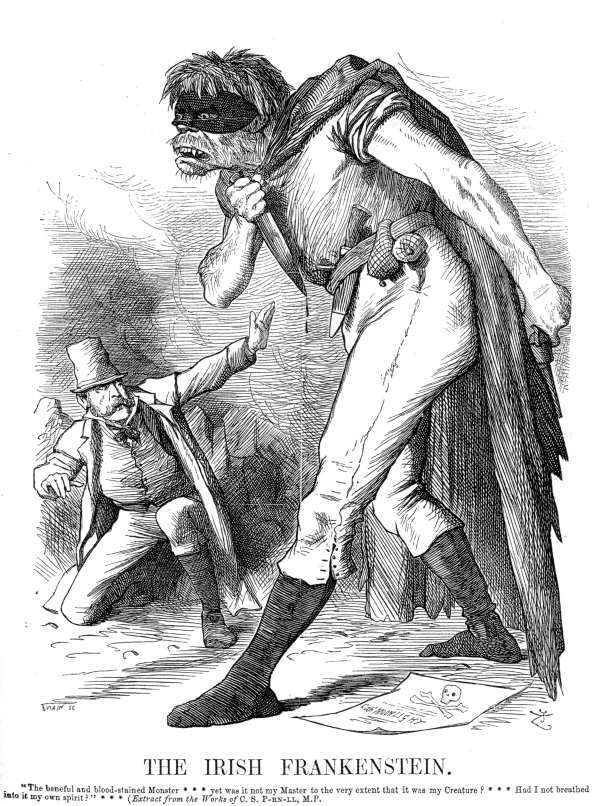
Anti-Irish Propaganda From the 1800s

Burn spent his early adult years in England and Scotland. After leaving Ireland, he settled in Hexham, England, until his relocation to Glasgow, Scotland in 1830. After living his Glasgow for 20 years, he returned a life of tramping throughout England in 1850. Throughout his travels, he often felt like a social pariah, as he often referred to himself as a "wandering outcast." Due to the massive influx of Irish immigrants in the 19th century, the persona of the Irish traveler, which is how Burn was identified, became a common enemy. He often moved from city to city, and lived with serious financial instability during points of his adult life. Due to his state of homelessness, he was considered to be a vagabond or vagrant. After his time in Scotland and England, Dawson Burn eventually relocated to New York in the 1860s. He returned to England in the late 1860s until his death in 1889 in London.

== Careers and interests ==
=== Hat trade ===
Burn entered the hat trade in the 1820s during his time in Hexham, England. In the 1830s, after his apprenticeship, he continued his career in Glasgow, Scotland. In the 1840s, Burn became the hatters' representative in the Glasgow United Committee of Trades Delegates. Harte argues that, due to his success in the hat trade in both Hexham and Glasgow, Burn gained "artisan status." However, it is unclear whether this is true, as some scholars claim that he lacked financial security throughout his career.

=== Involvement in radical politics ===
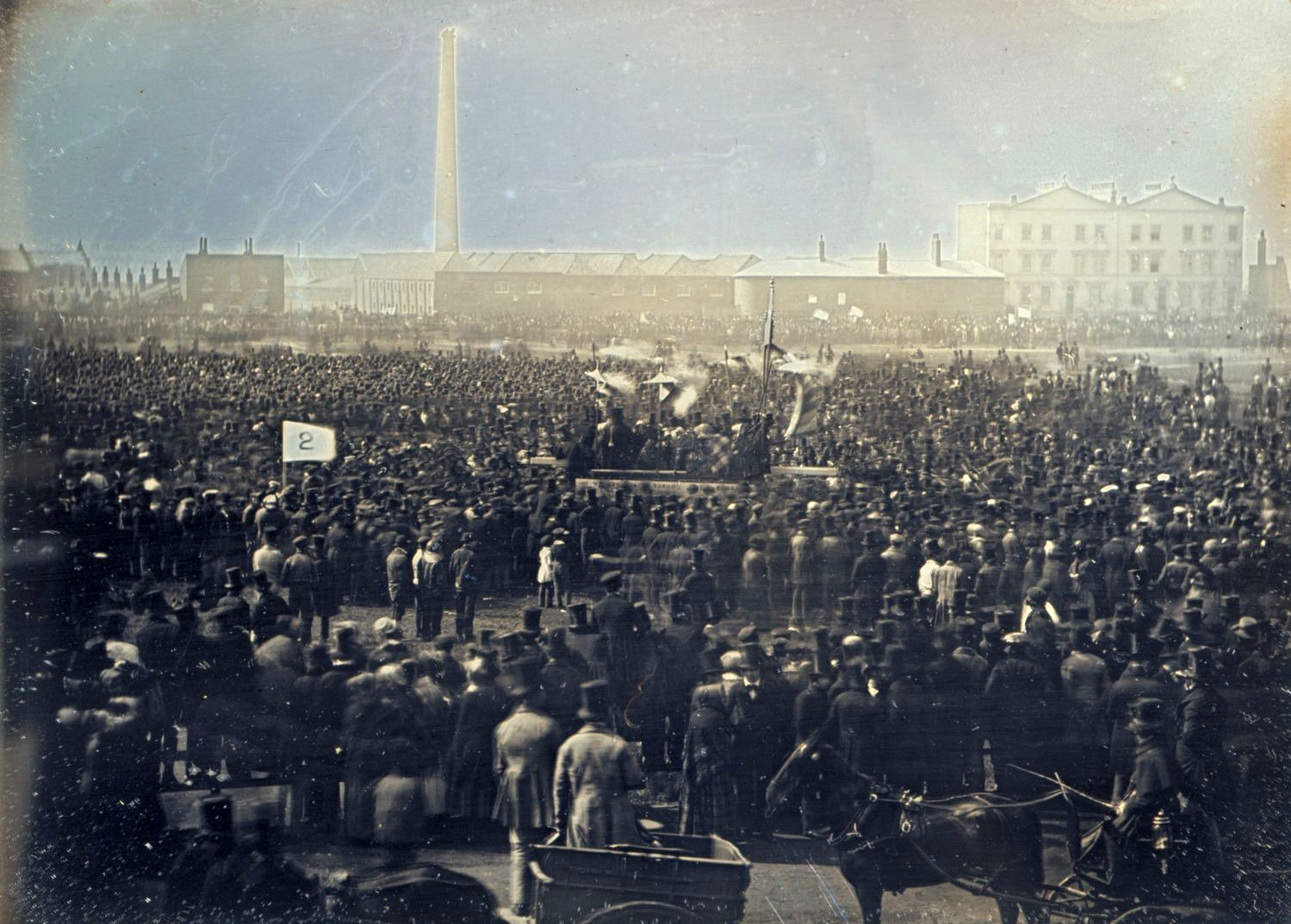
Chartist Meeting, London 1848

During Burn's time in Glasgow (approximately 1930-1950), he became an active political contributor. He became quite involved in the Oddfellows movement, an organization intended to "promote personal and social development," as well as in Chartism, a movement that advocated for non-wealthy and non-land owning men's right to vote. Before he stepped down, Burn was elected to the board of directors for the Oddfellow movement. He wrote a book on his involvement in these movements in 1845, titled An Historical Sketch of the Independent Order of Oddfellows.

=== Writer ===
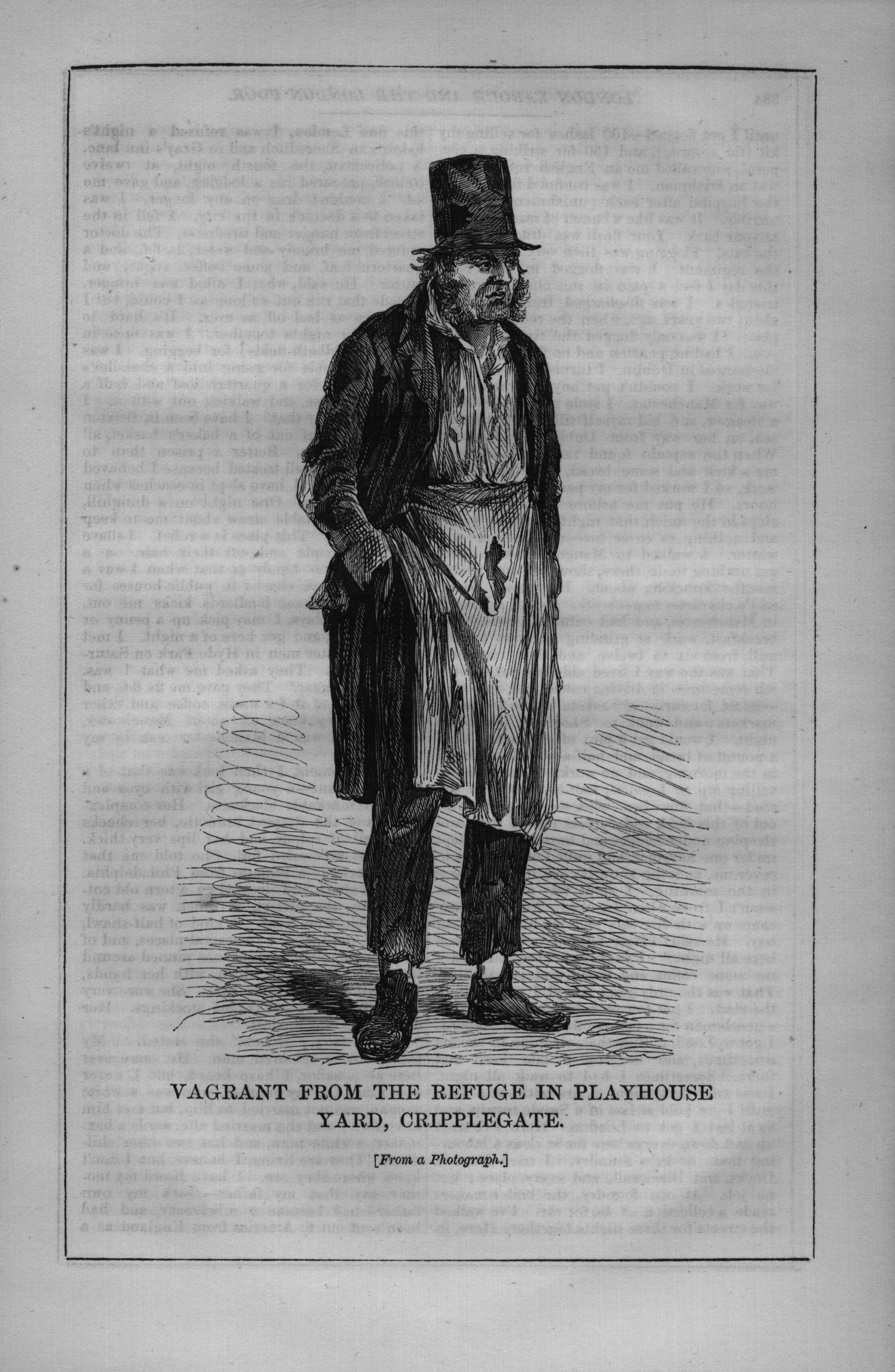
Depiction of a "Vagrant" in London Labour and the London Poor (1851)

Though Burn was completely self-educated and functionally illiterate until his early adulthood, he wrote at least five books in his lifetime. In 1850, Burn began writing The Autobiography of a Beggar Boy, his most well-known book. At this time, the profits from his time in the hatting trade ran thin, and he struggled financially. During the years he spent writing, more specifically between 1850 and 1860, he traveled around England. Aside from the book he wrote on the Oddfellows movement in the 1840s, most of his other works were written in the 1850s until his death in 1889.

=== Railroad inspector ===
After Burn's brief time in New York, he returned to England where he worked from 1871 to 1881 as a railroad inspector at the Great Eastern Railway.

== Notable works ==
=== An Historical Sketch of the Independent Order of Oddfellows M. U. ===
This work was likely Burn's first book. The text discusses Burn's involvement in the Order of Oddfellows, as well as a general overview of the movement.

=== The Autobiography of a Beggar Boy ===
Published in 1855, Burn's autobiography details the events of his childhood and migration throughout Europe in the 1800s. Originally intended as a collection of letters for his oldest son, Thomas, Burn narrates his life story as an Irish vagabond. Despite his own status as a vagrant, he also often expresses his judgement of other homeless individuals, frequently regarding them as criminals. Europa republished Burn's autobiography in 1978 with an added introduction by David Vincent. Additionally, Kessinger Publishing released another edition in 2010.

== Other works and literary inspirations ==
=== Works ===
- The Language of the Walls and a Voice From the Shop Windows (1855)
- Three Years Among the Working-classes in the United States During the War (1865)
- A Glimpse at the Social Condition of the Working Classes During the Early Part of the Present Century (1868)
- The History of Strikes (1879)

=== Literary inspirations ===
Charles Dickens was a strong literary inspiration for Burn's autobiography. Burn dedicated the book to Dickens. Additionally, Burn references novels from both Oliver Goldsmith and Daniel Defoe (The Vicar of Wakefield and Robinson Crusoe) in his autobiography as examples of 'acceptable' works of fiction.

== Legacy ==
Burn's greatest legacy is the impact of his autobiography. At the time of its release, it was a well-known book depicting homelessness from a first-person perspective, something that had rarely been done. In fact, scholars regard his book as the most well known autobiography written by a beggar. At the time of publishing, newspapers and magazines such as The Athanæum and The Spectator reviewed his Autobiography with praise for Burn's account of the harsh truths of tramping. Vagrants were often viewed as people of lesser intelligence, and a piece of writing such as his autobiography was unexpected from somebody of Burns' social status.
