= Richard Russell Waldron =

American explorer (1803–1846)

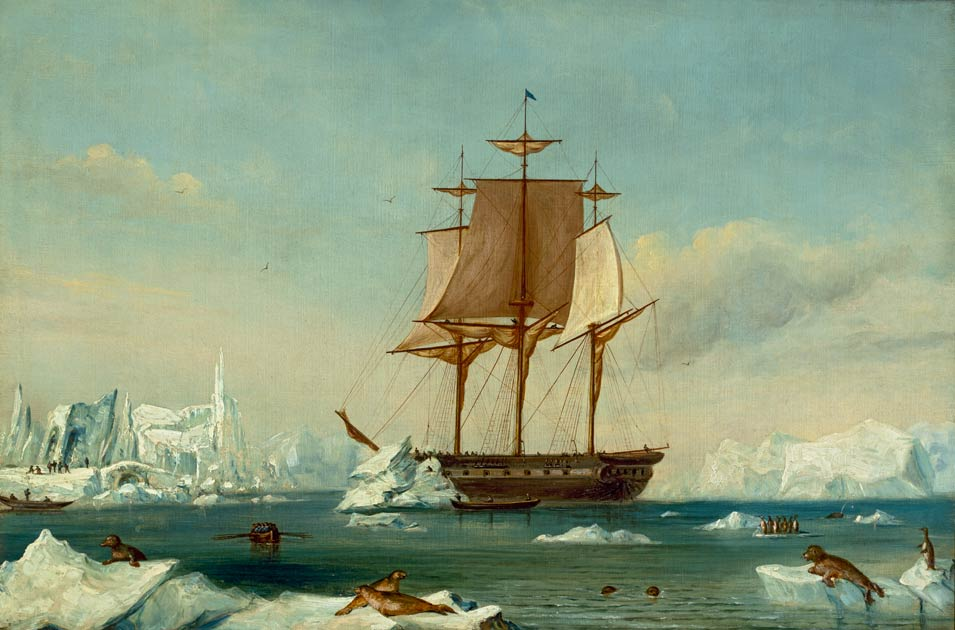
- Sloop USS Vincennes in the Antarctic, the ship that Waldron sailed in during the Wilkes Expedition
- Born: March 28, 1803
- Died: October 30, 1846 (aged 43)
- Occupations: Purser, U.S. Navy
- Parent(s): Daniel Waldron and Olive Sheafe

Richard Russell Waldron (1803-1846) was a purser "and special agent" in the Wilkes Expedition, together with younger brother Thomas. Several landmarks were named after him or his brother. After the expedition was completed Waldron enjoyed some popularity and influence in Washington, D.C.

== Youth ==
Born March 28, 1803, the oldest son of Daniel Waldron and Olive Huske Sheafe, he would have seen the 1819 bankruptcy of his father, the 1820 loss of the substantial landholdings that his family had possessed continuously since his ancestor Richard Waldron began to acquire Dover, New Hampshire holdings in 1635, and the 1821 death of his father.

== Family heirlooms ==
By February 1827 he was "of Portsmouth" and he had possession of his ancestor Richard Waldron's papers. In September 1845 he provided Father Sebastien Rale's strongbox, another family heirloom, for safekeeping to the Massachusetts Historical Society.

== Wilkes Expedition ==
Waldron was a member of the Wilkes Expedition which in 1840 visited Antarctica. Cape Waldron was named after him.

In July 1840 the Wilkes Expedition named a small Fijian island after Waldron. This island may be more often referred to by its dual name of Namotu Island.

This expedition also charted much of the west coast of the then-disputed Washington state coast, including the San Juan Islands of present-day Washington State. In May 1841 one of the islands was named Waldron Island.

The expedition also visited Hawaii where "Purser R. R. Waldron and Joseph Drayton ventured inside Kilauea Caldera (in present day Hawaii Volcanoes National Park) and walked on the dome's hot surface until lava oozed through cracks that formed within fifteen feet of them." Waldron Ledge, which overlooks the caldera from the eastern rim, is a popular twenty-minute hike from the park visitor center where rangers often take groups on short talks.

Waldron also witnessed a treaty between the United States (signed by Wilkes) and the Sultan of Sulu in 1842.

== Washington, D.C. ==
In the months after the conclusion of the Wilkes Expedition, several of the officers found themselves much in demand in Washington society. "Chief among the widely traveled sailors being adoringly feted was Richard R. Waldron ...." "...[T]he well-connected Richard Waldron ... was scheduled to dine with Secretary of State Daniel Webster at the secretary's home that evening [December 24, 1842]."

In December 1842 he was among those credited with assisting the delegation from the Kingdom of Hawaii. They "received encouragement and support from knowledgeable and experienced naval officers, most notably Charles Wilkes and Richard Waldron, who had traversed the immense reaches of the Pacific Ocean and understood the strategic importance of the Hawaiian Islands.... In all, these [and other] insider contacts paved the way for Haalilio and Richards to meet on seven occasions with the reluctant and evasive Secretary Webster. Eventually the Hawaiian delegates also succeeded in having an audience with President John Tyler and other members of his cabinet.

Waldron was even linked with Julia Gardiner, future wife of President Tyler. Before that romance flourished, "it seems Julia and sister Margaret often went dancing and that Julia's date sometimes was naval officer Richard R. Waldron, 23, who had been a member of the Pacific explorations of Wilkes. Julia considered him too "boyish". Having passed up Mr. Waldron, Julia Gardiner Tyler became the second wife of President Tyler a couple of years later, at the age of 24.

Historian Edward Crapol incorrectly characterizes the then 39-year-old Richard Russell Waldron as a young 23-year-old midshipman in 1842, and Lyle Emerson Nelson follows him in that. It is not known whether Waldron appeared very young for his age, or if his youngest brother Thomas (then 28) was misidentified as him.

== Death ==
Waldron died unmarried on October 30, 1846, four years after the Wilkes Expedition concluded.

== Landmarks ==
Cape Waldron in Antarctica, and perhaps two Waldron Islands, one in Fiji and a possible second island in Washington state, are named after him. Waldron Ledge overlooking the Kilauea Caldera in Hawaii is named after him.
