= Edward Burn (legal scholar) =

English barrister and legal scholar (1922–2019)

Edward Hector Burn (20 November 1922 – 6 February 2019) was an English barrister and legal scholar and fellow of Christ Church, a constituent college of the University of Oxford. He updated Geoffrey Cheshire's Modern Law of Real Property which became known as "Cheshire and Burn".
