= St Dunstan's Farm Meadows =

Uk Site of Special Scientific Interest

Coordinates: 50.951°N 0.286°E

- Site of Special Scientific Interest
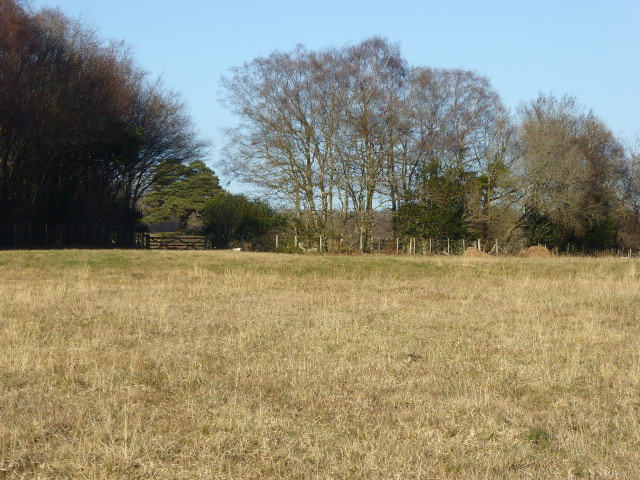
- Location of St Dunstan's Farm Meadows.
- Area of search: East Sussex
- Grid reference: TQ 607 193
- Interest: Biological
- Area: 10.2 hectares (25 acres)
- Notification date: 1992
- Location map: Magic Map

St Dunstan's Farm Meadows is a 10.2-hectare (25-acre) biological Site of Special Scientific Interest south-east of Heathfield in East Sussex. It is in the High Weald Area of Outstanding Natural Beauty.

This site has three unimproved meadows which are traditionally managed. They are dominated by red fescue and common bent grass and other flora include sweet vernal-grass, pignut, sheep's sorrel and field woodrush.

A footpath crosses one of the fields.
