= Jimmy Burn =

Australian rules footballer

Personal information
- Full name: Jimmy Burn
- Born: 17 December 1877
- Died: 7 September 1934 (aged 56)

Playing career^{1}
| Years | Club | Games (Goals) |
| 1903 | Melbourne | 1 (0) |
- ^{1} Playing statistics correct to the end of 1903.

Jimmy Burn (17 December 1877 – 7 September 1934) was an Australian rules footballer who played with Melbourne in the Victorian Football League (VFL).
