= Doris Burn =

American writer

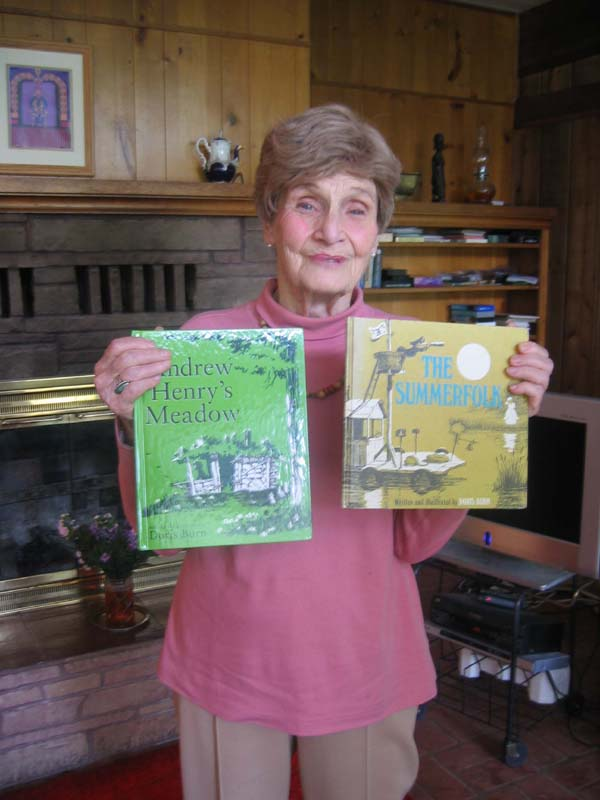
- Doris Burn at her home in Guemes Island, Washington
- Born: Doris Wernstedt; April 24, 1923; Portland, Oregon
- Died: March 9, 2011 (aged 87); Bellingham, Washington
- Education: University of Washington
- Writing career
- Period: 1965–1976
- Notable work: Andrew Henry's Meadow

Doris "Doe" Burn (born Doris Wernstedt; April 24, 1923 – March 9, 2011) was an American children's book author and illustrator. She lived most of her life on Waldron Island in the San Juan Islands archipelago of Washington.

== Life and career ==
Doris Wernstedt was born in Portland, Oregon, to Lage Wernstedt, an explorer, mountaineer and United States Forest Service worker, and his wife, Adele. The family resided on Guemes Island near Anacortes. After being interviewed by writer June Burn for the Bellingham Herald, the Wernstedt and Burn families became friends; the two families had nearby summer cabins on Waldron, a small island without ferry service.

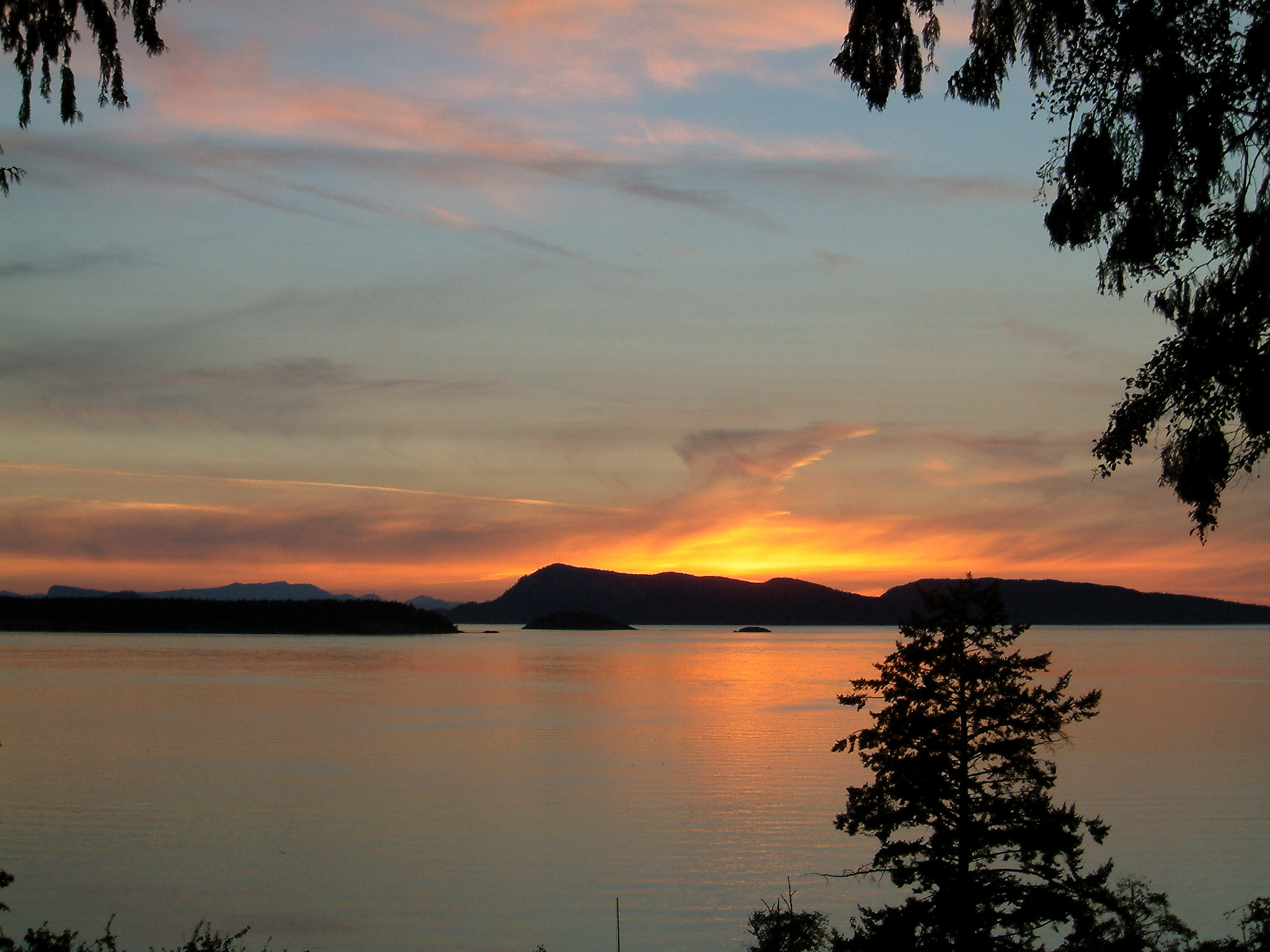
Waldron Island as seen from YMCA Camp Orkila

Burn attended the University of Oregon and the University of Hawaii, and graduated from the University of Washington. She married South ("Bob") Burn after World War II and the couple made their home on Waldron Island. She had four children, whom she taught for one year on Guemes Island's one-room schoolhouse. Burn separated from her husband, but they remained lifelong friends and neighbors. Burn worked on her meticulous illustrations in the evenings, in "a small cabin where she spends the day at work after chopping enough wood to keep the fire going through the day, hauling two buckets of water from the pump for washing brushes and pens and brewing 'a perpetual pot of tea.'" Waldron Island was without electricity, telephone service, running water or merchants. All of her goods and supplies were brought by boat from the mainland. In 1956, Burn took a portfolio of illustrations to publishers in New York and was encouraged to continue working. Her children remember her working late nights by lantern-light with the fireplace burning down to embers.

Her oldest son, Mark Nathaniel Burn, was the inspiration for her first book, Andrew Henry's Meadow (1965), the story of a boy who, ignored by his family, builds a retreat for himself in a nearby meadow. He is soon joined by other children for whom he also builds houses, tailored to their interests and hobbies. Andrew Henry's Meadow won the Washington Governor's Art Award and was a Weekly Reader book club selection. It was reissued in a 40th anniversary edition by San Juan Publishing in 2005 and again by Philomel Books in 2012,. She went on to write The Summerfolk and The Tale of Lazy Lizard Canyon, and illustrated eight others.

== Death ==
Doris "Doe" Burn died at her daughter's home in Bellingham, Washington on March 9, 2011, at the age of 87.

== Legacy ==
The Burn family donated a collection of Doris' work to Western Washington University. The collection is made available by Western Libraries Heritage Resources.

== Works ==
Cover of Burn's 1965 classic "Andrew Henry's Meadow"

=== Author and illustrator ===
- Burn, Doris (1965). Andrew Henry's Meadow. New York: Coward-McCann.
  - Fortieth Anniversary Edition. (2005) Woodinville, WA: San Juan Publishing. ISBN 0-9707399-2-3
- Burn, Doris (1968). The Summerfolk. New York: Coward-McCann.
- Burn, Doris (1976). The Tale of Lazy Lizard Canyon. New York: Putnam & Sons.

=== Illustrator ===
- Joseph Jacobs. Hudden and Dudden and Donald O'Neary. New York: Coward-McCann. 1968
- Robert Nathan. Tappy. Knopf. 1968
- Liesel Moak Skorpen. We Were Tired of Living in a House. New York: Coward-McCann. 1969
- Patricia Lee Gauch. My Old Tree. New York: Coward-McCann. 1970
- Patricia Lee Gauch. Christina Katerina & the Box. New York: Putnam & Grosset. 1971
- Oscar Brand, When I Came First to this Land. New York: G. B. Putnam's. 1974

=== Film ===
Actor Zach Braff has been adapting Andrew Henry's Meadow into a film for Twentieth Century Fox since 2004. Barry Sonnenfeld signed on to direct the film in early 2010.
