= Sapperton Meadows =

Protected area in East Sussex, England

Coordinates: 50.950°N 0.261°E

- Site of Special Scientific Interest
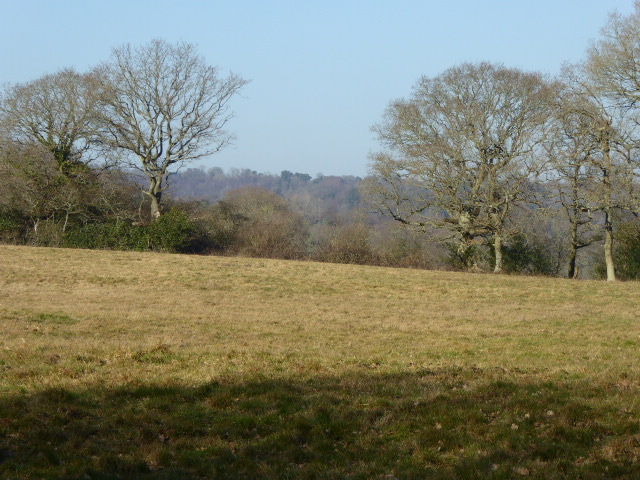
- Location of Sapperton Meadows.
- Area of search: East Sussex
- Grid reference: TQ 589 192
- Interest: Biological
- Area: 14.7 hectares (36 acres)
- Notification date: 1992
- Location map: Magic Map

Sapperton Meadows is a 14.7-hectare (36-acre) biological Site of Special Scientific Interest south of Heathfield in East Sussex.

These poorly drained hay meadows and rich pastures are managed by traditional techniques. The flora is diverse, with species such as dyer’s greenweed, lesser spearwort and fleabane. There is an extensive network of hedges which are probably old as they have many native trees and shrubs.

The site is crossed by footpaths.
