= Waldron High School =

Waldron High School may refer to:

- Waldron High School (Arkansas), located in Waldron, Arkansas.
- Waldron High School (Michigan), located in Waldron, Michigan.
- Waldron Junior-Senior High School (Indiana), located in Waldron, Indiana
