= Bingletts Wood =

Protected area in East Sussex, England

Coordinates: 50.967°N 0.307°E

- Site of Special Scientific Interest
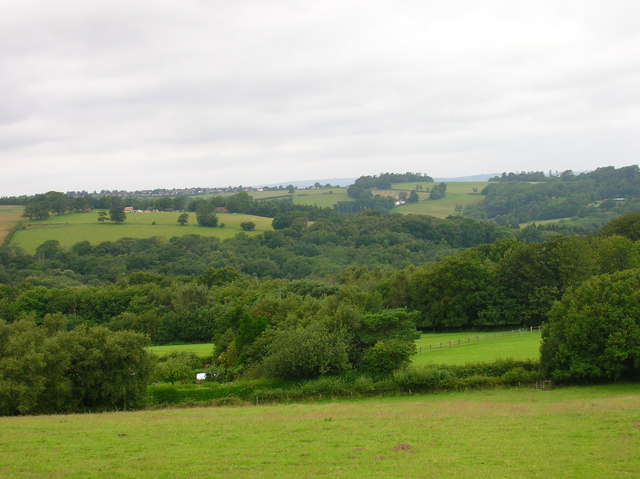
- Location of Bingletts Wood.
- Area of search: East Sussex
- Grid reference: TQ 621 211
- Interest: Biological
- Area: 16.0 hectares (40 acres)
- Notification date: 1985
- Location map: Magic Map

Bingletts Wood is a 16-hectare (40-acre) biological Site of Special Scientific Interest east of Heathfield in East Sussex.

Part of this ancient wood is a steep sided valley which has a warm and moist microclimate and it is rich in mosses and liverworts. A woodland glade has two ponds which support white water lily and several species of pondweed.

The site is private land with no public access.
