= Jane Burn =

British ballerina

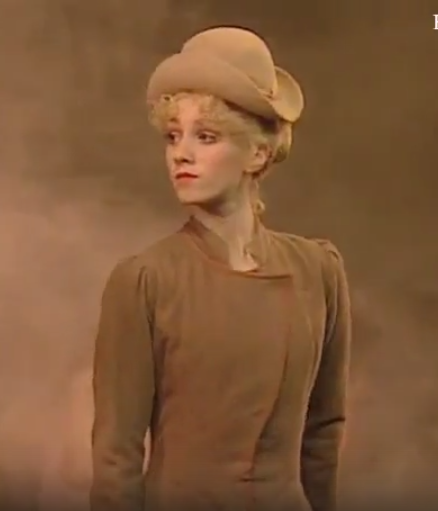
- Jane Burn as the Fairy of Eloquence in Sleeping Beauty (Royal Ballet, 1994)
- Born: 1973
- Occupation: Ballet dancer

Jane Burn (born in 1973) is a British ballerina, formerly a first soloist at the Royal Ballet.

Burn entered Royal Ballet School in 1986 and graduated in 1991, joining the Royal Ballet in the same year. She appeared in numerous productions including Mayerling, La Fille mal gardée, Coppélia and Rhapsody. She left the Royal Ballet company during the 2003-2004 season.

In 1991, Burn won a Professional Level Prize at the Prix de Lausanne Ballet competition in Switzerland.
