= Thomas Westbrook Waldron =

American military officer (1721–1785)

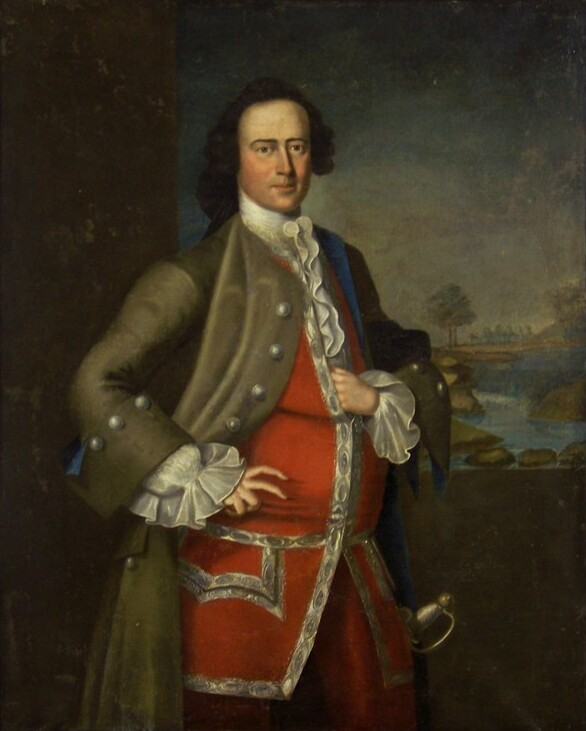
- Portrait by John Greenwood, 1750
- Born: January 6, 1721
- Died: April 3, 1785 (aged 64); Dover, New Hampshire
- Occupations: merchant, magistrate, councilor, mill owner, Captain and Colonel of the New Hampshire militia, county treasurer and recorder of deeds, and chairman in Dover, New Hampshire of the New Hampshire Committee of Safety
- Spouse: Constant or Constance Davis
- Children: William, Elizabeth, Richard, Samuel, Eleanor, Charles, Abigail, Daniel
- Parent(s): Richard Waldron and Elizabeth Westbrook

Thomas Westbrook Waldron was a prominent political figure in Dover, New Hampshire, and a military officer that fought in the Siege of Louisbourg of 1745. He later became a commissioner at Albany, New York, and then a royal councillor in 1782. During the American Revolution, Waldron abandoned his loyalist friend, British colonial governor of New Hampshire John Wentworth, to become a patriot of the United States.

== Family ==
Coat of Arms of Thomas Westbrook Waldron

Waldron was born into a wealthy family in Dover, New Hampshire. Waldron's great grandfather was Richard Waldron. His grandfather was Thomas Westbrook, who distinguished himself in Father Rale's War. He married Constance Davis of Durham, New Hampshire, about 1755. Of their children, two sons and three daughters had descendants. He was the namesake of many descendants, including two grandsons, one who was a Consul that died in Macao, the other moved to Canada.

Waldron built his home in Dover in 1763, which was described as "by far the best in Dover; its joiner work was ornate and elaborate, in every apartment; the furnishings were the best that period afforded.". "... [S]tood in Revolutionary times the mansion of Thomas Westbrook Waldrone, the soldier of Louisberg.".

== Louisburg ==
He became a captain in the New Hampshire militia in the Siege of Louisbourg (1745). He commanded one of the whale boats that landed under fire from the Fortress.

His correspondence from Louisbourg to his father gives a rare glimpse of life after the Siege. His letters to his father describe with some bitterness that the spoils of war did not go to New Englanders and rightly predicted that the men would be "Lul'd along" into occupying Louisbourg through the winter.

Waldron is critical of General Samuel Waldo, referring to him as "Duke Trinkelo".

== Political career ==
Waldron was the fourth generation in his family to assume public office in Dover. He was a selectmen, representative and town clerk. He was a representative (1768) and a councillor (1772) at Exeter. He also was a Recorder of Deeds, Strafford County (1776). He was the Dover, New Hampshire, town clerk from 30 March 1772 until his death in 1785.

In 1748 Waldron's father complained that though Thomas Westbrook Waldron had done much at the siege of Louisburg, he couldn't receive a significant militia commission: "and for which he has been very illy requited by Mr. W--ntw--th" However this situation improved when a different Wentworth became governor. In later life he was described as a colonel.

Waldron was a friend of historian Jeremy Belknap and encouraged him to write the History of New Hampshire (1831), the first history of the state.

== American Revolution ==
Waldron was also a friend of the last Royal Governor of New Hampshire, Governor Wentworth. Wentworth nominated Waldron for a position on Council (1767), mending historically strained relationships between the two families. Wentworth summoned Waldron to his home in response to the "Portsmouth Tea Party" in Sep 1774. Waldron broke with Wentworth and joined the patriot cause in the American Revolution (1776).

Waldron was chosen as a counsellor for Strafford County by the New Hampshire House of Representatives on Sat 6 Jan 1776. On January 17, 1776 an "Hon. John Wentworth, Esq., was chosen to be one of the Counsellors for the County of Strafford, in place of Waldron.

Even though he had joined the rebels, Waldron advocated for the fair treatment of Loyalist Americans. By August 19, 1776, as chairman of a revolutionary committee charged with inventorying a Loyalist's property, He wrote Meshech Weare that he hoped the "politeness, justice, and lenity [be] among the shining characteristicks of the American States...." including toward Loyalists.

== Death ==
"[He] died there [the TW Waldron house] April 3, 1785. He was buried in the burial ground west of the Methodist church. After his death, the children were carried to Portsmouth, where they remained for several years.

His will listed his properties. In addition to the Dover property he owned lands in Rochester, Barrington, Gilmanton, Grafton County, Lebanon, Chichester, Canaan, Kilkenny and the Globe Tavern, The Square and the Training field in Portsmouth, two mill privileges in Portsmouth, and part of the lower falls.

"These quantities of real estate were divided among his children, Charles and Daniel inheriting the Dover property. Daniel was the last owner of the extensive Waldron real estate in Dover. It probably came into the family in 1642 when the mill privilege in the center of Dover was granted to Major Richard Waldron. Upon January 31, 1820, an uninterrupted family ownership of 178 years terminated."

The youngest son Daniel, not yet four years old when his father's will was written, inherited the majority of the family's land in Dover.

== Portrait ==
Waldron had portraits of himself, his mother Elizabeth and his father Richard painted by John Greenwood (1750). A copy of Waldron's portrait hung in the "council chamber" of the Wentworth-Coolidge Mansion The copy is also owned by Historic New England.
