= Thomas Westbrook =

New England militia officer (1675-1743/44)

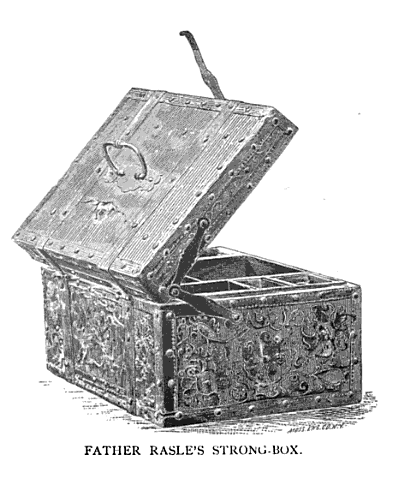
- Westbrook seized Father Rale's strong box
- Born: 1675; Portsmouth, New Hampshire, British America
- Died: 11 February 1743/1744 (age 69); Falmouth, Maine, British America
- Occupations: Commander in the "East", Colonel of militia, King's mast agent, councilor, mill owner, speculator, innkeeper
- Spouse: Mary Sherburne
- Children: 1
- Military career
- Allegiance: British America
- Rank: Major
- Conflicts: Queen Anne's War; Dummer's War

Colonel Thomas Westbrook (1675–1743/44) was a senior New England militia officer in Maine during Dummer's War. In addition to this senior militia role he was a scout, a colonial councillor, an innkeeper, a mill owner, a land speculator and a King's Mast Agent. He is the namesake of Westbrook, Maine.

== Early years ==
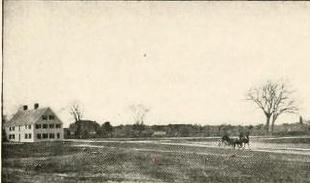
Globe Tavern on the Plains in Portsmouth, New Hampshire

During Queen Anne's War, Westbrook became a ranger in a small company of four (1704).

In 1716 the General Assembly of the Province made a grant to Thomas Westbrook, to keep the only public house at the Plains, in consideration that he should lay out six acres of land for the accommodation of drawing up the militia of the town. From at least 1720 he was the owner and proprietor.

== Father Rale's War ==
During the years 1721-3 Westbrook became a captain in the militia and, after the fall of Colonel Shadrach Walton from favour with Massachusett's acting Governor William Dummer, became the colonel in charge of the militia in the "East" (Maine)

A focus during the Father Rale's War was the New England effort to capture Father Sebastien Rale, a Jesuit priest and French national who resided with and, the New Englanders thought, guided the natives to raid and kill or abduct New England colonists. The General Court of Massachusetts in December 1721 directed the militia to apprehend Rale and bring him to Boston to answer these charges.

=== The Strong Box ===
In January 1722 Colonel Westbrook led a group of militia that, unable to find Rale, seized a strongbox containing his correspondence with Marquis de Vaudreuil, the French Governor in Quebec, and a hand written dictionary of the native Abenaki language. In the minds of New Englanders of the day, the letters proved French complicity in urging Native American tribes to attack New England settlements, and they were conveyed to authorities in Boston.

He was present at the December 15, 1725 Falmouth peace treaty with the Native American's, Dummer's Treaty, which ended the hostilities, apparently his last act as a militia officer.

== Falmouth, Maine ==
He moved to Falmouth (modern Portland, Maine) "as early as 1719" to enter the lucrative business of providing masts to the British navy as a private contractor. He was one of only a few European-descended residents there at that time.

He was appointed as King's Mast Agent in 1727 and moved the "King's mast business" from Portsmouth to Falmouth. The mast agent was charged by the Crown with marking, protecting and providing trees which were suitable for ship's masts in the Royal Navy.

Westbrook "became a citizen" of Falmouth in August 1727. He built his "splendid seat" of "Harrow House" with garrisons on the south side of Stroudwater River on a 69-acre (280,000 m^{2}) property. It was likely at this home that Westbrook entertained Governor Belcher and other guests.

He built two mills, a gristmill whose stones still survive as markers of other historical sites, and a papermill. Native chief Polin travelled to the governor to protest Col. Westbrook's failure to provide a way for spawning fish to get past his mill.

=== Councilor ===
As early as 1710 he was part of the King's Council appointed by the governor, and held his post (though often absent) until 1730 when he resigned voluntarily. In 1733 he was briefly in Boston as a representative to the council from Falmouth and courted by Governor Jonathan Belcher to be a supporter of the Massachusetts government. He showed little interest in these duties and was fined for being absent.

== Business ==
With the young Brigadier General Samuel Waldo (pictured at right) he became a land speculator of as much as 15,000 acres in the Falmouth area (near present-day Portland, Maine). The two partners prospered until, for reasons that are not entirely clear, Waldo "[who had] led him into large land speculations ... then struck upon him in an unfortunate time." "Waldo by unscrupulous or ruthless means divested Westbrook of his lands and much of his wealth by 1743..."

"In 1743, Waldo recovered judgement against him for ten thousand five hundred pounds, which he levied upon his property, and swept it nearly all away."

A copy of one of his later letters, desperately seeking a loan, survived and was transcribed near the end of Trask's Letters of Colonel Thomas Westbrook. Unlike most of his letters, this one was probably not dictated and captures Westbrook's choice of spelling as well as his desperation.

July 29, 1740.

Sir my desterse is so grat I know not how to Turn myself for Want of money. If you cold any Ways helpe me I shall tack it as a favor. Mr. Robrds is going to Portsmouth, and I want to send sum money to Plastd. Pray consider the hard case of your frind and sarvant

... THO. WESTBROOK.

== Death ==
He died heavily in debt on 11 February 1743/1744 "of a broken heart caused by Waldo's Acts". He expired in a smaller cottage adjacent to his beloved Harrow House, which had been lost to his creditors. Despite his bankruptcy his estate was valued at seven thousand, three hundred and two pounds. In contrast, his probate inventory totalled £1052/14/5 and included a house, a pew in Rev Smith's meetinghouse, and books. His Globe Tavern later appears among the property owned by his grandson Thomas Westbrook Waldron though the date of transfer of this property and of his son in law's house is unknown.

"[H]is family was forced to spirit his body away in the middle of a nighttime snowstorm in order to prevent the Waldo family from claiming Westbrook's remains and holding them "hostage" until debts were paid". The burial location was unknown until the 1976 bicentennial celebrations except to descendants of his sister Mary (Westbrook) Knight. The gravesite, located at Smiling Hill Farm, has been marked by the Daughters of Colonial Wars in Maine and is pictured on the Knight family farm's website.

== Family ==
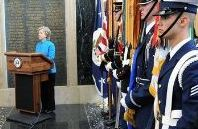
Then-Secretary of State Clinton honours Consul Thomas Westbrook Waldron (a great great grandson) and others

Born in 1675, he was the son of John Westbrook and Martha Walford of Portsmouth, New Hampshire. His siblings included Mary who married Nathan Knight, and whose family continues to own and operate the "Smiling Hill" farm.

Thomas married Mary Sherburne, daughter of the mariner John Sherburne and his wife Mary Cowell. The restored Sherburne house at Portsmouth, New Hampshire's Strawbery Banke, has been identified as theirs. Their only child, Elizabeth, married Richard Waldron (Secretary) of a prominent colonial New Hampshire family.

Though he had no sons, he was the namesake for several descendants all bearing the name "Thomas Westbrook Waldron". A great-great-grandson of this name, a US consul who died in 1844 at Macau, was commemorated in a May 1, 2009 Washington DC ceremony by then-Secretary of State Clinton. The names "Thomas Westbrook" or merely "Westbrook" as given names were in use among descendants well into the twentieth century.

== Legacy ==
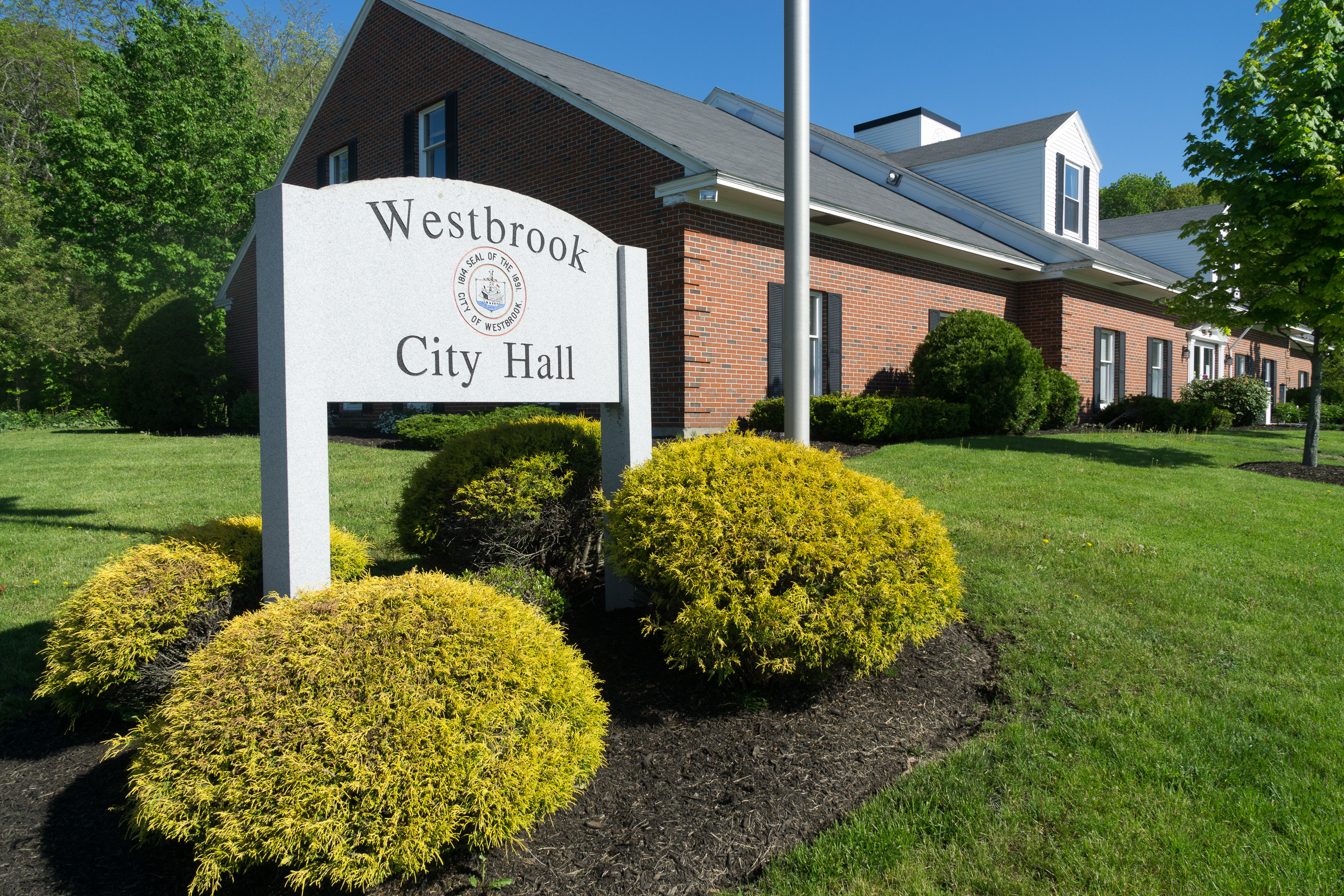
Westbrook City Hall

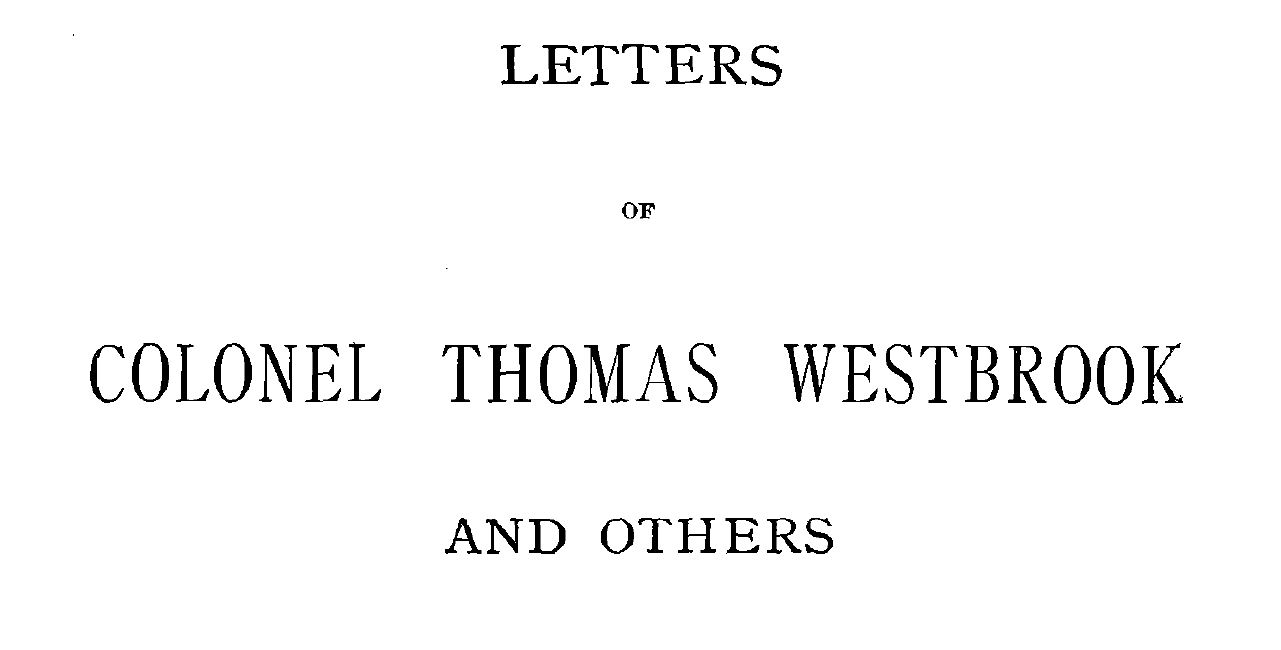
Title page of Letters of Colonel Westbrook

In 1814 the town of Stroudwater was created from Falmouth. Within a couple of months, the town was renamed Westbrook in honour of the Colonel. "...[I]t was a member of the Knight family -the descendants of Westbrook['s sister] who were holding the secret of his burial place - who proposed naming the town after him."

His reports of activities as a militia captain and colonel to Governor Dummer were a series in the New England Historic & Genealogical Register (including vol 44, 1890 to vol 45, 1895) and then published in a book: Letters of Colonel Thomas Westbrook and others relative to Indian affairs in Maine, 1722-1726. This work is often cited as a primary source in histories of that time.
