= Waldron Island =

Unincorporated community in Washington, United States

Waldron
- Unincorporated community
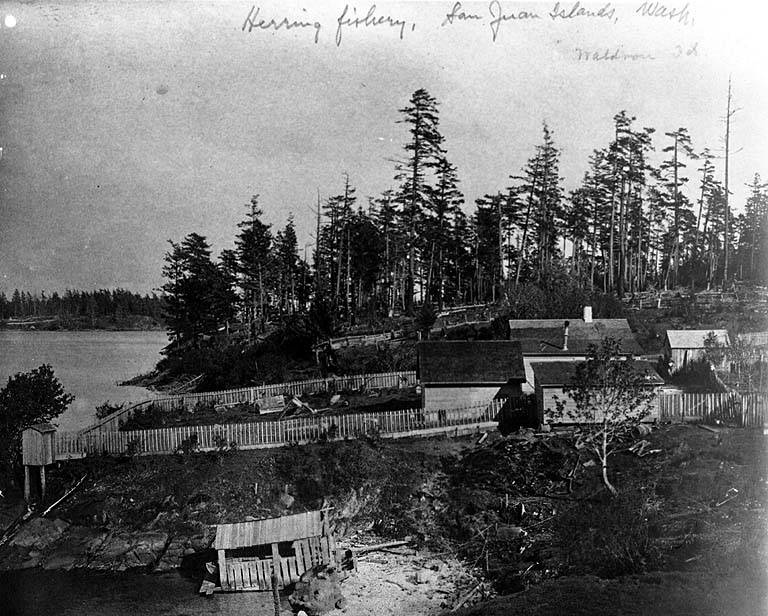
- Herring fishery, Waldron Island, ca 1895

- Location within the San Juan Islands

- Location within the state of Washington
- Coordinates: 48°41′16″N 123°2′8″W
- Country: United States
- State: Washington
- County: San Juan

Area
  - Total: 4.6 sq mi (11.9 km^{2})

Population (2000)
  - Total: 104
  - Density: 22.6/sq mi (8.74/km^{2})
- Time zone: UTC-8 (Pacific (PST))
  - Summer (DST): UTC-7 (PDT)
- ZIP codes: 98297

Waldron, also known as Waldron Island, is an unincorporated community in San Juan County, Washington, United States. Its population was 104 at the 2000 census.

Waldron is in the San Juan Islands. It is designated as a Limited Development District and commercial recreation facilities are prohibited. There is no ferry service, only one county-owned dock, and no electricity or water supply.

== History ==
During a Spanish expedition in 1791, Francisco Eliza named the Island "Lemos." However, the current name of the island was given in May 1841 when Wilkes Expedition officer Lieutenant Case of the Vincennes and his party surveyed Puget Sound. During this survey, one of the San Juan islands was named after one or other of a pair of the Waldron brothers, Richard Russell Waldron and Thomas Westbrook Waldron.

In the nineteenth century Waldron Island sandstone was mined for use in various buildings. Coal deposits were also discovered on Waldron Island. Homesteaders settled the island in the nineteenth century, and the Krumdiack Homestead, built in 1890, is currently listed on the National Register of Historic Places.

In 1941 Waldron resident June Burn featured Waldron prominently in her autobiography Living High and described her family's experience building a log cabin on the island. Her daughter-in-law, Doris Burn, also wrote several books while living on the island. The last store on Waldron closed in 1942 and no regular ferry service has been offered to the island. Since 1976, Waldron has been a 'limited development district'. No large-scale mining of natural resources is allowed, and no large homes or paved roads may be built.

Composer Morten Lauridsen bought "Crum's Castle", the former general store on the island, in 1975, and has composed many of his pieces there.

In 1997 the Drug Enforcement Administration conducted a drug raid on Waldron, confiscating 886 marijuana plants and arresting 7 people.

== Geography ==
Waldron is an island of irregular shape with a land area of 4.6 sq mi (11.9 km^{2}).

=== Climate ===
This region experiences warm and dry summers, with no average monthly temperatures above 71.6 °F. According to the Köppen Climate Classification system, Waldron has a warm-summer Mediterranean climate, abbreviated "Csb" on climate maps.

Climate data for Waldron, Washington
Month	Jan	Feb	Mar	Apr	May	Jun	Jul	Aug	Sep	Oct	Nov	Dec	Year
Mean daily maximum °C (°F)	8 (46)	8 (47)	11 (51)	13 (55)	16 (61)	19 (66)	21 (70)	21 (70)	18 (65)	13 (56)	9 (49)	7 (45)	14 (57)
Mean daily minimum °C (°F)	4 (39)	4 (39)	6 (42)	7 (44)	9 (49)	11 (52)	13 (55)	13 (56)	12 (53)	9 (48)	6 (43)	4 (39)	8 (47)
Average precipitation mm (inches)	97 (3.8)	71 (2.8)	56 (2.2)	48 (1.9)	43 (1.7)	36 (1.4)	23 (0.9)	28 (1.1)	25 (1)	64 (2.5)	110 (4.4)	79 (3.1)	680 (26.9)
Source: Weatherbase

== Demographics ==
As of the census of 2000, there were 104 people, 62 households, and 27 families residing in the unincorporated town. The racial makeup of the city was 95.19% White, 0.96% Asian, and 3.85% from two or more races.
