= Thomas Westbrook Waldron (consul) =

First United States consul to Hong Kong (1814–1844)

Thomas W. Waldron
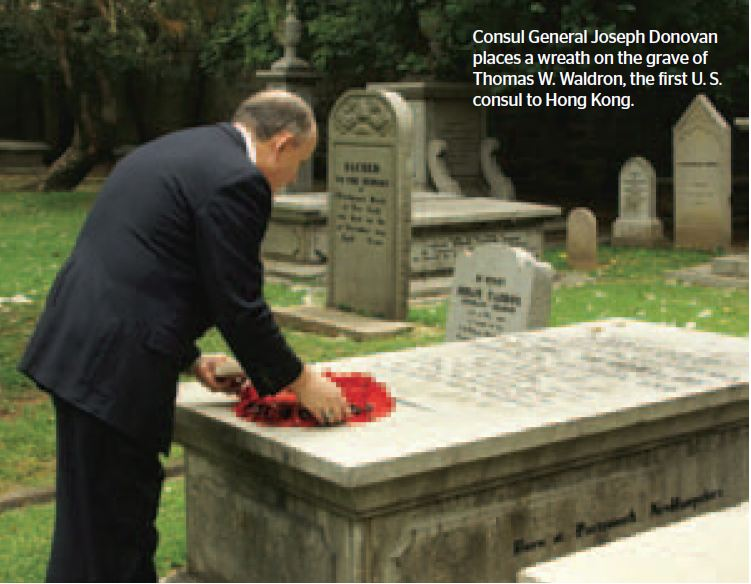
- Wreath laying at Waldron's grave

United States Consul to Hong Kong and Macau
- In office July 21, 1843 – September 8, 1844
- President: John Tyler
- Preceded by: Office established
- Succeeded by: Frederick Busch

Personal details
- Born: Thomas Westbrook Waldron; May 1, 1814 United States
- Died: September 18, 1844 (aged 30) Macau
- Resting place: Old Protestant Cemetery, Macau
- Parent(s): Daniel Waldron and Olive Sheafe
- Occupation: Captain's clerk, U.S. Navy; U.S. Consul to Hong Kong, naval store keeper to the US East India Squadron

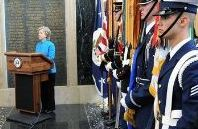
Secretary of State honors Consul Thomas Westbrook Waldron and others

Thomas Westbrook Waldron (1814–1844) was a captain's clerk on the Wilkes Expedition, and the first United States consul to Hong Kong. His service to the U.S. consular service was honored by Secretary of State Hillary Clinton during a ceremony in 2009.

== Family ==
Waldron was born May 1, 1814, the youngest of eight children of Daniel Waldron and Olive Huske Sheafe Waldron of Dover, New Hampshire. He was named after his grandfather, Thomas Westbrook Waldron. An older cousin of the same name had moved away prior to his birth.

== Wilkes Expedition ==
With his older brother Richard he joined the Wilkes Expedition, which explored a portion of the coast of Antarctica, some of the Pacific islands, and the coast of what is now Washington state. Waldron Glacier in the Antarctic is named after him. Waldron Island is named after him or his brother.

== U.S. Consul to Hong Kong and Macau ==
In December 1843 he was nominated by President John Tyler to the office of United States consul to Hong Kong. He traveled to neighboring Macau on official business, where he died on September 18, 1844 after contracting cholera. He is buried in the Old Protestant Cemetery in Macau.

== 2009 ceremony ==
On May 1, 2009, as part of a ceremony honoring several diplomats who died on duty, he was honored by Secretary of State Hillary Clinton. A second ceremony occurred the same month at his burial site at the Old Protestant Cemetery, Macau.

== Landmarks ==
Waldron Glacier is named after him. Waldron Island in the San Juan Islands off of Puget Sound is named either after he or his brother Richard.
