= Waldron Cutting =

Coordinates: 50.947°N 0.207°E

- Site of Special Scientific Interest
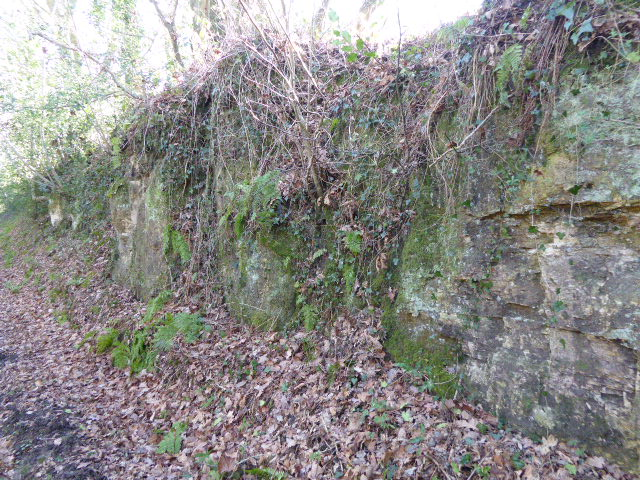
- Location of Waldron Cutting.
- Area of search: East Sussex
- Grid reference: TQ 551 187
- Interest: Geological
- Area: 0.2 hectares (0.49 acres)
- Notification date: 1990
- Location map: Magic Map

Waldron Cutting is a 0.2-hectare (0.49-acre) geological Site of Special Scientific Interest in East Sussex. It is a Geological Conservation Review site.

This site exposes siltstones and fine sandstone of the Ashdown Formation, dating to the Early Cretaceous between 140 and 100 million years ago. It has one metre long fossils of Lycopodites plants in life position.

This very small site is on both sides of a public road.
