= Cape Waldron =

Cape Waldron (66°34′S 115°33′E) is an ice-covered cape in Antarctica, just westward of Totten Glacier. It was delineated by Gardner Dean Blodgett (1955) from aerial photographs taken by USN Operation Highjump (1946–47), and named by the Advisory Committee on Antarctic Names (US-ACAN) for R. R. Waldron, purser on the sloop USS Vincennes of the United States Exploring Expedition (1838–42) under Lt. Charles Wilkes.
