= Richard Waldron (colonel) =

- Born: 1650; Dover, New Hampshire
- Died: 3 November 1730 (age 80); Portsmouth, New Hampshire
- Occupations: merchant, judge, councilor, mill owner, Colonel of the New Hampshire militia, Secretary of the Province of New Hampshire
- Spouse(s): Hannah Cutt, Eleanor Vaughan
- Children: Samuel, Richard, Margaret, William, Ann, Abigail, Eleanor (Note: Daughter Eleanor died age 20 "from the effects of drinking too much cold water after dancing)
- Parent: Richard Walderne

Richard Waldron (1650 – 3 November 1730) was a military officer, politician, and business figure of the Province of New Hampshire. He maintained the position of the Waldron family in Dover and colonial New Hampshire through intermarriage with other leading families and inheritance or purchase of many of the positions once held by his father. He was the first of his line to adopt "Waldron" as opposed to "Walderne", the spelling that his father and previous generations had used.

== Birth and offices ==
Richard Waldron was born in 1650 in Dover, New Hampshire. "A son of Major Richard Waldron, [he] ... early removed to Portsmouth. He was chosen a representative in the General Assembly in 1691, and a member of the Royal Council in 1692. He was a justice of the Court of Common Pleas from 1702 until 1706; judge of Probate from 1708 to 1730, and held the commission of Colonel in the Provincial Militia. Col. Waldron's mercantile education was received in Charlestown, Mass., under George Willoughby."

The Dominion of New England which encompassed all of New England in 1686 "seemed willing to cooperate with any individuals among the local elite who accepted their rule. Richard Waldron Jr., for example, purchased several offices which left him with formal authority in Dover almost as great as that previously exercised by his aging father."

== Family ==
Coat of Arms of Richard Waldron

Waldron' first wife was Hannah, daughter of President John Cutt. She died in childbirth on February 14, 1682; their infant son and only child, Samuel, died 11 months later.

Waldron re-married at Portsmouth on 6 February 1692/3 to Eleanor (or Ellenor), daughter of Major William Vaughan, grand niece of John Cutt, and a cousin (once removed) of Hannah. Waldron's children with his second wife included Richard, who also had a significant political career in New Hampshire.

== Contest with natives ==
He "was busy fighting Indians." In 1704 "a group of marauding Abenakis and Penacooks went after Richard Waldron, Jr. at his home in Dover, and although the provincial leader was not at home, killed several other colonists in the neighbourhood."

== Ousted ==
"Very shortly after [1715] Colonel Waldron and his friends succeeded in giving the Lieutenant-Governor Usher his quietus, but in the moment of victory the colonel was dismissed from the Council for being "very much concern'd" in stealing the king's mast timber. He retained his place as judge of common pleas, Secretary of the Province of New Hampshire, and clerk of the Council, however, finding means to shift the duties and salary of the last to [his son] Richard, until on 11 January 1716/17, he had him officially sworn into that office."

Waldron died on 3 November 1730 in Dover.
