= Richard Waldron (secretary) =

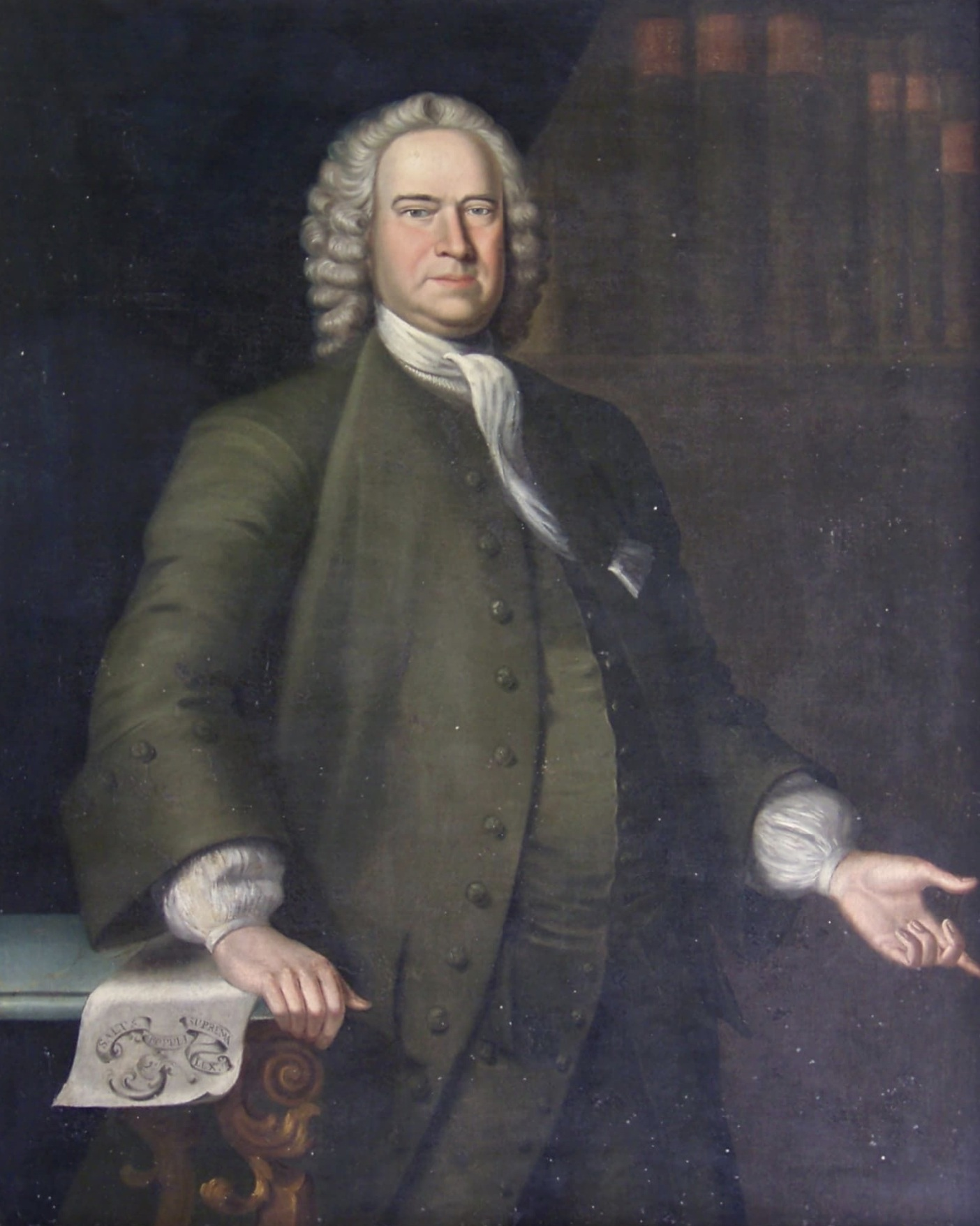
- Portrait by John Greenwood, 1751
- Born: February 21, 1694; Dover, New Hampshire
- Died: August 23, 1753 (aged 59); Portsmouth, New Hampshire
- Occupations: Secretary of colonial New Hampshire and merchant, magistrate, councilor, mill owner, Major of the New Hampshire militia and speaker of the colonial New Hampshire assembly
- Spouse: Elizabeth Westbrook
- Children: Richard Waldron IV, Thomas Westbrook Waldron, William, Elizabeth, George, Elizabeth, Elinor, William
- Parent(s): Richard Waldron (colonel) and Elinor Vaughan

Richard Waldron (February 21, 1694 – August 23, 1753) was an American politician and merchant and a major opponent of the Wentworth oligarchy in the Province of New Hampshire. He supported a continued political subordination of New Hampshire to Massachusetts and opposed moves to separation from this traditional senior partner. Through his friendship with Massachusetts governor and kinsman Jonathan Belcher and his positions of secretary, councillor, and New Hampshire assembly speaker, for a time he was "the central authority" in colonial New Hampshire politics.

== Family ==
Coat of Arms of Richard Waldron

A son of Colonel Richard Waldron, grandson of Major Richard Waldron, and nephew of New Hampshire Lieutenant-Governor George Vaughan, he married Elizabeth, only child of Colonel Thomas Westbrook, on 31 Dec 1718, and by this marriage further enhanced the position of the Waldron family in New Hampshire.

Most of their six children died early, including Harvard-educated Richard, the eldest, who was lost at sea in 1745, aged 25; this left only sons Thomas and George to live long into adulthood.

== Youth ==
In the summer of 1694 the young Waldron and his parents narrowly escaped the massacre of his great-aunt Cutt and household at the Pulpitt Farm.

At about age 15 he entered Harvard College, graduating in 1712 and continuing another three years in a master's program that prepared him for law. On the eve of commencement for 1711 he and another student "conducted themselves in such a manner that the scandalized authorities the next morning denied John Wainwright [who was a year older and ready to graduate] his degree. Richard had conveniently gone home but in October he had to face the music:"

Waldron returning to College after his absence in the Vacation, was publickly adminish'd, and made a publick Confession in the Hall upon his Exorbitance committed before the Commencement.

== Career ==
While still a graduate student he, together with some other graduates, signed the Treaty of Portsmouth in 1713.

He "was graduated from Harvard College in 1712. ... He was a member of the Royal Council for New Hampshire in 1728; Secretary of the Province of New Hampshire for a long period (1730–1741) during the administration of Governor Belcher; judge of the Probate from 1737 to 1742, and representative in the General Assembly in 1749, of which body he was unanimously chosen speaker."

== Opposition to the Wentworths ==
"[Richard Waldron's] house was built with taste and elegance for those days"

"... [A] major opponent of the Wentworth oligarchy until his death in 1753," reads a caption to his portrait printed in Colonial New Hampshire - A History. By contrast, his son was considered a "friend" of the last of the three Governors Wentworth.

He "witnessed, during 1716–1717, the political coup, wangled by Samuel Penhallow and John Wentworth, which removed all his relatives, including his father and uncle, from positions of political authority in the colony. Emerging from this coup with the council clerk office intact, he was frustrated and vengeful. For the next thirty-five years he sought both to restore and to maintain himself, his family, and his friends in positions of leadership in New Hampshire during an era of economic and social change."

== Alliance with Governor Belcher ==
Waldron became a fast friend of new governor Jonathan Belcher and "was the right hand with which Governor Belcher pounded Colonel David Dunbar, Lieutenant-Governor of New Hampshire." "During the 1730s Waldron, described by ... Dunbar as a "pert, little attorney," was the central figure in New Hampshire politics, acquiring more offices (judge of probate and naval officer), writing all the council and "party" documents, and executing the policies of Belcher's administration. The Belcher-Waldron faction controlled the executive and the council, while the Wentworth clan gained control of the assembly after 1731 as the inland town leaders, having achieved their goals, became complacent."

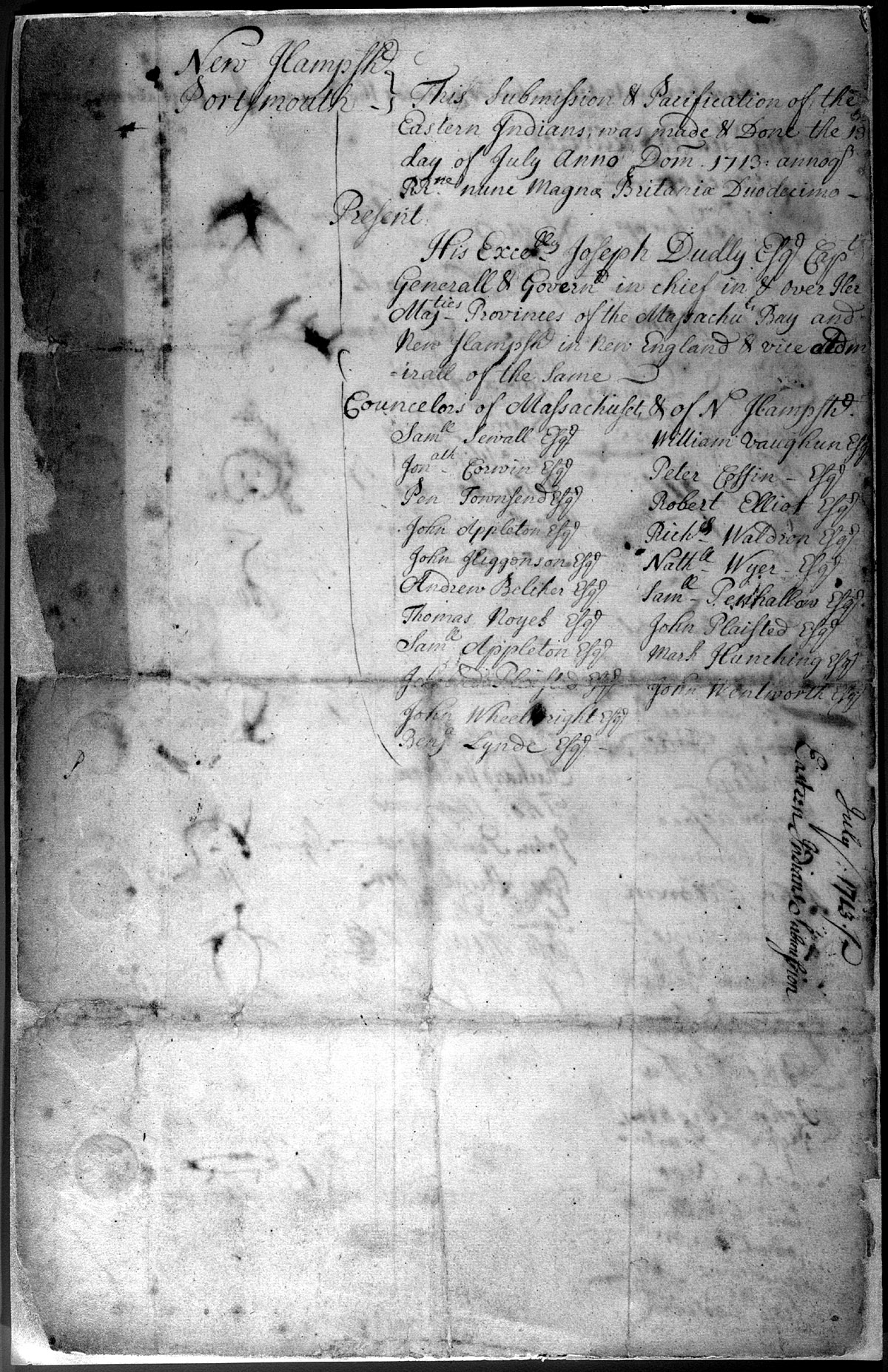
Signatures on page 4 of the Treaty of Portsmouth

After some years during which Waldron "practically ruled New Hampshire in the name of the absent Governor and in defiance of the Lieutenant-Governor" Dunbar, Belcher and Waldron were replaced in their respective roles. "In 1741 Shirley succeeded Belcher in Massachusetts and Benning Wentworth ... became Governor of New Hampshire. The new executive's first act was to consolidate his position and avenge his and his father's sufferings at the hands of Belcher and Waldron. He suspended the secretary from the Council...." Waldron wrote bitterly:

Nothing remarkable has occurred since my last, onely a rumour in the Town, that there was no bending or bringing of me too; that I had drawn a Party to me, and stopp'd the busyness of the Generall Court, and was like to breed a Mutiny in the Council. Indeed I opposed the oppropriating of the excise to the Governours salary, as it was a General Grant to the King by a perpetual Act, for answering the incidents of Government. 'Tis said things go along harmoniously now I am out of the way.

== Representative and speaker ==
"Intensely ambitious, however, Waldron schemed, maneuvered, and conspired ineffectually, from 1742 until his death, to regain his lost authority. As he put it in 1742, "I sing but low notes at present, perhaps they may hear a tune heretofor which will grate in their ears."

Just as Waldron had decided to move away, he was unexpectedly elected a Representative from Hampton, and was almost unanimously elected speaker. "The Governor negatived the choice, but the House stood by it, and for three years there was a deadlock. In twenty sessions the legislature passed only one bill." '[T]he World acknowledges [Waldron] to be a Master of Eloquence." However, after three years the House tired of holding up business for a family quarrel, and he was not reelected as speaker, and he soon resigned as Representative.

== Analysis ==
Sibley's states that Waldron was hampered in his aim to go to England to make his case by a lack of contributed money from supporters. But Van Deventer states that Waldron should have absorbed the cost personally: "If Waldron had been willing to travel to England (as his old friend Belcher advised), to spend money there freely, and to attack the Wentworth clan and John Thomlinson for their profiteering through violations of the White Pine [royal navy mast] laws, he might have succeeded. But he was not and did not--his ambitions stopped at the water's edge--and Wentworth ... emerg[ed] from the conflict in 1752 with a complete victory. ..."

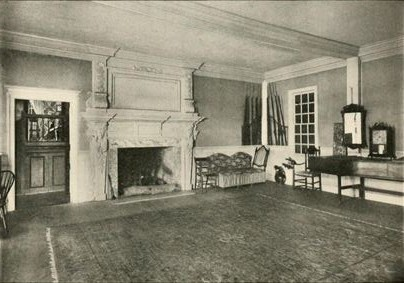
Council Chambers in the Wentworth mansion where Wentworth presided over provincial council meetings and where a copy of Waldron's portrait once hung

"For eleven years Waldron achieved his goals as the central authority in New Hampshire politics. Moreover, the Waldron-Belcher countercoup of the 1730s and Waldron's attempt to regain power in the late 1740s had lasting impacts in New Hampshire. His actions during the 1730s helped to bring about what he sought to avoid. By provoking a desperate and ultimately successful Wentworth clan opposition, his actions led to extensive boundary changes, a separate New Hampshire governorship, and the total triumph of the Wentworth faction. His ambitions in the 1740s helped strengthen both Crown prerogatives over the assembly and a Wentworth family government that would last until the American Revolution."

== Portrait ==
A portrait by John Greenwood now hangs in the Governor John Langdon House in Portsmouth, New Hampshire with that of his wife. Copies previously hung in the "Council Chamber" of the Wentworth-Coolidge Mansion. These copies suffered at the hands of the children of later residents of the Wentworth-Coolidge Mansion, who admitted they "mischievously touched up the [portraits] with fence paint!".
