= List of oldest companies in the United States =

This list of the oldest companies in the United States includes brands and companies, excluding associations, educational, government or religious organizations. To be listed, a brand or company name must remain, either whole or in part, since inception. To limit the scope of this list, only companies established before 1820 are listed. If the original name has since changed due to acquisitions or renaming, this must be verifiable. Entries in grey indicate that the companies have endured some significant change in their status or condition.

Year	Company	Location	Field	Reference	Notes
1613	Shirley Plantation	Charles City County, Virginia	Farm		
1623	Avedis Zildjian Company	Norwell, Massachusetts	Music company		Founded in Istanbul, moved to the U.S. in 1929.
1632–1633	Tuttle's Red Barn	Dover, New Hampshire	Farm		
1639	Field View Farm	Orange, Connecticut	Farm		
1642	Barker's Farm	North Andover, Massachusetts	Farm		
1648–1651, 1662 (as retail)	Shirokiya	Honolulu, Hawaii	Lacquer, retail		Founded in Tokyo, moved to the U.S. in 1958. Defunct in 2021.
1667	Seaside Inn	Kennebunkport, Maine	Hotel		
1670	Hudson's Bay Company	New York City	Retail		Founded in England by Royal Charter, headquartered today in Toronto and New York City. Liquidated in 2025.
1673	White Horse Tavern	Newport, Rhode Island	Restaurant		
1680	Saunderskill	Accord, New York	Farm		
1690	Towle Silversmiths	Boston, Massachusetts	Silversmith		Absorbed by Lifetime Brands, Inc.
1702	J.E. Rhoads & Sons	Marple, Pennsylvania (found.)	Tannery		Closed 2009; now a brand of Mid Atlantic Industrial Belting Inc.
1705	The John Stevens Shop	Newport, Rhode Island	Stone carver		
1711	Orchards of Concklin	Pomona, New York	Orchard		
1720s	Smiling Hill Farm	Westbrook, Maine	Farm (and lumber mill since 1970s)		
1725	Pottstown Roller Mill	Pottstown, Pennsylvania	Grain, Feed		Now owned by Purina Mills.
1736	Lakeside Mills	Spindale, North Carolina	Corn products		
1741	Lyman Orchards	Middlefield, Connecticut	Farm, Orchard & Golf Courses		
1741	WD Cowls	Amherst, Massachusetts	Lumber		
1752	The Philadelphia Contributionship	Philadelphia, Pennsylvania	Insurance		
1752	Caswell-Massey	Newport, Rhode Island (found.)	Perfume		Sold 2003–2007; re-branded 2017.
1760	Lorillard Tobacco Company	New York City (found.)	Tobacco		Defunct 2016; brand owned by Reynolds American.
1764–1765	Baker's	Dorchester, Massachusetts (found.)	Chocolate, confectionery		Now a brand of Kraft Heinz.
1764	The Hartford Courant	Hartford, Connecticut	Newspaper		
1767	McCrady's Tavern and Long Room	Charleston, South Carolina	Restaurant		Closed 2020.
1774	Ames	Chicopee, Massachusetts	Manufacturing		By 1907, the Ames foundries had been purchased by Chicopee's A.G. Spalding Company.
1776	The Griswold Inn	Essex, Connecticut	Restaurant and Hotel		
1778	Dowse Orchards	Sherborn, Massachusetts	Farm		
1778	The Greenbrier	White Sulphur Springs, West Virginia	Hotel		
1778	Willow Grove Inn	Orange, Virginia	Hotel		
1779	Old Talbott Tavern	Bardstown, Kentucky	Hotel		
1780	Laird & Company	Colts Neck Township, New Jersey	Distillery		
1782	Levi Garrett	New York City (found.)	Chewing tobacco		Now a brand of the American Snuff Company.
1783	Rawle & Henderson LLP	Philadelphia, Pennsylvania	Law firm		
1784	D. Landreth Seed Company	Philadelphia, Pennsylvania (found.)	Seeds		
1784	Bank of New York	New York City	Bank		Merged 2007 into The Bank of New York Mellon.
1785	Bixler's	Allentown, Pennsylvania	Jewelry		
1785	Turpin Farms	Cincinnati, Ohio (found.)	Farm		
1786	Pittsburgh Post-Gazette	Pittsburgh, Pennsylvania	Newspaper		
1790	King Arthur Flour	Boston, Massachusetts (found.)	Flour and baking		Now based in Norwich, Vermont.
1792	Cadwalader, Wickersham & Taft	New York City	Law firm		
1792	Insurance Company of North America	Philadelphia, Pennsylvania (found.)	Insurance		Now Chubb Limited
1792	New York Stock Exchange	New York City	Stock Exchange		
1792	Old Farmer's Almanac	Dublin, New Hampshire	Almanac		
1792	State Street	Boston, Massachusetts	Banking		
1794	Baltimore Equitable	Baltimore, Maryland	Insurance		
1794	Rochester Cables	Culpeper, Virginia	Cables		Now a brand of TE Connectivity.
1794	Warner Company	Wilmington, Delaware	Mining		Defunct.
1795	Murray, Draper, Fairman & Co	Philadelphia, Pennsylvania	Manufacturing		Merged 1858 into the American Banknote Corporation
1795	Dixon	Jersey City, New Jersey (found.)	Pencils		Now based in Lake Mary, Florida.
1795	Jim Beam	Clermont, Kentucky	Distillery		
1796	Shreve, Crump & Low	Boston, Massachusetts	Jewelry		Brownstone at 39 Newbury Street, Boston Massachusetts with Elevator (1-617-267-9100) Accessibility
1797	The Birkett Mills	Penn Yan, New York	Mill-Buckwheat products		Based in Penn Yan, New York
1797	J. Gruber's Hagerstown Town & Country Almanack	Hagerstown, Maryland	Almanack		
1797	Wayside Inn	Middletown, Virginia	Hotel		
1798	Alan McIlvain	Philadelphia, Pennsylvania (found.)	Sawmill		
1798–1809	Pratt-Read	Ivoryton, Connecticut	Tools		
1798	W. Rose	Blockley Township, Pennsylvania	Tools		
1800	Washington Trust Company	Westerly, Rhode Island	Bank		
1801	Crane & Co.	Dalton, Massachusetts	Papermaking		Now a subsidiary of Crane Co.
1801	Revere Copper Company	Canton, Massachusetts (found.)	Copper Processing		Now based in Rome, New York.
1802	DuPont	Wilmington, Delaware	Chemicals		Merged 2017 into DuPont de Nemours, Inc.
1803	Wawa	New Jersey	Iron Foundry		Has since become convenience stores
1803	Golden Lamb Inn	Lebanon, Ohio	Restaurant		The oldest restaurant in Ohio
1806	Colgate	New York City	Consumer goods		
1807	Wiley	New York City (found.)	Publisher		Now based in Hoboken, New Jersey.
1810	Black, Starr & Frost	New York City	Jeweler		
1810	The Hartford	Hartford, Connecticut	Financial		
1811	Pfaltzgraff	York County, Pennsylvania	Tableware		Sold to Lifetime Brands, Inc. in 2005. Only Internet presence.
1811	Davenport Peters	Boston, Massachusetts	Lumber		Defunct 1991.
1812	City Bank of New York	New York City	Bank		Now Citigroup
1812	House-Autry Mills	Four Oaks, North Carolina	Food products (cornmeal, mixes, breaders)		Founded as a gristmill in Newton Grove, NC; merged with Autry Brothers Mill in 1967. Produces cornmeal, breaders, and hushpuppy mixes.
1813	ContiGroup	Arlon (then Belgium.)	Food		Expanded to the U.S. in 1921.
1813	Seth Thomas	Plymouth Hollow, Connecticut	Clockmaker		Defunct. Now a brand of CST Enterprises.
1815	Louisville Stoneware	Louisville, Kentucky	Pottery		
1815	The Repository	Canton, Ohio	Newspaper		Oldest continuously published newspaper in Ohio
1816	Hodgdon Yachts	East Boothbay, Maine	Yachts		
1816	The York Water Company	York, Pennsylvania	Water utility		
1816	Remington	Ilion, New York	Firearms; typewriters		
1816	Stark Brothers Nurseries and Orchards	Louisiana, Missouri	Farm		
1817	Harper	New York City	Publishing		Merged 1989 into HarperCollins.
1817	JB & Son	Providence, Rhode Island	Apothecary/Druggist		1873 renamed to The Claflin Company.
1818	Breck's	Boston, Massachusetts (found.)	Flowers		Acquired by Gardens Alive!
1818	Libbey Incorporated	Toledo, Ohio	Glassware		Formerly Libbey Glass Company and New England Glass Company
1818	Brooks Brothers	New York City	The oldest apparel/clothing brand in continuous operation in the United States.	Founder = Henry Sands Brooks	filed for bankruptcy protection in July 2020. In September 2020 Brooks Brothers was purchased by a joint venture between Authentic Brands Group and Simon Property Group.
1818	Brown Bros. & Co.	Philadelphia, Pennsylvania (found.)	Bank		Merged 1931 into Brown Brothers Harriman & Co.
1818	Marshall Elevator	Pittsburgh, Pennsylvania (found.)	Elevators		Acquired by Otis.
1819	Jacob Bromwell	Cincinnati, Ohio (found.)	Housewares		Incorporated on 1883.
1819	Cravath, Swaine & Moore	New York City	Law firm		
1826	George Tiemann & Co.	Smithtown, NY	Surgical Instruments		Family owned
1875	Mueller Roofing Distributors	Cincinnati	Roofing Distributor		

== See also ==
- List of oldest companies
- List of oldest companies in Australia
