= Bayley House =

Historic house in Massachusetts, United States

Coordinates: 42°20′57.64″N 71°11′17.01″W

- U.S. National Register of Historic Places
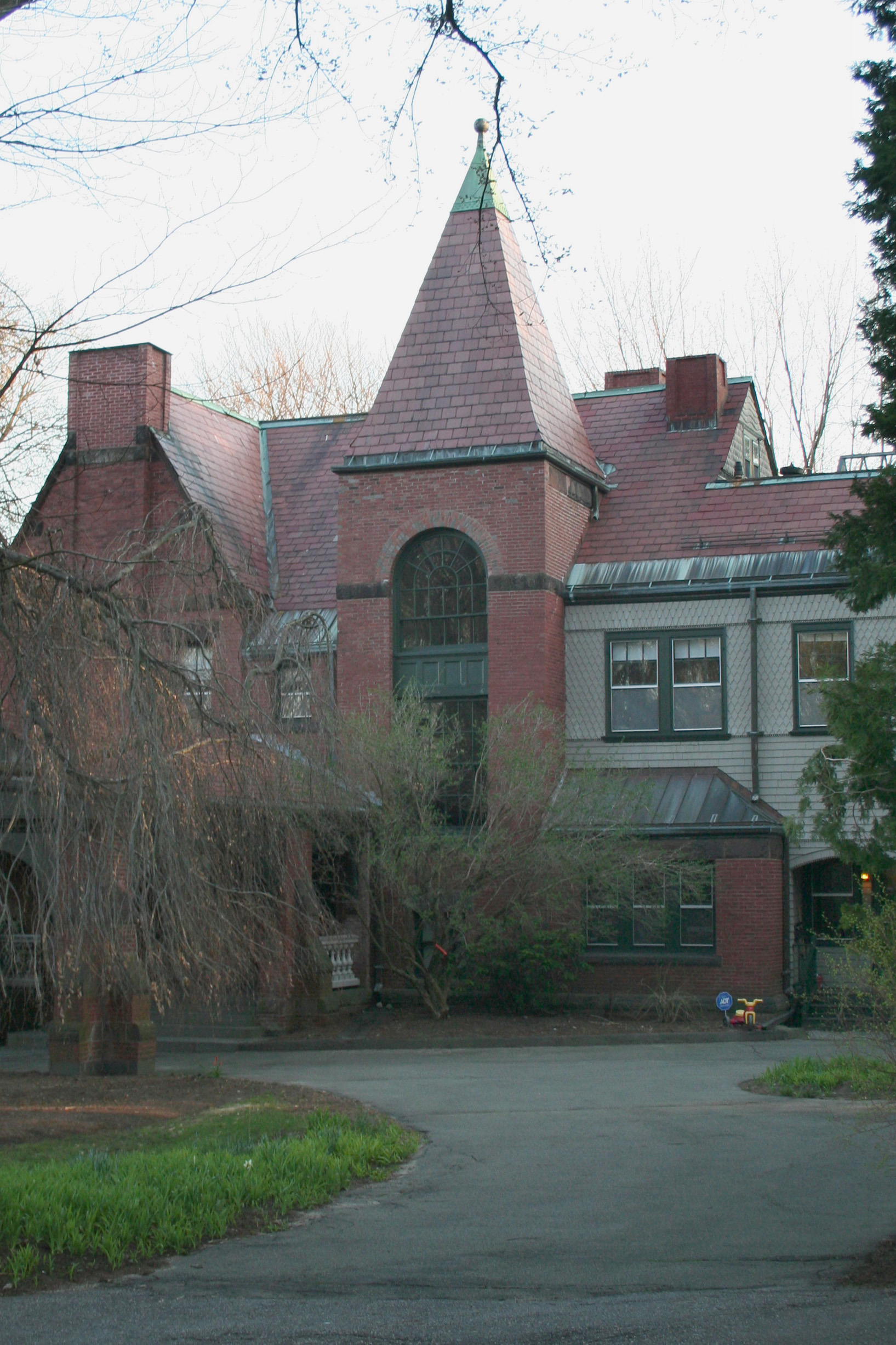
- Location: 16 Fairmont Avenue, Newtonville, Massachusetts
- Built: 1883–1884
- Architect: Peabody and Stearns
- Architectural style: Ruskinian Gothic
- NRHP reference No.: 86001771
- Added to NRHP: October 4, 1986

The Bayley House is a historic house at 16 Fairmont Avenue in Newtonville, Massachusetts, US. Built in 1883–84, it is a prominent example of Ruskinian Gothic architecture, designed by the noted firm of Peabody and Stearns. It was listed on the National Register of Historic Places in 1986.

== Description ==
The Bayley House stands in a residential area roughly midway between the villages of Newtonville and Newton Corner, on the south side of Fairmont Avenue, a short way west of its junction with Centre Street. It is a large 2 1/2-story building, built of brick, freestone, red slate, and wood. It has irregular and asymmetric massing typical of the Queen Anne period, including a tower with steeply pitched pyramidal roof at one corner. Its main gables are adorned with stucco and half-timbering. A single-story porch extends around parts of the building, with balustrades; a porte-cochere provides access to the main entrance via a semicircular drive. The original carriage house, located at the southwest corner of the property, was torn down in the 1930s when that corner of the lot was sold off and a house was built on the site (on Lombard Street). The original lot extended east to Centre Street, three houses were built in the 1920s on those perimeter lots along Centre St, an additional two houses were built on perimeter lots on Lombard St. in the 1930s. The current owners added a freestanding garage in 2018. The landscape design of the property is said to have been done by William Manning, working for Frederick Law Olmsted.

== History ==
The Bayley House was designed and built in 1883–84 by the Boston-based architectural firm of Peabody and Stearns, noted for its commercial and residential architecture in the late 19th century. The house was commissioned by James C. Bayley, a Boston shoe merchant who died within months after ground was broken in late 1883. Bayley's widow, Martha R. Bayley, oversaw the completion of the house, but she and her young children never moved in.

The first occupants of the house were the family of Cyrus Anderson, who lived there from 1884 to 1897. Subsequent owners were the Luther Adams family (wife Lizzie), from 1897 through approximately 1901. Adams was a wine merchant in Boston. Also residing with them were daughters Fanny M. and Mabel Adams. Luther Adams died in 1901 at age 68. The house was occupied by Mr. and Mrs. Edgar P. Van Etten (President, Boston and Albany Railroad) in 1903.

From approximately 1905 to approximately 1919, the home was owned by the Charles H. Breck family who formerly lived at 62 Bellevue Street in Newton. Breck was in the agricultural tools business at 51 North Market in Boston, known as Joseph Breck & Company (now called Breck's, founded by his grandfather Joseph Breck and his father, Charles H.B. Breck). Mrs. Charles H. Breck (Marion A.) was a daughter of Luther Adams. Her sister Fanny also lived here. Other children included Charles H. Breck Jr. and Luther J. Breck.

From 1919 to 1925, the home was owned by the John H. O'Brien family, O'Brien was in the wool business at 619 Atlantic Avenue, Boston; his wife was the former Emma M. Matthews. Their children included Byron H. O'Brien and Arnold N. O'Brien. (Arnold, a coal dealer, was born in Dorchester in 1906 and married Helen F. Priest in Keene, New Hampshire on June 10, 1933.)

On a 1929 map of Newton, the home is owned by Christopher C. Crowell, a well-known developer and builder of homes in Newton. Land at the perimeters of the lot have been subdivided and start to show homes on them (northeast corner lot at Centre and Fairmont, southeast corner lot at Centre and Lombard). The carriage house still shows on the southwest corner of the lot, that piece of land has not yet been subdivided. There is no evidence that Crowell actually lived in the house, but rather that he purchased it from the O'Brien family for development of the land.

From 1931 through 1945, the home was used as the Damon Hall Junior College, run by Frank and Annie Damon. The house was lost in foreclosure to the Charlestown Five Cents Savings Bank, the mortgage holder.

A private family (John Ronne, an attorney) purchased the home in foreclosure and then lived in the home from 1945 until approximately 1967 when it was sold to R. Lewis Wright and Sarah G. Wright. The Wrights owned the home from 1967 to 1970, when it was sold to the religious order of Stigmatine Fathers, a Catholic religious congregation of priests and brothers. The order also owned the house next door at 36 Fairmont Avenue. The Stigmatine Fathers owned the home until 1984.

The house was returned to use as a private residence in 1984, and has been owned by the current residents since 2022.

It was added to the National Register of Historic Places on October 4, 1986.

== See also ==
- National Register of Historic Places listings in Newton, Massachusetts
