= Joseph Breck =

Joseph Breck may refer to:

- Joseph Breck (businessman) (1794–1873), Massachusetts businessman and gardener
- Joseph Breck (curator) (1885–1933), assistant director of Metropolitan Museum of Art and director of The Cloisters
- Joseph Berry Breck (1828–1865), U.S. Navy officer
- Joseph Peter Breck (1929–2012), American character actor
