= Peter Bohlender =

Peter Bohlender (born February 1, 1838) was a Bavarian-born American gardener. He emigrated to Dayton, Ohio, from the Kingdom of Bavaria, with his family, at the age of 6. Having no opportunity to attend school, he worked in a tobacco stripping house at a very young age. Before reaching his teens, he worked for a local nursery, where he received training in the gardening industry. In 1849, he started his own small nursery in North Dayton, Ohio, called Bohlender’s Nursery.

In 1889, Bohlender moved his nursery to Tipp City, Ohio. Around the time of World War I, Bohlender renamed the nursery “Spring Hill Nurseries.” He derived the name “Spring Hill” from a small hill located near the current location of the nursery’s primary growing area.

Spring Hill Nurseries was initially a wholesale garden store, providing plants and services to locals. The rise in popularity of catalog mail-order prompted Bohlender to begin moving Spring Hill out of the wholesale gardening business and into mail-order. In 1930, Spring Hill became primarily a mail-order gardening company. The garden center retained a smaller retail store, which is still functioning today.
