= Richard Martyn (New Hampshire politician) =

American politician

Member of the Massachusetts General Court representing Portsmouth
- In office 1672–1673
- Preceded by: Elias Stileman
- Succeeded by: Richard Cutt
- In office 1679–1679
- Preceded by: Elias Stileman
- Succeeded by: Office Abolished

Speaker of the New Hampshire House of Representatives
- In office 1692–1692
- Preceded by: Richard Waldron, Jr.
- Succeeded by: John Gilman

Personal details
- Born: 1629 Stoke-in-Teignhead, Devon, England
- Died: April 2, 1694 (aged 64–65) Portsmouth, New Hampshire
- Spouse(s): Sarah (née Tuttle) m.1653 d.unk Martha (née Symonds) m.1672 d.1692 Elizabeth (née Gibbons) m.unk d.1683 Mary m.c.1691 d.1724

Richard Martyn or Martin (1630–1694) was a leading figure in early New Hampshire, in business, church and government. He is significant for being a member of the leading group of Puritans who opposed the land claims of Robert Tufton Mason and who advocated for the continued administration of New Hampshire by Massachusetts.

== Early life ==
Richard Martin was born in Stoke-in-Teignhead and came to New England during the Great Migration. He arrived with at least his brother, Michael.

When his brother later died in 1682 and was buried at Copp's Hill Burying Ground, his grave stone had a coat of arms which implies that the family was of the English aristocracy. The arms are of Martyn of Exeter and Kemys, Pembrokeshire "Argent two bars Gules."

Martyn was a merchant. In 1671 he was instrumental in helping John Cutt convince Joshua Moody to stay in Portsmouth as its resident reverent. He was one of the founding members of the first church in Portsmouth.

== Career ==
=== Portsmouth ===
He started his career in local politics. In 1675 to 1677, he served as served as a member of the Portsmouth board of selectman and as Commissioner for the Trial of Small Causes for Norfolk County, Massachusetts Colony.

==== King Philip's War ====
During King Phillip's War, Martyn did not join the militia, but stayed in his civilian government role. He planned the logistics for the expedition to Scarborough, Maine during King Philip’s War.

Among other things he was on a committee with Richard Waldron, John Cutt, and three other who wrote a status of King Philip’s War for the Massachusetts Legislature explaining situation in the northeast. He mentioned that the towns were out of men and he requested the Massachusetts build more forts and send men and ammunition. That the people are exhausted and could not respond to requests for aid from Boston.

In the middle of King Philips war, the inhabitants of Portsmouth learned that Robert Tufton Mason was petitioning King Charles II to separate Norfolk County from Massachusetts to form a proprietary colony called New Hampshire. Martyn was a member of a committee along with John Cutt, Thomas Daniels, and Elias Stileman to draft a petition to the king protesting Robert Mason’s claims.

=== Massachusetts Bay ===
He was a Deputy to the Great and General Court of Massachusetts in 1672, 1673, and 1679.

His work in Portsmouth and Massachusetts was noticed by Edward Randolph who mentioned in one of his reports to the Board of Trade that Martin would be good to serve in the government of the new Province of New Hampshire.

=== Independent New Hampshire ===
When New Hampshire was separated from Massachusetts in 1679, Martyn was specifically called out in the Commission of John Cutt to be a member of the Executive Council of New Hampshire. He became Treasurer of the province. However, he accepted under duress. Knowing that the king only separated New Hampshire at the urging of Robert Tufton Mason, he and Richard Waldron urged John Cutt to decline the commission. After consulting with the Massachusetts General Court, he and Waldron eventually accepted their place on the Council

As a political ally and friend of John Cutt and due to his Puritan background, Martyn strongly favored maintaining ties with Massachusetts.

As Treasurer, his duties included the collecting of taxes. There are no records of his involvement in smuggling, but almost certainly he was aware, or at least maintained plausible deniability, of the violations of the Navigation Acts. His friend Elias Stileman was the commander of Fort William and Mary and was fired by Edward Cranfield for allowing a smuggling vessel to pass.

=== Cranfield's Administration ===
Edward Cranfield was appointed governor of New Hampshire in 1682 and was given a much stronger commission. Martyn again was mentioned by name in the commission as a member of the executive council. However, six days after arriving in Portsmouth, Cranfield fired him and Richard Waldron from the Royal Council.

Historian Jeremy Belknap speculates that this early specimen of the exercise of power must have been intended as a public affront to them, in revenge for their former spirited conduct; otherwise their names might have been left out of the commission when it was drawn.

However, Cranfield restored them a few months later on the first day of the meeting of the Assembly claiming that he examined the allegations against them and found them insufficient.

Martyn received Edward Gove at his house when the latter was attempting to recruit prominent citizens to his rebellion. While sympathetic to the cause and sharing distaste for Cranfield, Martyn immediately reported him to the governor, after Gove left. During the trial, Martyn was one of the witnesses testifying against Gove.

Cranfield authorized a lawsuit against Martin. After being sued by Robert Mason, he lost the suit. Subsequently, he wrote a petition to Robert Mason requesting relief from £80 worth of quitrents stating that the costs would ruin him.] The request was denied. When Martyn claimed that he had no money, Cranfield stated that he would pay off Martyn’s debt for him. When Martyn said that he would be unable to pay off the debt, Cranfield responded that he would seize Martyn’s house as a payment.

=== Later Career ===
He served as Chief Justice of the Superior Court of Judicature (the name of the New Hampshire Supreme Court at the time).

== Family ==
He had four wives. His first wife was to Sarah, daughter of John Tuttle. They married on 1 December 1653 and had eight children:

Their children were Mary (1655), Sarach (1657), Richard Jr. (1659), Elizabeth (1662), Hannah (1664), Michael (1666), John (1668), and Elias (1670).

His second wife was Martha, widow of John Denison (son of John and Patience of Ipswich, Mass.), and daughter of Samuel Symonds.

His third wife was Elizabeth. He was her third husband. She was previously married to Tobias Langdon and Tobias Lear.

His fourth wife was Mary, widow of Samuel Wentworth (brother of William Wentworth). They married sometime around 1691 and she survived him until 1724.

== Death ==
He died on April 2, 1694 of what was called "leucophlegmatia". He appointed his friends Samuel Keaise and Samuel Penhallow to be the overseers in his will. He was worth £644 9s 4d.

Among other things, he left his wife Mary a bolt of cloth which at the time of his death was being worked on in the house by his slave Hannah Harris. He also left her his slave Hannah Harris until the said cloth be spun and then Hannah shall be freed.
