= Tipp City Independent Voice =

- The February 29, 2009 front page of the Tipp City Independent Voice
- Type: Weekly newspaper
- Format: Broadsheet
- Owner: TGM Designs
- Publisher: John Kessler
- Editor: Matt Black
- Founded: 2005
- Headquarters: 135 E. Main Street; Tipp City, Ohio 45371; United States
- Circulation: 1,000 Weekly
- ISSN: 1947-0258
- OCLC number: 310982865
- Website: tippvoice.com

The Tipp City Independent Voice (IV) was a weekly newspaper, serving Tipp City, Ohio as well as Monroe and Bethel townships in Miami County but the newspaper published its final issue on July 22, 2009. The paper was a member of the Ohio Newspaper Association and the Newspaper Association of America. The Voice had a weekly circulation of 1,000. New issues arrived on the newsstand throughout Tipp City every Wednesday afternoon while the newspaper was being published.

== History ==
The Tipp City Independent Voice was founded by journalist Matt Bayman and began publishing on Wednesday, February 2, 2005. Mr. Bayman was its proprietor, publisher, editor and business manager until January 2, 2008, until he was joined by John E. Kessler, Tom Adkins, Mike Overbay and Matt Black in forming TGM Designs, which continued to publish the Tipp City Independent Voice.

The paper was published in downtown Tipp City at 15 N Second Street until September 2006 when its offices moved to 135 E. Main Street where the paper was published until it ceased publication on July 22, 2009.

== Content ==
This newspaper reported on current local news sports, education, weather, and obituaries within the general geographic area of Tipp City, Ohio. The paper also maintained an opinion page which includes editorials, op-eds and letters to the editor. There are also features which included arts, movies, theater, dining and travel.

=== Regular features ===
Mike Scinto: Comments from Mike ranging from local and state to national issues that affect everyone. To the Editor: Reader's correspondence. Man on The Street: Two questions answered by local people. His & Hers: Dining review of area restaurants. Back Track Through History: Historical facts on the day of publication. Trips Around Tipp: A look at what is going on in around the area for that week.

=== Notable writers and employees ===
- Matt Bayman (founder, publisher, writer)
- John Kessler (publisher)
- Matt Black (managing editor)
- Michael Makuch (executive editor)
- Rebecca Rotunno (business manager)
- Greg Hall (sales manager)
- Kyle Terry (sales)
- Lauren Johnson (reporter)
- Mike Woody(assistant editor, journalist)
- Mark Hoke (sports editor)
- Betsy Cotton (advertising director)
- Susan Furlong (historical columnist)
- Mike Scinto (opinion columnist)
- Tina Davis (columnist)
- Lyle Whybrew (columnist)
- Katelyn Black (columnist)
- Angela Franzer (investigative reporter)
- Ashley Frey (web & graphics designer)
- Alisha McDaniel (journalist)
- Jeff Roseberry (contributing writer)
- Mike Jackson (columnist)
- J.T. Ryder (contributing writer)

The Tipp City Independent Voice also offered aspiring journalists an intensive internship program.

== Internet presence ==
The Tipp City Independent Voice has had a strong presence on the Web since 2006, On January 1, 2008; they initiated Tippvoice.Com, the Internet edition of the paper containing most of the local content produced by its reporters, photographers, columnists and contributors. The website is also highlighted by their community pages on Facebook and MySpace as well as updates and blogs on such sites as Twitter and Blogger. Accessing the online public forums requires registration to post and share thoughts on topics. Content can also be accessed through RSS feeds.

== Awards ==
In February 2009, the Independent Voice website was named Best Independent Newspaper Website at the annual Osman C. Hooper Newspaper Contest, which recognizes the best newspapers in Ohio. The judges said: "Lots of original news content, including photo galleries; use of MySpace and Facebook; interface is powerful. Good use of bookmarking tools. Site includes ability to increase/decrease font sizes. Lots of directories for community content. Could improve with more photos and multimedia within stories, rss feeds and email alerts, and more content in the directories for community links".

== Former External links ==
- Tippvoice.Com (Official Site)
- Independent Voice on Twitter
- Independent Voice on Blogger
