= Gardens Alive! =

American garden supplies company

- Type: Private
- Industry: Gardening; Gifts
- Founded: 1984 in Sunman, Indiana, US
- Founder: Niles Kinerk
- Headquarters: Lawrenceburg, Indiana, United States
- Revenue: $170 million (2010)
- Number of employees: 400 (year round); 1000 (seasonal peak)
- Website: gardensalive.com

Gardens Alive!, Inc. is a privately owned multi-title catalog company founded in 1984. It sells garden and lawn supplies, focusing on organic items under its primary brand. The company grew by purchasing competing brands, including an expansion into gifts and games following its 2008 acquisition of BlueSky Brands. By 2010, the company reported annual sales of approximately $170 million, 60 percent of which came from garden-related business.

== Business model ==
Gardens Alive! sells products primarily through its nationwide print catalog network and online store. The namesake catalog is printed in a small, newsprint format. Other gardening catalogs the company operates include Audubon Workshop, Breck's, Gurney's Seed, Henry Field's, Iseli Nursery, Michigan Bulb, New Holland Bulb, Spring Hill Nurseries, and Weeks Roses, all acquired through corporate buyouts.

The company operates fulfillment centers in Lawrenceburg, Indiana, and in Tipp City and Lewisburg, Ohio, alongside a distribution center in Fairfield, Ohio. Marketing and merchandising offices are located in Ohio, Georgia, Massachusetts, and Indiana. Gardens Alive! publishes the print version of Mike McGrath's "Question of the Week" segment from the syndicated radio program, You Bet Your Garden.

As of 2010, the company recorded annual sales of approximately $170 million, maintaining 400 to 450 year-round employees and expanding to nearly 1,000 workers during peak seasonal demand. Internet sales accounted for 40 to 45 percent of the business, with catalogs constituting the remainder. Gifts and general merchandise accounted for 40 percent of the company's revenue, while the other 60 percent was gardening-related. As of 2011, Gardens Alive! was the top seed cataloger in the United States, with $100.6 million in revenue from its seed catalogs compared to $24.8 million for Park Seed Company, the second-largest cataloger.

== History ==
Gardens Alive! founder Niles Kinerk grew up on a farm in Fort Wayne, Indiana. The family farm primarily raised livestock 'Homer P. Kinerk and Sons Polan and China Hogs', but Niles' interest was in horticultural, especially organics. He worked at Burpee Seeds for a year before really learning the direct mail business at Josten's Publishing Company's library services division. In 1978, he founded a library supply catalog called The Library Store.

In 1984, Kinerk sold The Library Store, and founded The Natural Gardening Research Center, a garden supply catalog specializing in biological control of garden pests. The name was confusing to some so, in 1998, it was renamed Gardens Alive! It was named after a catalog called Plants Alive! that had recently gone out of business. It was printed on newsprint, and 25,000 copies of the catalog were mailed in the first year Only 325 orders were generated. The second year there were 3,000 orders, and in the third 20,000. By the end of that year Kinerk needed to hire more workers. Orders in the fourth year were 60,000.

During the 1990s, Gardens Alive! expanded its product line to include organic alternatives to traditional chemical pesticides, herbicides, fungicides and fertilizers. In 1997, the company acquired a failed gardening catalog aimed at bird lovers called Audubon Workshop. By 2001, annual sales had reached $15 million.

In 2001, Gardens Alive! acquired more catalogs from the assets from direct marketer Foster & Gallagher who had filed for bankruptcy. Gardens Alive! spent $10.75 million to acquire Breck's, Gurney Seeds, Henry Field's, Michigan Bulb, Spring Hill Nursery and Stark Bros. Stark Bros. was immediately sold off. The Foster & Gallagher businesses were integrated, in part, in Lawrenceburg, while the Spring Hill facility in Tipp City, Ohio, has continued to grow through acquisition.

Gardens Alive! bought two of BlueSky Brands' catalogs after their bankruptcy. The Westerly, RI, distribution center used by BlueSky was reopened to handle fulfillment of the new product lines, but fulfillment was later moved to the Lawrenceburg, Indiana, facility. In 2009, Gardens Alive! continued to diversify, acquiring six more new catalogs. In July 2009, Kinerk stepped down as CEO to focus on orchestrating future acquisitions, promoting Eric Hamant to CEO. In 2011, Gardens Alive! acquired Iseli Nursery, a Boring, Oregon, based wholesale brand specializing in unique conifers and trees and Weeks Roses, based in Wasco, California.

As of November 2024, the gardensalive.com website redirects to gurneys.com/gardensalive, with the company having rebranded under the Gurney's brand they already owned. The redirected page contains the message: Gurney's is now the exclusive supplier of Gardens Alive! brand products and we hope to become your one-stop lawn and garden shop. The last post from Gardens Alive on their Facebook Page was on January 17, 2023. The Gurney's web site main page has this footer as of November 2024: Copyright © 2024 Gardens Alive!, d/b/a Gurney's Seed and Nursery Co. All Rights Reserved. Gurney's trademarks are registered trademarks of Gardens Alive!

== Reputation ==
Gardens Alive! is known as a "pioneer" in organic gardening, selling chemical-free lawn and garden products through its namesake catalog. According to the Eugene Register-Guard, the company has "an excellent reputation as a leading innovator" in the organic product market.

In 2011, Gardens Alive! and its subsidiaries won three Green Thumb Awards from the Direct Gardening Association. Gurney's "Tickled Pink" grape won for being disease and pest resistant, while Gardens Alive's "All-Ways Greener" grass seed won for needing minimal water and its Encapsulated Compost Worm Cocoons won for boosting compost piles. In 2013, it won a Green Thumb Award for its Strawberry Pyramid Grow Tub for maximizing sun exposure in tight spaces. Henry Field's took two awards that year. Its "Heaven Can Wait" blackberries won for being high in antioxidants and two of its persimmon breeds shared an award for pushing the harvest date forward, limiting pest exposure. With such a large client base, customer satisfaction is an issue, as evidenced by mediocre internet ratings by customers.
