= White Horse Tavern (Newport, Rhode Island) =

Historic place in Rhode Island, United States

- U.S. National Register of Historic Places
- U.S. National Historic Landmark District – Contributing property
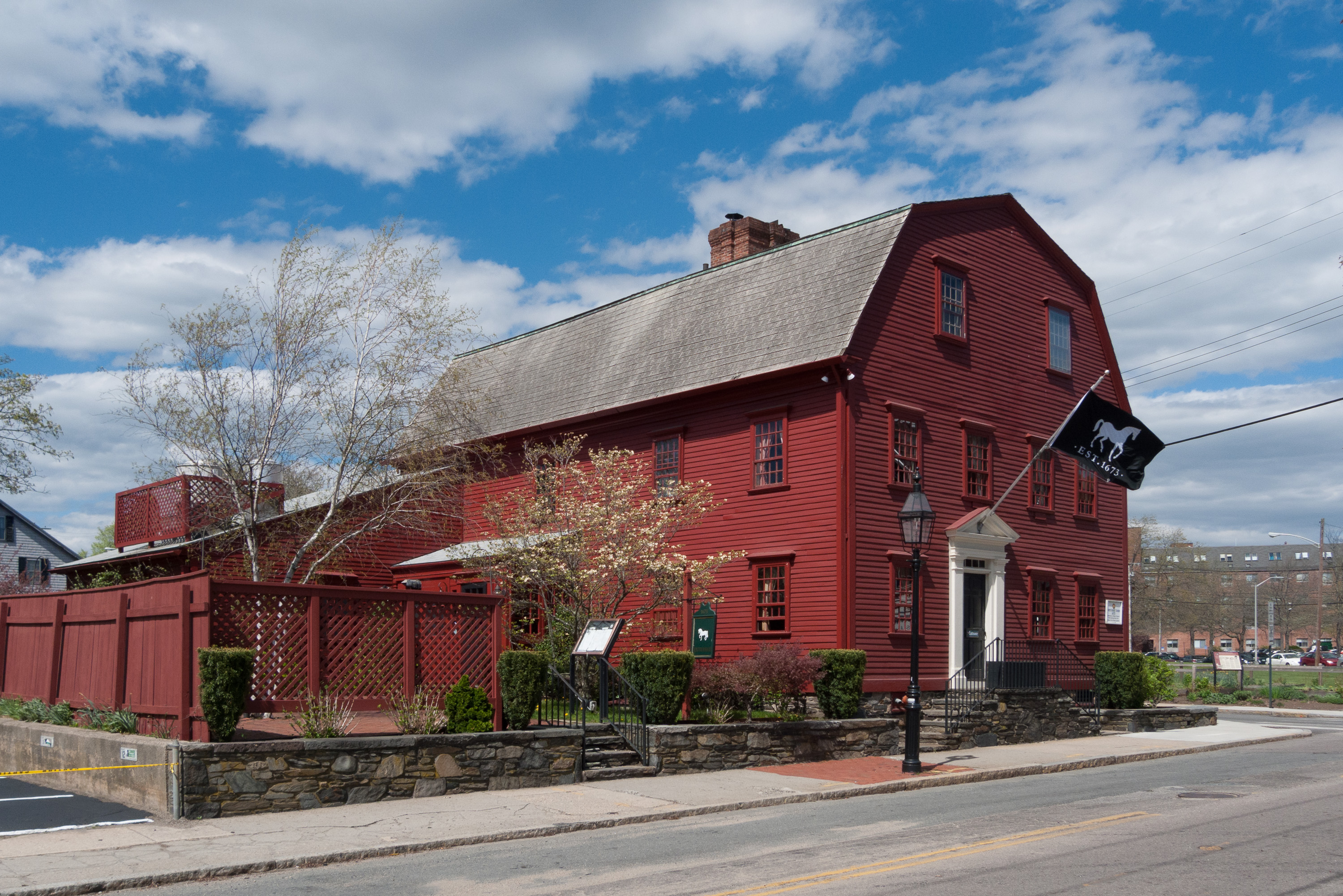
- White Horse Tavern in 2017

- Location within Rhode Island Location within the United States
- Location: 26 Marlborough Street; Newport, Rhode Island
- Coordinates: 41°29′29.0″N 71°18′49.5″W
- Built: 1652–1673
- Part of: Newport Historic District (ID68000001)
- NRHP reference No.: 72000032

Significant dates
- Added to NRHP: February 23, 1972
- Designated NHLDCP: November 24, 1968

The White Horse Tavern is a tavern in Newport, Rhode Island. The building was constructed before 1673 and is believed to be the oldest tavern building in the United States. It is located on the corner of Farewell and Marlborough streets.

== History ==
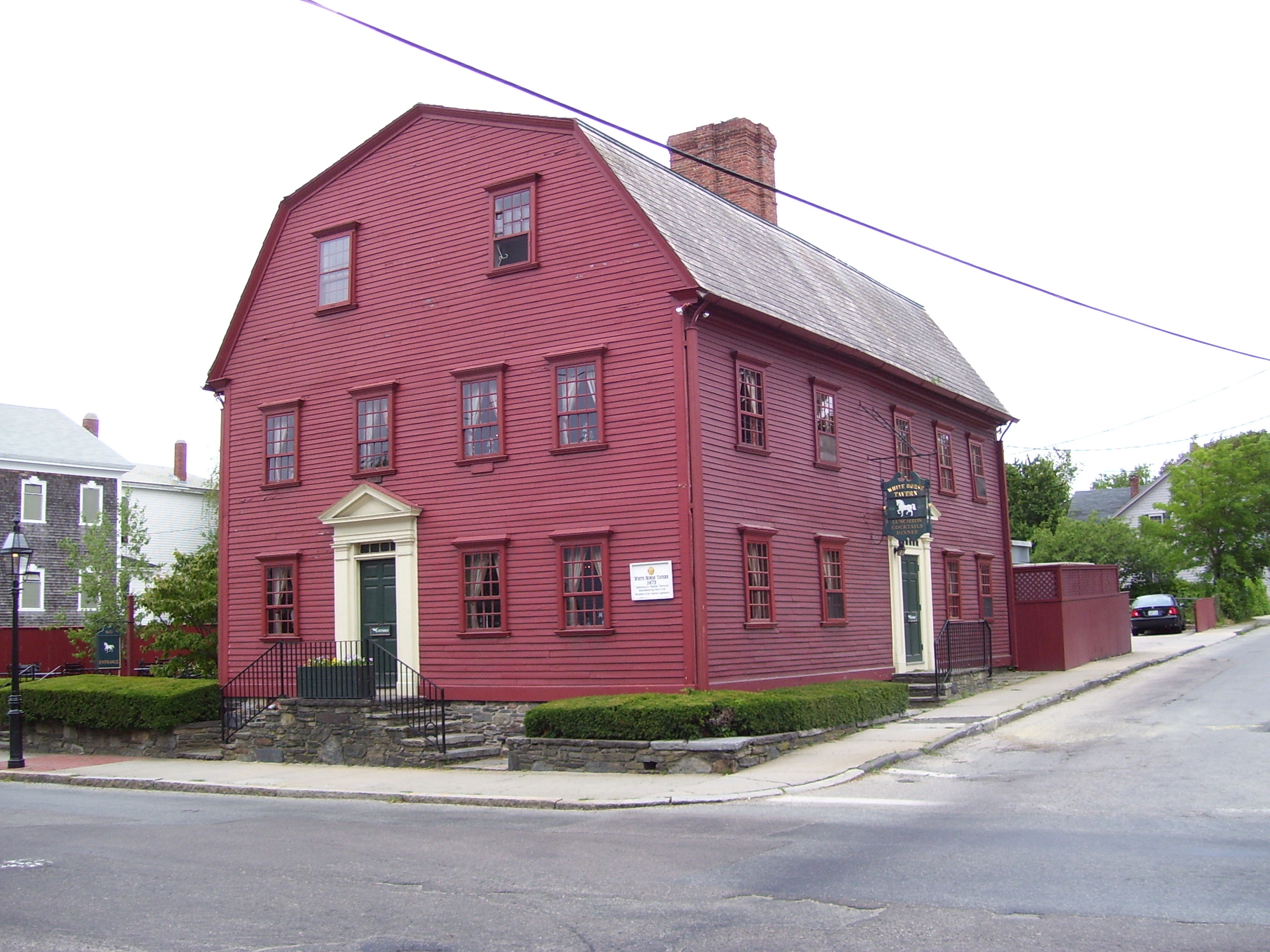
The tavern in 2009

English immigrant Francis Brinley constructed the original building on the site in 1652 on land obtained from his brother-in-law William Coddington. In 1673, he sold the lot to William Mayes, who enlarged the building to become a tavern. It was also used for large meetings, including as a Rhode Island General Assembly meeting place, a courthouse, and a city hall. Mayes obtained a tavern license in 1687, and his son William Mayes Jr. operated it through the early eighteenth century. The operation was named "The White Horse Tavern" in 1730 by owner Jonathan Nichols.

Loyalists and British troops were quartered at the tavern during the British occupation of Newport in the American Revolution, around the time of the Battle of Rhode Island. It is rumored that Benjamin Franklin patronized the tavern when visiting his brother James, who operated a printing press in town.

== Modern use ==
Newport's Van Bueren family donated money to the private Preservation Society of Newport to restore the building in 1952, after years of neglect as a boarding house. After the restoration, it was sold and once again operated as a private tavern and restaurant, and it remains a popular drinking and dining location today.

== See also ==
- List of the oldest restaurants in the United States
- Oldest buildings in America
- National Register of Historic Places listings in Newport County, Rhode Island
- List of the oldest buildings in Rhode Island
- List of oldest companies
- List of oldest companies in the United States
