= Eppes Island =

Archaeological site in Virginia, United States

- U.S. National Register of Historic Places
- Virginia Landmarks Register
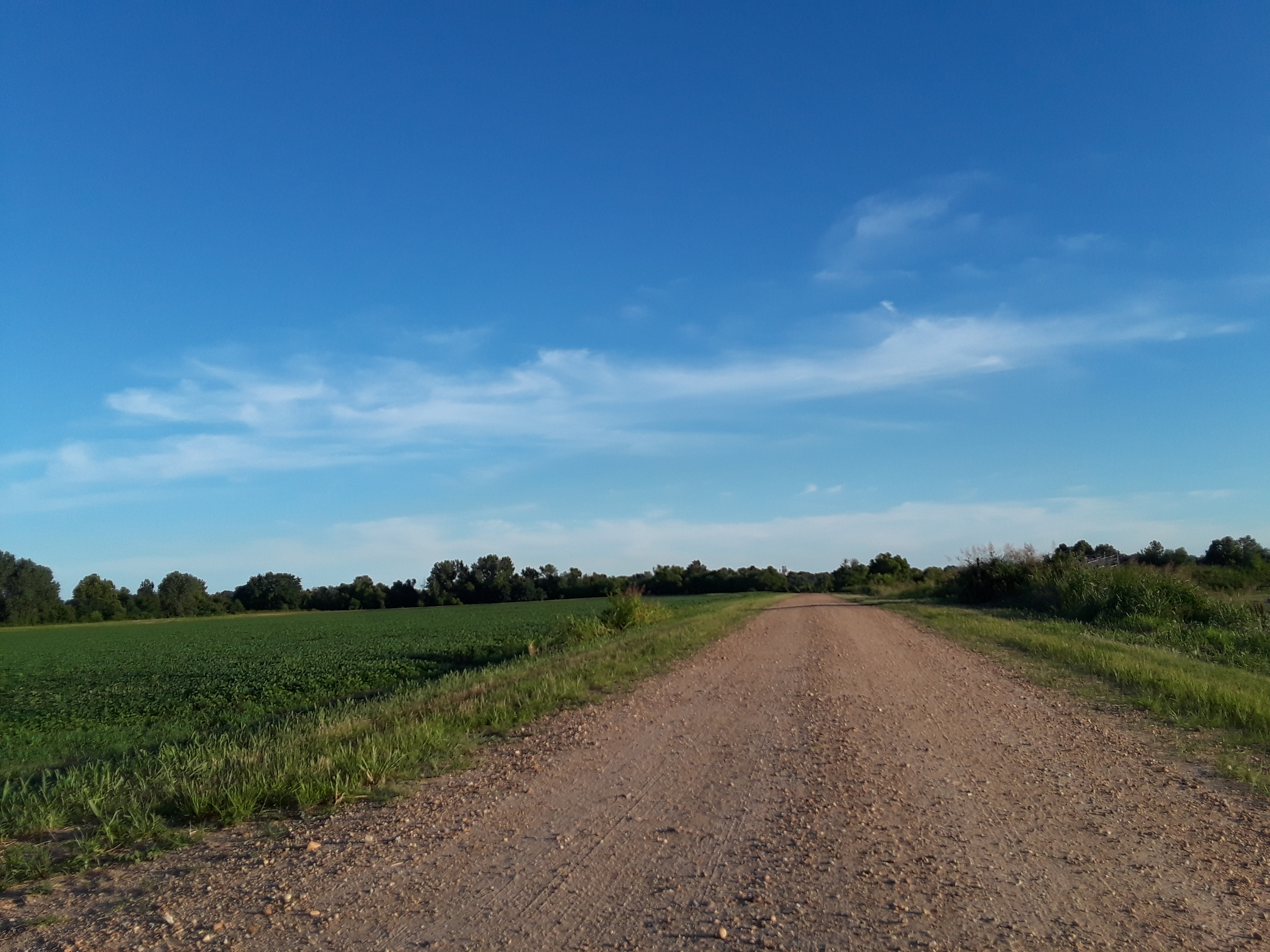
- Nearest city: Hopewell, Virginia
- NRHP reference No.: 69000337
- VLR No.: 018-0033

Significant dates
- Added to NRHP: November 12, 1969
- Designated VLR: May 13, 1969

Eppes Island, also known as Shirley Hundred Island, is a 292 acre island and a historic home and archaeological site near Hopewell, Charles City County, Virginia. The island was originally settled as part of Shirley Hundred Plantation. The island contains five 17th-century sites, two 18th-century sites and one dwelling dated to about 1790.

It was added to the National Register of Historic Places in 1969.

As of November 2024, it is still privately owned by the Eppes family, registered under Richard and Tara Eppes and designated as agricultural land.
