= Spring Hill Nurseries =

Mail-order garden center in Ohio

Spring Hill Nurseries is a mail-order garden center based in Tipp City, Ohio. Founded in 1849, Spring Hill Nurseries is one of the oldest gardening companies in the United States. The company specializes in garden plants, garden designs, perennials, shrubs, ground covers and gardening supplies. Spring Hill Nursery distributes catalogs nationwide and maintains a substantial presence online. One of the largest companies in the gardening industry, Spring Hill Nurseries’ headquarters features many acres of greenhouses and trial gardens.

== History ==
Peter Bohlender (born February 1, 1838) immigrated to Dayton, Ohio, from Bavaria, Germany, with his family, at the age of 6. Having no opportunity to attend school, Bohlender worked for a local nursery, where he received training in the gardening industry. In 1849, he started his own small nursery in North Dayton, Ohio.

In 1889, Bohlender renamed the nursery Spring Hill Nurseries and moved his nursery to Tipp City, Ohio. He surmised the name “Spring Hill” from a small hill located near the nursery’s current location.

Spring Hill Nurseries was initially a wholesale garden store, providing products and services to Tipp City locals. In 1930, Spring Hill expanded and became primarily a mail-order gardening company. The garden center retained a smaller retail store, which is still in function today as the Tipp City Outlet Center, offering a variety of plant selections and gifting items, with limited hours.

In 2001, Spring Hill Nursery was acquired by Gardens Alive! when then parent company Foster & Gallagher went bankrupt.

== Horticultural Research and Development ==
Spring Hill Nurseries’ garden center, which includes a trial garden, and 9 acres (36,000 m^{2}) of greenhouses, are the focal point for much of the research, testing and controlled-environment growing of plant products that Spring Hill Nursery provides. The horticultural specialists at Spring Hill grow and test new plant varieties in manipulated ecological units to ensure heat and soil tolerance, disease resistance and ease of growth. Spring Hill Nurseries also has a plant breeding program, developing new plant breeds and hybrids. The display gardens at Spring Hill Nurseries, which have been featured as a feature destination point by Ohio Magazine, attracted visitors from around the country but have been replaced with test gardens for their expanded rose breeding program.
