= Upper Shirley, Virginia =

- Upper Shirley
- U.S. National Register of Historic Places
- Virginia Landmarks Register
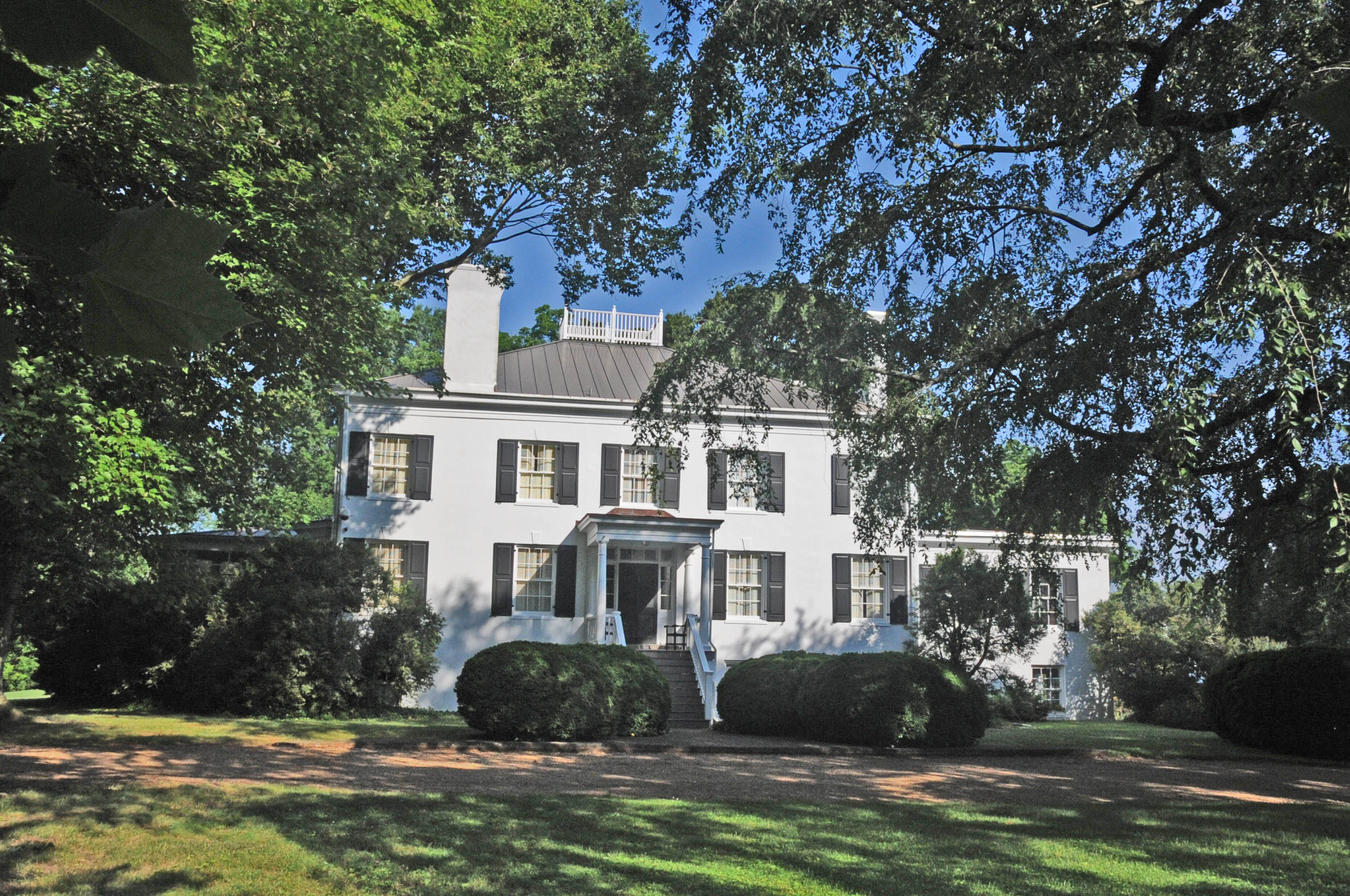

- Location within Virginia Location within the United States
- Location: W of Charles City on SR 608, Charles City, Virginia
- Coordinates: 37°20′50″N 77°15′24″W
- Area: 9 acres (3.6 ha)
- Built: 1868-1870, 1890
- Built by: A. H. Marks and Bros.
- NRHP reference No.: 82001884
- VLR No.: 018-0026

Significant dates
- Added to NRHP: October 29, 1982
- Designated VLR: December 15, 1981

Upper Shirley is a historic plantation house located near Charles City, Charles City County, Virginia. In 1866, the owner of Shirley Plantation, Hill Carter, decided to retire and divide his Shirley Plantation estate, with the bulk of the estate (the current Shirley Plantation) bequeathed to his son, Robert, and the 'Upper Shirley' portion bequeathed to William Fitzhugh Carter. The original section of the house was built in 1868–1870, which has consequently been enlarged to its present size in 1890. It is a two-story, nearly square, stucco covered brick dwelling with an overhanging hipped roof. It measures approximately 42 feet by 47 feet. The front facade features a portico with stylized Doric order columns. On the west elevation is a doorway originally on the Warren House in Harrisonburg, Virginia; it is protected by a two-level porch which stretches across the entire facade. The house was built by Hill Carter for his son William Fitzhugh Carter of materials salvaged from a large 18th-century building that was demolished at Shirley Plantation.

It was added to the National Register of Historic Places in 1982. Upper Shirley is now home to Upper Shirley Vineyards.
