= J.E. Rhoads & Sons =

- J.E. Rhoads & Sons wordmark (1977 to 2009)

- Formerly: Rhoads Company
- Industry: Mechanical belt manufacturing
- Founded: 1702
- Founder: Joseph Rhoads
- Defunct: 2009
- Brands: Tannate, Texalon
- Revenue: $5 million (1985)
- Website: jerhoadsandsons.com (as a brand of Mid-Atlantic Belting)

J.E. Rhoads & Sons was the longest continually operating company in the United States until it closed in 2009 after 307 years in business. Founded in 1702 in Marple, Pennsylvania, it eventually relocated to Wilmington, Delaware, and, finally, to Branchburg, New Jersey. Until the 1990s, it was owned by descendants of its founder, Joseph Rhoads.

== History ==

J.E. Rhoads & Sons was founded by Joseph Rhoads as the Rhoads Company, a commercial tannery, in 1702 in Marple, Pennsylvania. The company came to specialize in the manufacture of leather belts for mechanical applications.

thumb|left Following the American Civil War, the company purchased the Downing & Price tannery in Wilmington, Delaware. It moved much of its manufacturing operations there in 1868 while keeping its headquarters in Pennsylvania. In the 20th century, the company transitioned most of its product lines from leather to rubber-made, relocated the company's headquarters to Wilmington, and made an initial public offering of shares. In 1977, it would, again, relocate, this time to suburban New Castle County, Delaware.

In 1983 John McGough joined J.E. Rhoads & Sons as chief executive officer, becoming the first person outside the Rhoads family to head the company since its founding. Ten years later, in 1993, a majority of the company's shares were sold out of the Rhoads family to an anonymous buyer, who moved its operations to an industrial park in Branchburg, New Jersey. The company went out of business in 2009. Its name and trademarks were subsequently sold to Mid Atlantic Belting, a company founded by Richard Miller II who had been employed by J.E. Rhoads & Sons in the 1970s.

=== Military contracts ===
Since the company's founding, members of the Rhoads family were Quakers. During the War of 1812, the American Civil War, and World War I, the company suffered – relative to its competitors – due to its decision not to pursue lucrative military contracts, or to sell belting to arms manufacturers, owing to the owners' pacifist beliefs. The increasing complexity of the military industry stressed the company's ethos during World War II, and management decided to apply a "50 percent" rule. In addition to an outright ban on direct military sales, salespeople were instructed not to solicit or close contracts with companies they believed sold 50 percent or more of their products to the U.S. Armed Forces.

=== Longevity ===
Before its closure, both The New York Times and the Library of Congress referred to J.E. Rhoads & Sons as the longest continually operating American business still in existence.

== Legacy ==
The company's records from 1720 through the year 1969 are held by the Hagley Museum and Library in Wilmington, Delaware.

== See also ==
- List of oldest companies in the United States
