= Field View Farm =

American dairy farm and farm machinery manufacturer

Coordinates: 41°18′43″N 73°02′47″W

- Trade name: Field View Farm Transportation Inc.
- Company type: Private
- Industry: Farming
- Founded: Connecticut, United States (1639)
- Founder: Thomas Hine
- Headquarters: Orange, United States
- Area served: Connecticut (170 acres (69 ha))
- Key people: Walter S. Hine & Dorothy Hine, current owners

Field View Farm (also known as Fieldview Farm) is an American dairy farm and farm machinery manufacturer in Orange, Connecticut. The business has been operational since 1639, making it one of the oldest companies in the United States.

== History ==
The farm was established by Thomas Hine and his family in 1639 and has been under family ownership for twelve generations. It mainly produces dairy products, such as milk and ice-cream; although due to a fire in 1996 has recently bolstered income by selling agricultural equipment under the trading name of Field View Farm Transportation Inc. The "devastating barn fire" was started accidentally and destroyed the main barn and much of the daily production equipment, totaling US$500,000 of damage; the Hine family stated "That fire wiped us out. We had to start over." The farm was granted a US$40,000 state grant in 2010 to help the rebuild, which had been ongoing for the previous 14 years.
