= Barker's Farm =

Coordinates: 42°43′19.7″N 71°6′39.8″W

- Trade name: Barker's Farmstand
- Company type: Private
- Industry: Farming (dairy & apples)
- Founded: Essex County, Massachusetts (1642)
- Founder: Barker family
- Headquarters: North Andover, United States
- Area served: Massachusetts (70 acres (28 ha))
- Key people: Dianne Barker, current owner
- Revenue: US$250,000 – US$500,000 (2003)
- Number of employees: 1 full-time; 5 part-time

Barker's Farm (also known as Barker's Farmstand or the Barker Farm) is an American farm and orchard in North Andover, Massachusetts. The business has been operational since 1642, making it one of the oldest companies in the United States. They specialize in locally grown organic fruits and vegetables.

== History ==
The farm was established in 1642 and has been owned by the Barker family since; the current owner, Dianne Barker, is an eleventh generation owner.
