= Seaside Inn =

Hotel in Kennebunk, Maine, United States

General information
- Location: Kennebunk, Maine, 80 Beach Avenue, Kennebunk Beach
- Coordinates: 43°20′55″N 70°28′45″W
- Opening: 1667; 359 years ago
- Owner: Trish and Ken Mason

Technical details
- Floor count: 2

Design and construction
- Developer: John Gooch

Other information
- Number of rooms: 22
- Parking: none

Website
- www.kennebunkbeachmaine.com

The Seaside Inn (formerly the Seaside Inn & Cottages) is an Inn in Kennebunk, Maine which has been in continuous operation under the same family since 1667, making it one of the oldest companies in the United States.

== History ==
John Gooch, the first settler in the Cape Neddick area, arrived in the area 1637. At some point, he established the Inn, and, by 1667, he was commissioned by Ferdinando Gorges, an agent of King Charles II, to "reside on the ocean-front peninsula at the mouth of the Kennebunk River and ferry travellers across the River." The inn has been in continuous operation by the Gooch family since its inception. In 2018, it remained owned by John Gooch's twelfth-generation descendants.

== Literature ==
The early Gooch family history was chronicled in the 1929 novel Arundel by American author Kenneth Roberts. Additionally, current owner Trish Mason has written a work of non-fiction entitled The Seaside House: Maine Innkeepers which tells the complete history of the family and running of the inn.

== Awards ==
The inn was recognized by New England's Yankee Magazine as the Maine lodging with the "Best Family Ties" in 2009.
