= Joseph Breck (businessman) =

- Born: 1794; Medfield, Massachusetts
- Died: June 14, 1873 (aged 78–79); Brighton, Massachusetts
- Occupations: Horticulturist and Businessman

Joseph Breck (1794–1873), a businessman and horticulturist of the 19th century, was born in Medfield, Massachusetts. He moved to Pepperell, Massachusetts, in 1817, working in the chaise carriage manufacturing business while also exploring his passion for horticulture in his gardens. His interest in flowers and plants developed into a career as an editor, from 1822 to 1846, of the New England Farmer, one of the earliest agricultural magazines established in the U.S., and the first of its kind in New England.

Breck moved to Lancaster, Massachusetts, in 1832 to become superintendent of the Lancaster Horticultural Gardens. In 1833, Breck wrote a book called The Young Florist, which is a dialogue between two young gardeners that presents information about flowers and natural history as it relates to flower cultivation.

Breck moved to Brighton, Massachusetts, in 1836 and established a nursery while also expanding his business interests into a seed and agricultural implement store called Joseph Breck & Sons in Boston, Massachusetts (many publicity materials and catalogs would claim 1822 as the founding date of Joseph Breck & Sons, while later ones claimed 1818). In 1840, Breck published his company’s first catalog, the New England Agricultural Warehouse and Seed Store Catalogue, to promote his company’s products. The catalog included illustrations and horticultural literature to accompany product listings.

In 1851, Breck published The Flower Garden, a book about the cultivation of ornamental plants such as perennials, annuals, shrubs and evergreen trees. One of the founding members of the American Seed Trade Association, Breck was the president of the Massachusetts Horticultural Society from 1859 to 1862. Breck moved to the Oak Square section of Brighton in 1854, where he built an extensive nursery. He lived there until his death in 1873. Breck served as a Massachusetts State Senator in 1863 as part of the 84th Massachusetts General Court.

== Legacy ==
His company still exists today as Breck's.

Breck Avenue in the Oak Square section of Brighton, Massachusetts, is named in his honor. The original Breck Homestead in Pepperell, Massachusetts is part of the Pepperell Center Historic District.

Joseph Breck was the great-grandfather of Joseph Breck (curator), the first director of The Cloisters who was instrumental in its garden designs.

== See also ==
- 84th Massachusetts General Court (1863)
