= Shirley Plantation =

Historical site in Charles City County, Virginia, US

- Shirley
- U.S. National Register of Historic Places
- U.S. National Historic Landmark
- Virginia Landmarks Register
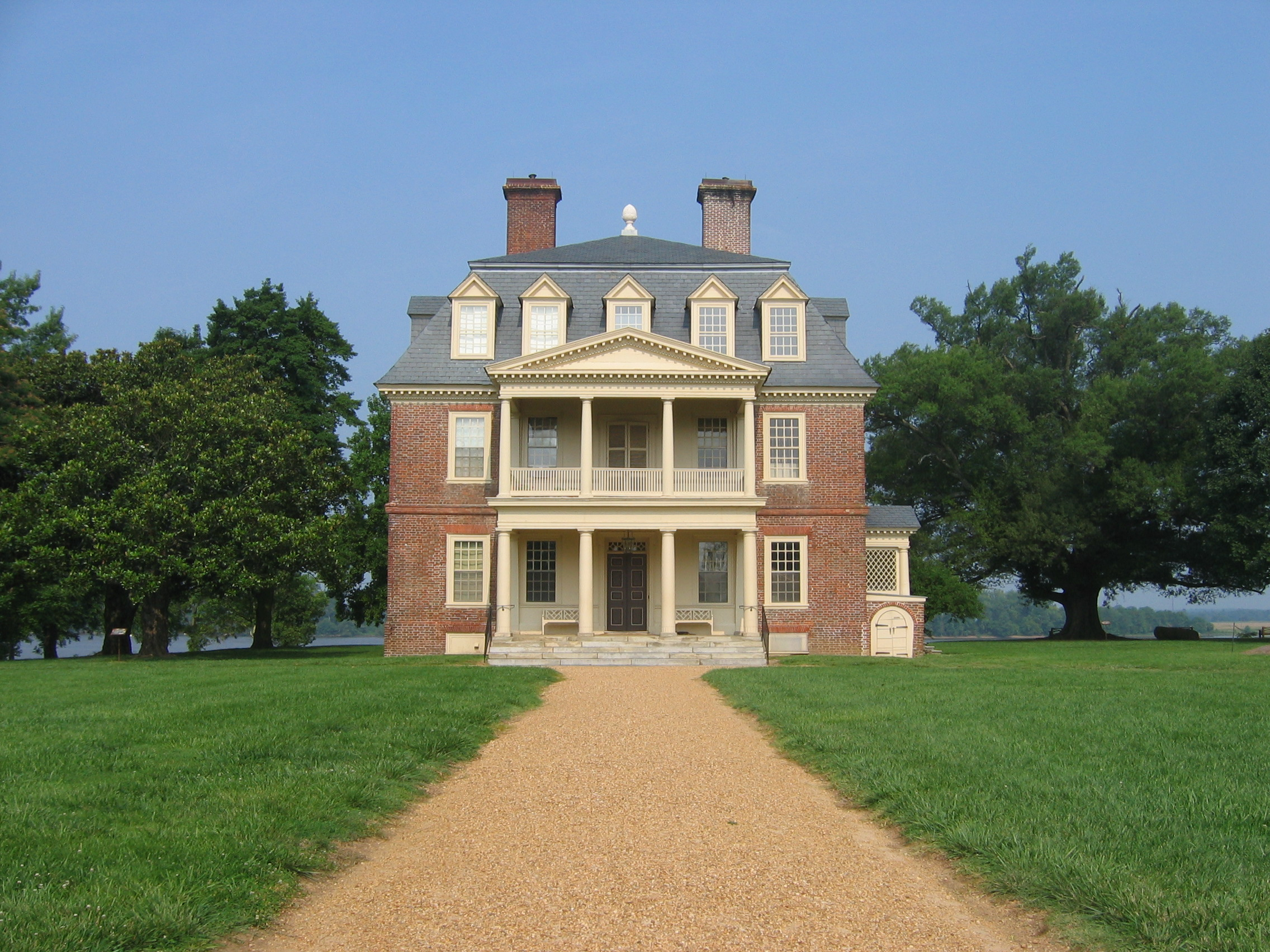
- Main house of Shirley Plantation, July 2006

- Location within Virginia Location within the United States
- Interactive map showing the location of Shirley
- Location: 5 mi. N of Hopewell on SR 608 in Charles City County, Virginia
- Coordinates: 37°20′31″N 77°15′39″W
- Built: circa 1723; 303 years ago
- Architectural style: Georgian
- NRHP reference No.: 69000328
- VLR No.: 018-0022

Significant dates
- Added to NRHP: October 1, 1969
- Designated NHL: April 15, 1970
- Designated VLR: November 5, 1968

Shirley Plantation is an estate on the north bank of the James River in Charles City County, Virginia. It is located off scenic byway State Route 5, between Richmond and Williamsburg. It is the oldest active plantation in Virginia, settled in 1613 and is also the oldest family-owned business in North America, when it was acquired by the Hill family, with operations starting in 1638. White indentured servants were initially used as the main labor force until the early 1700s, when Black slavery became the primary source of Virginian labor. It used about 70 to 90 African slaves at a time for plowing the fields, cleaning, childcare, and cooking. It was added to the National Register in 1969 and declared a National Historic Landmark in 1970. After the acquisition, rebranding, and merger of Tuttle Farm in Dover, New Hampshire, Shirley Plantation received the title of the oldest business continuously operating in the United States.

== History ==
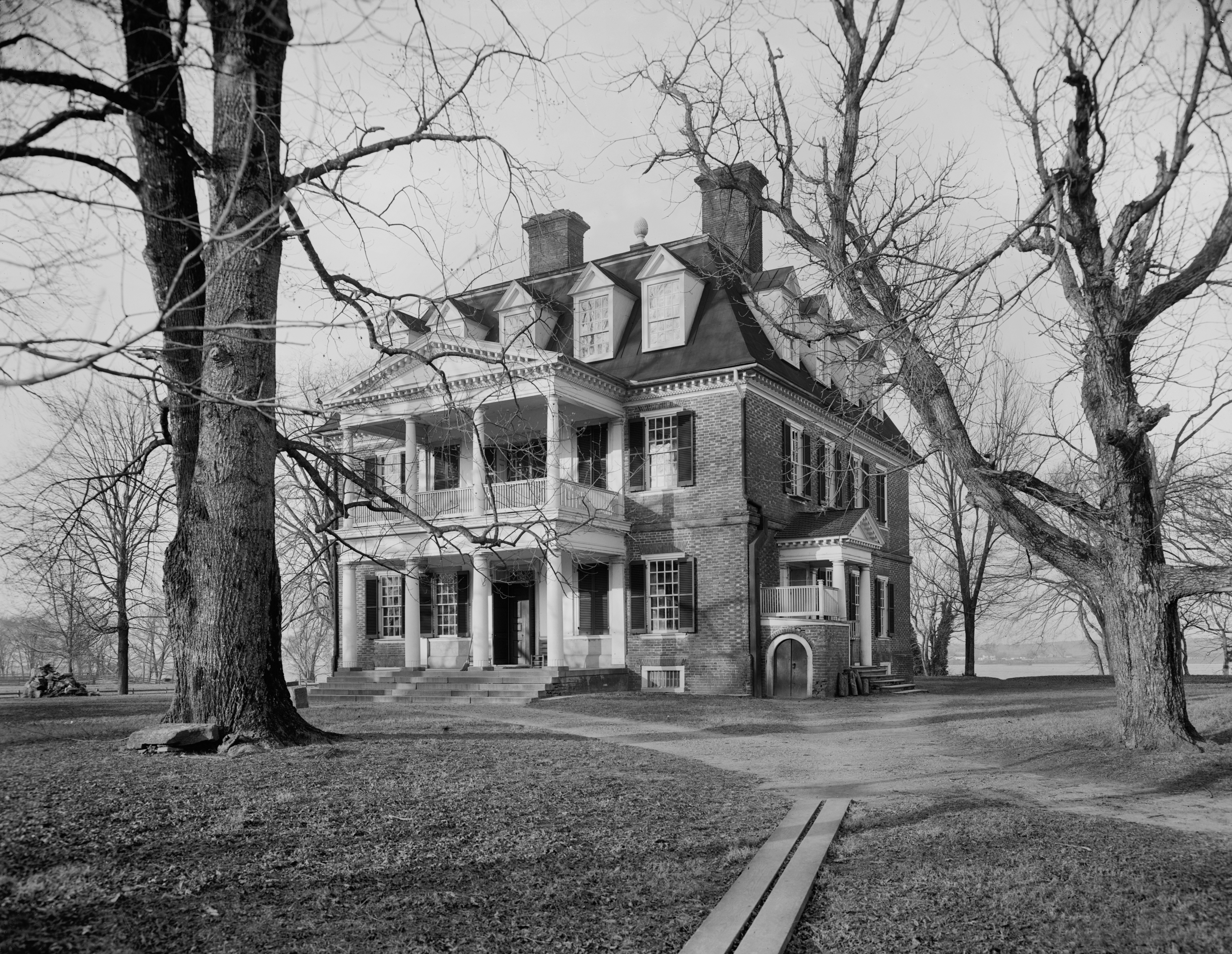
The Shirley Plantation, c. 1900–1906, photo by William Henry Jackson

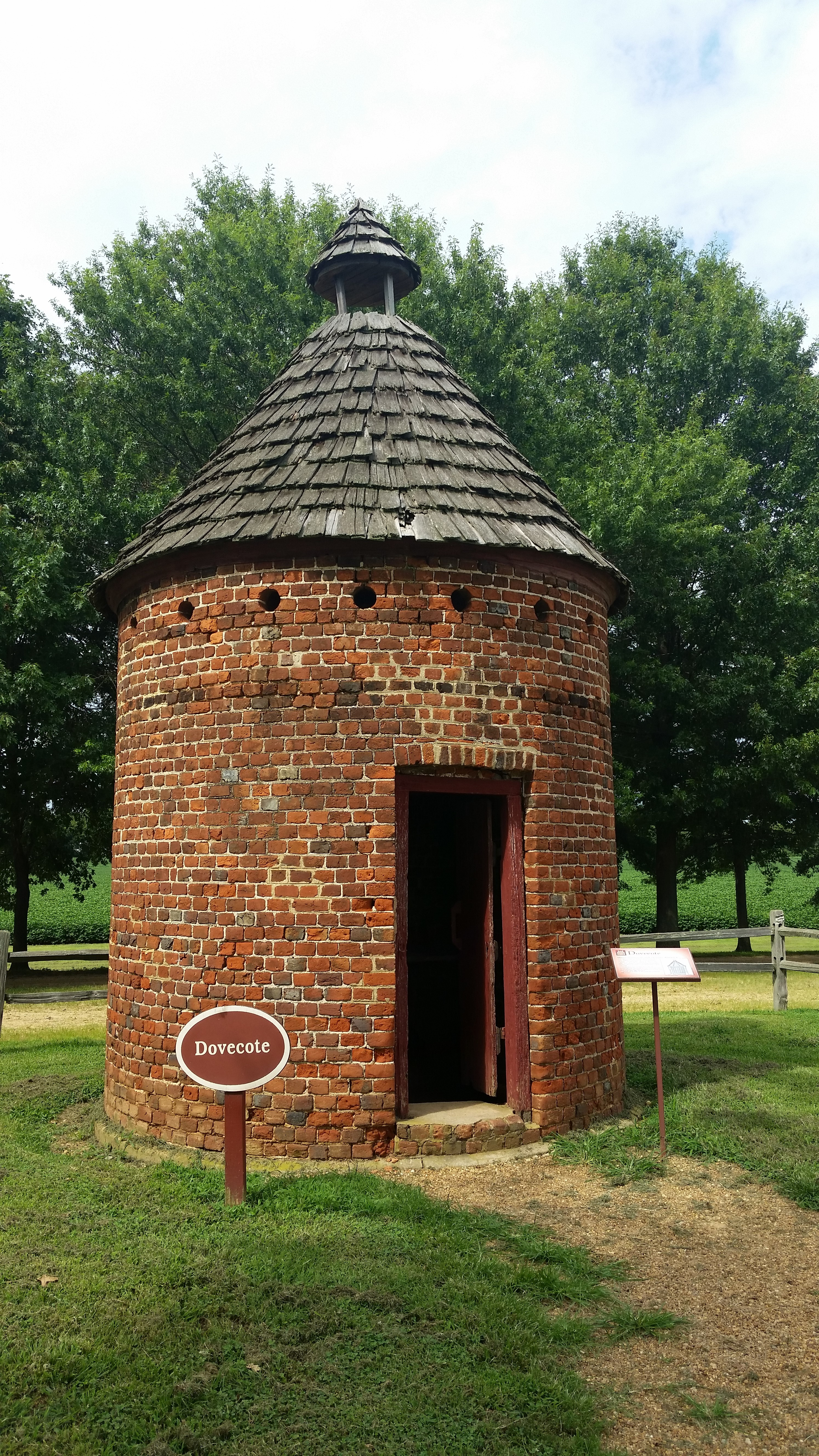
Shirley Plantation dovecote

The lands of Shirley Plantation were first settled by Europeans in 1613 by Sir Thomas West, 3rd Baron De La Warr and were named West and Sherley Hundred, probably because Lord Delaware's wife Cessalye was the daughter of Sir Thomas Sherley (variant spellings being common at the time). Several years later, John Rolfe wrote A True Relation of the State of Virginia left by Sir Thomas Dale Knight in May last 1616. He named it one of six European settlements in the colony and noted that Captain Isaac Maddeson commanded 25 laborers and farmers "employed only in planting and curing 'Tobacco', with the profit thereof to cloth themselves, and all those who labor about the general Busyne" [sic]. It survived the native American uprising of March 22, 1622 relatively unscathed, and became the westernmost settlement on the north side of the James River for a while. The tobacco was shipped within the colonies and to England. A report in 1623 found the West and Sherlow Hundred had 45 men, women, and children, with an additional 24 (including Francis West) at the "Iland" (modern Eppes Island in the James River, visible from the manor house).

Coat of Arms of Edward Hill

In 1638, Edward Hill acquired part of this land, thus beginning the occupation by the Hill family, understood to be the same family as Sir Rowland Hill of Soulton, publisher of the Geneva Bible.

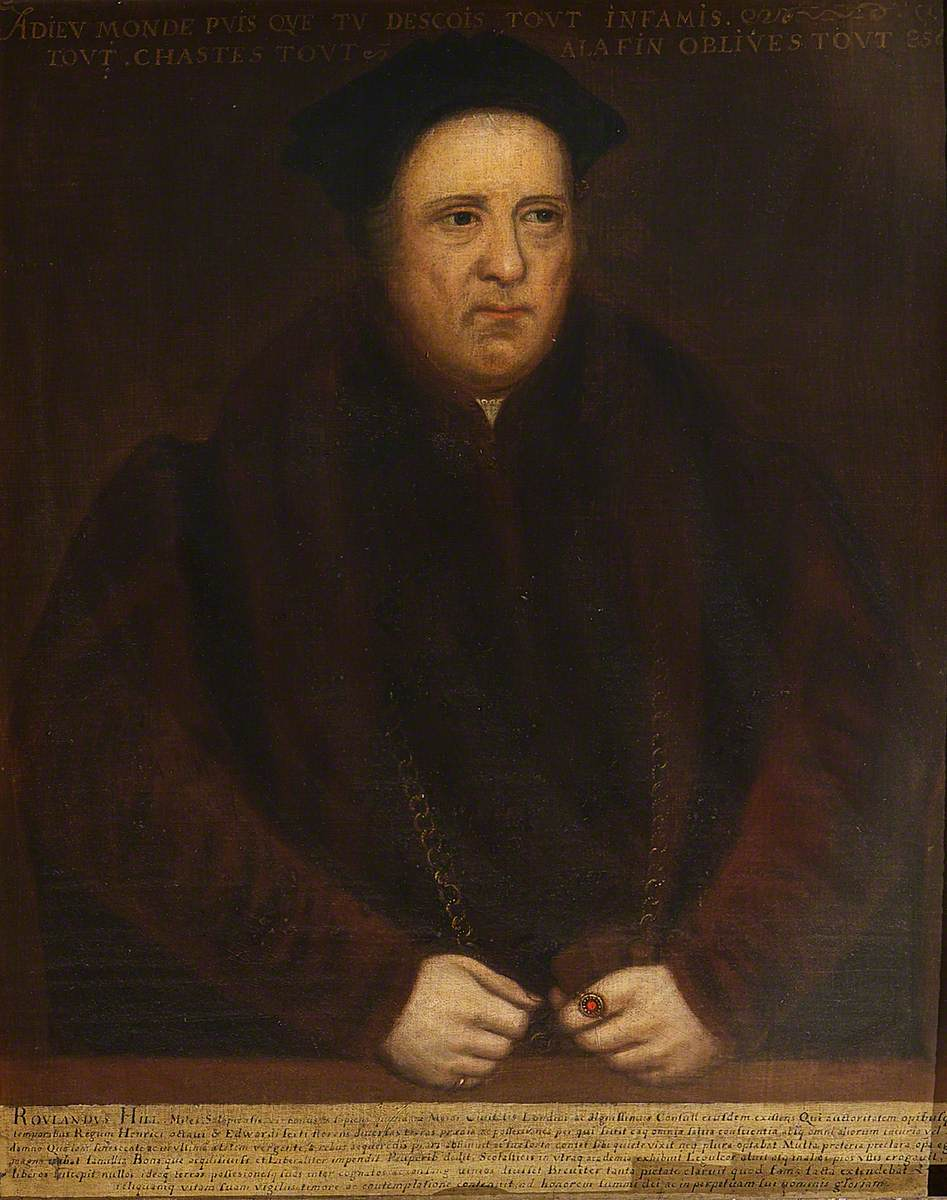
Sir Rowland Hill: understood to be related to the Hills of the Shirley Plantation. His Geneva Bible's frontispiece was the inspiration for Franklin's design for the First Great Seal of the United States

Edward Hill's original 450-acre (180 ha) plot was expanded by marriage and gradual land acquisition. In 1660, Hill patented 2,476-acre (1,002 ha) in Charles City County, including the 416-acre (168 ha) island. When he died several years later, the land passed to Edward Hill II, who continued as owner during Bacon's Rebellion in 1676. One of these men built the Hill House, the first mansion at Shirley, which was torn down c. 1870. The younger Hill sided with Governor William Berkeley, and Bacon's rebels plundered the property, perhaps in part because the King's commissioners who later examined the rebellion found him to be "the most hated man of all the county where he lived". Hill was also the subject of the "Charles City Grievances" of May 10, 1677, which accused him of misappropriating county taxes for his own use.

His son Edward Hill III inherited the property in 1700 and continued its plantation economy. However, Edward Hill III's only son, Edward Hill IV, died at 16 of consumption, leaving no male heirs and only three sisters. Edward Hill III died in 1726, and his will bequeathed Shirley plantation to his youngest daughter, Elizabeth, who had married John Carter (eldest son of Robert "King" Carter) in October 1723. When he died in 1742, his widow remarried Bowler Cocke, who represented nearby Henrico County and helped raise the heir, future burgess, and patriot Charles Hill Carter (1732–1806).

The construction of the present mansion and outbuildings began c. 1723. The mansion, called the "Great House", was completed in 1738 and was located close to the original house built by the Hills that became known as the "Hill House". In 1868, owners signed a contract to demolish the Hill House and use its salvaged building materials to construct the mansion at Upper Shirley.

At least eight generations of the Hill Carter family have occupied the house since 1738. Anne Hill Carter was born at Shirley, who on June 18, 1793, married Henry "Light Horse Harry" Lee in the mansion's parlor. The couple were later parents of Confederate General Robert E. Lee.

The plantation used enslaved people to cultivate cash crops, particularly after the mid-17th century when the flow of indentured servants from England became very few. According to the first Virginia tax census following the American Revolutionary War, in 1787, Charles Hill Carter owned 67 enslaved people above age 16 at Shirley Plantation and another 67 younger enslaved people, along with 16 horses and 70 cattle; and he owned another 16 enslaved adults and 22 enslaved children and additional livestock at his Long Bridge plantation in the same county. In the 19th century, an annual staff of between 70 and 90 enslaved Africans were forced to labor on the plantation, including plowing the fields, cleaning, and cooking.

In 1866, Charles Hill Carter's son and heir, Hill Carter, was forced to retire and divide his estate after he lost the free labor of enslaved people, with the bulk of the estate (the current Shirley Plantation) bequeathed to his son, Robert, and the 'Upper Shirley' portion bequeathed to William Fitzhugh Carter. Upper Shirley is now home to Upper Shirley Vineyards.

The house was placed on the National Register in 1969 and recognized as a National Historic Landmark in 1970. In mid-1979 and mid-1980, teams of archaeologists from the College of William and Mary excavated the site of Hill house, the slave quarters constructed c. 1843, and indigenous settlements predating European colonization.

== Architecture ==
The three-story "Great House" is constructed in the Georgian style with red brick walls and white trim boards on a square foundation. The house has no actual front door, as both the riverside and courtyard side entrances have a two-story portico with Doric columns supporting a pediment. The entrance is in the center, framed by a pair of long rectangular windows on either side. Inside the main hall, the house's famous carved walnut "floating" or "flying" cantilevered staircase rises for three stories without visible means of support and is the only one of its kind in America. The hipped roof rests on an entablature containing dentil moldings. Dormers and two large brick chimneys break up the roof. In the center of the roof is a white pedestal supporting an overturned pineapple.

The house is surrounded by several support buildings, including a two-story kitchen with living quarters for the enslaved Africans, a two-story laundry with living quarters, a smokehouse, a stable building, an ice house, a large storehouse, and a dovecote.

== Shirley Plantation today ==
The upper floors are occupied by members of the eleventh generation of the Hill Carter family, while the bottom floor was open for tours until 2026. Shirley remains a working farm and commercial concern.

=== Weanack Land and Port Tobacco ===
In 1994, the owners of Shirley Plantation separated 280 acres (1.1 km^{2}) of land, called Weanack Land for a native village in the area in the 1620s, from the main estate to construct maritime facilities on the James River. The area had previously been used for sand and gravel mining, and the resulting barren depressions were to be reclaimed using dredged spoil from other waterways. Higher quality material is used for agricultural reclamation for no-till farming on the plantation, while lower quality soil is used for elevational fill and then capped.

Part of Weanack Land is Port Tobacco, a 60-acre (24 ha) deep-water port facility for receiving reclaimed materials. Dredged material has been brought in from Naval Weapons Station Earle in New Jersey, the Woodrow Wilson Bridge replacement in Metropolitan Washington, D.C., the Nice Bridge replacement in Maryland and the Hampton Roads Bridge–Tunnel expansion in Virginia.

== See also ==
- List of oldest companies
- List of National Historic Landmarks in Virginia
- National Register of Historic Places listings in Charles City County, Virginia
