= Charlestown Five Cent Savings Bank =

- The building's front exterior
- Interactive map of the Charlestown Five Cent Savings Bank area

General information
- Type: Bank
- Location: Boston, Massachusetts, United States
- Coordinates: 42.37539°N 71.06367°W

The Charlestown Five Cent Savings Bank is a historic building in Charlestown, Boston, in the U.S. state of Massachusetts. It received landmark status in 1981 by the Boston Landmarks Commission.
