= Bixler's =

American jewelry company

Bixlers
- Industry: Jewelry
- Founded: 1785
- Website: https://bixlers.com/

Bixler's is an American jewelry company. Founded in 1785, the company is the oldest continuously operating jewelry company in the United States.

Bixler's is the official licensed jeweler of the Ultimate Fighting Championship (UFC). The company provide gemstones, enameling, engraving and customization of the UFC Championship Belts. In addition to creating custom pieces for UFC fans, Bixler's handcrafted one-of-a-kind collectors pieces have been commissioned by the UFC.

Bixler's operates a single boutique located in Allentown, Pennsylvania. The company's jewelry atelier is located in Montreal, Canada. Its corporate headquarters are located in Burlington, Vermont.

== History ==
Bixler's was founded in Easton, Pennsylvania in 1785 by Christian Bixler III, nine years after the United States (Note: As the Thirteen Colonies) declared independence from the British Empire in 1776. Christian III was a veteran of the Revolutionary War and a master clockmaker, specializing in handcrafted tall case grandfather clocks. Many of Christian III's original clocks are still in circulation to this day. Christian III was particular about the materials and methods used in his clocks. He constantly sought more refined techniques to avoid any irregular timekeeping, which was a common fault in clocks of the period. He introduced new art forms to clockmaking, such as fine drilling, minute polishing, and the engineering of intricate mechanisms inside the clocks that revolved with very little friction.

Christian Bixler III purchased land from a relative of William Penn, the founder of Pennsylvania, to open Bixler's Jewelers and Silversmiths.

In 1825, Christian Bixler III's son Daniel became the first of many descendants to carry on the family business. This transition would establish Bixler's as one of the oldest continuously operated family businesses in the United States of America.

In 1934, during the Great Depression, Bixler's converted half of its boutique into a library to support its community.

In 1948, Bixler's became a member of the American Gem Society.

In 2020, Bixler's became a member of the Responsible Jewellery Council (RJC).
