= Breck's =

Dutch-American gardening company

- Type: Privately Held
- Industry: Mail-Order Gardening
- Founded: 1818 Boston, Massachusetts US
- Headquarters: Guilford, Indiana, US, Noordwijkerhout, Netherlands
- Products: Dutch bulbs, perennials, tulips, irises, lilies
- Website: www.brecks.com

Breck's is a mail order gardening company and importer of Dutch flower bulbs. Based in Guilford, Indiana, and Noordwijkerhout, Netherlands, Breck's was founded in 1818. Originally a family-owned garden supply business, Breck's gradually expanded into a catalog company. Breck's is now the largest U.S. importer of Dutch bulbs.

== History ==
Joseph Breck (1794–1873) was born in Medfield, Massachusetts. He founded his business, Joseph Breck & Company, in 1818, in Boston, Massachusetts. From 1822 to 1846, Breck was the editor of the New England Farmer, one of the earliest agricultural magazines established in the United States, and the first of its kind in New England. In 1833, Breck wrote a book called The Young Florist, which is an ongoing dialogue between two young gardeners in order to present information about flowers and natural history as it relates to flower cultivation. In 1840, Breck published his company's first catalog, the New England Agricultural Warehouse and Seed Store Catalogue, to promote his company's products. The catalog included illustrations and horticultural literature to accompany product listings.

In 1856, he published The Flower Garden, a book about the cultivation of ornamental plants such as perennials, annuals, shrubs and evergreen trees. One of the founding members of the American Seed Trade Association, Breck was the president of the Massachusetts Horticultural Society from 1859 to 1862. Breck bought a house in Brighton, MA, in 1854 and lived there until his death. The company continued into the 1950s as a garden supply company, when Luther Adams "Bo" Breck, the fifth-generation Breck, transformed the family business into a Dutch bulb importer and flower bulb catalog company.

In 2001, Breck's was acquired by Gardens Alive! when then-parent company Foster & Gallagher went bankrupt.
