= Tendercrop Farm at the Red Barn =

Company

Coordinates: 43.1659°N 70.8465°W

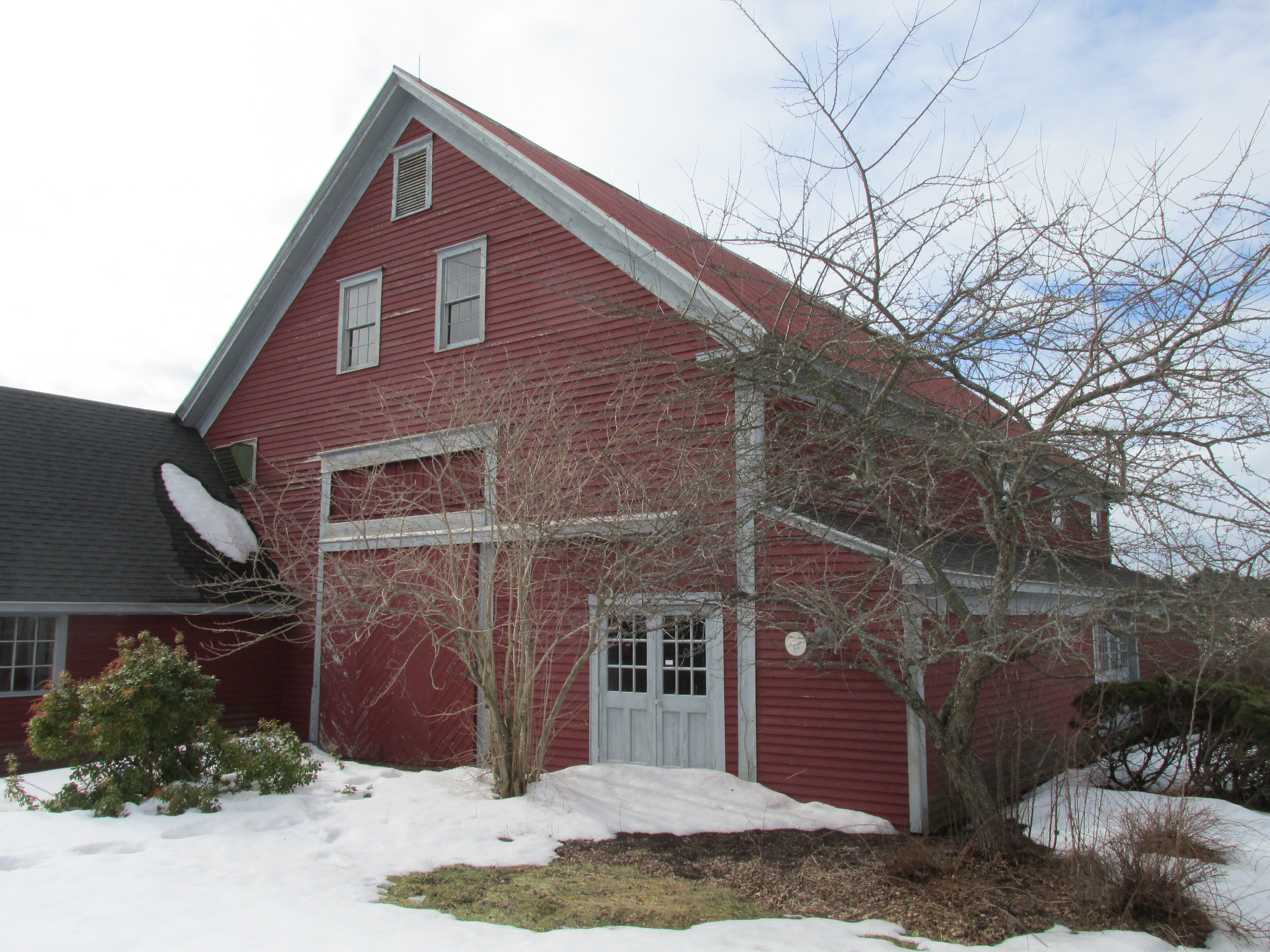
Tuttle's Red Barn

The former Tuttle Farm of Dover, New Hampshire, United States, is located between the tidal waters of the Bellamy and Piscataqua rivers on Dover Point and operated continuously from 1632 until its acquisition and merger with Massachusetts-based Tender Crop Farm in 2013.

Tuttle Farm, now known as Tender Crop, was referred to as the oldest family-owned farm in the United States; however, this claim was challenged until 2013. The Shirley Plantation in Charles City, Virginia, was founded in 1613 and has been in operation since 1638. It claimed to be (and is currently) America’s oldest family-owned farm.

== History ==
The Tuttle Farm was passed down across eleven generations of Tuttles from father to son, from when John Tuttle arrived in the New World bearing a land grant from Charles II of England. The original 20-acre (81,000 m^{2}) parcel granted to John Tuttle was expanded over time and reached 240 acres (97 ha) at its peak during the twentieth century. The farm currently comprises approximately 134 acres (54 ha).

There was one break in the farm's father and son chain of ownership when Joseph Edward Tuttle died while his only son was a baby. Joseph's brother William Tuttle inherited the farm upon Joseph's death and served as the caretaker of the farm for 40 years until he died in 1911, at which point ownership of the farm passed to George Tuttle, the then-mature son of Joseph Edward Tuttle.

== Farm buildings and crops ==
The Tuttle Farm compound includes the Tuttles' twelve-room antique colonial residence (circa 1780), which has been updated with greenhouses, storage barns, and a modern retail facility. The Tuttle Farm currently cultivates 40 acres (160,000 m^{2}) of vegetables and berries. The farm's largest crop is sweet corn. 25% of the Tuttle Farm is classified as wetland and 60% is wooded.

The Tuttle Farm includes a modern upscale 10,000-square-foot (930 m^{2}) retail facility constructed in 1987 adjoining an old New England barn, the original "Tuttle's Red Barn".

It now conducts business as Tendercrop Farm at the Red Barn. It also offers a variety of groceries, plants, gift items, and gourmet foods from many countries.

== Sale ==
Will Tuttle (William Penn Tuttle III) was the last Tuttle owner of Tuttle Farm. Will Tuttle and his older sister, Lucy Alger Tuttle, were the co-owners of Tuttle's Red Barn.

In 2007, Will Tuttle sold a conservation easement on the Tuttle Farm to the Strafford Rivers Conservancy for $2.79 million, with funding provided by the City of Dover ($1.195 million), the New Hampshire Department of Transportation ($1.34 million) and the Federal Farm and Ranchland Protection Program ($155,643).

On July 25, 2010, the Tuttle Farm and Tuttle's Red Barn were listed for sale. Will Tuttle, the Tuttle Farm's owner, cited exhaustion, his age (in his sixties), and the lack of a younger generation of Tuttles showing interest in taking over the Tuttle Farm as his reasons for offering the farm for sale.

The original price was $3.35 million. Foster's Daily Democrat reports it sold in October 2013 for a little over $1 million to Matt Kozazcki, who owns a farm in Newbury, Massachusetts.
