= Joseph Breck (curator) =

American curator (1885–1933)

Joseph Henry Breck
- Born: 1885; Massachusetts, United States
- Died: August 2, 1933; Switzerland
- Occupation: Curator

Joseph Henry Breck (1885–1933) was an American curator and museum director. During his career he served as a Director of the Minneapolis Society of Fine Arts, Curator of the Decorative Arts Department of The Metropolitan Museum of Art, assistant director of The Metropolitan Museum of Art, and first Director of The Cloisters.

== Early life ==
Breck was born in Massachusetts in 1885. He attended Harvard University, where he majored in art history. While at Harvard, he met and formed a lifelong friendship with Herbert Winlock, who would later become a director of The Metropolitan Museum of Art. Breck wrote for the Harvard Lampoon, where his contributions revealed an interest in art. After graduation he traveled to Europe, continuing his studies in art with specific interest in the Renaissance and sculpture. Upon returning to Harvard for graduate studies, Breck was encouraged by Winlock to join the Metropolitan Museum.

== Career ==
In 1909 he was hired as assistant curator under Wilhelm Valentiner in the Department of Decorative Arts. In 1914, he left the Metropolitan Museum and was appointed director of the recently established Minneapolis Society of Fine Arts, where he was instrumental in the creation of the Minneapolis Institute of Arts. He returned to the Metropolitan in 1917 as the curator of the Decorative Arts Department and assistant director of the museum. The collections and scope of the Decorative Arts Department so greatly expanded that after Breck's death in 1933 it was divided into three departments: Renaissance and Modern Art, Medieval Art, and the American Wing.

In 1932, Breck was named the first director of the new branch of the Metropolitan Museum, The Cloisters. Though he did not live to see the building completed, Breck worked intensely on the arrangement of its collections and the planning of the structure itself. In his obituary in The New York Times, it was pointed out that he took it upon himself to make "a study of further manuscripts and tapestries to find out what flowers were illustrated in Medieval times so that the new Cloisters’ garden might reflect the Medieval spirit."

Breck had a firm understanding and appreciation for not only design but how objects should be displayed. In 1912 at a meeting of the American Association of Museums held at the Metropolitan Museum, Breck, Museum Secretary Henry W. Kent and curator Durr Friedley set up cases and created displays demonstrating two methods: “good” and “bad”. These installation guidelines which featured less crowding, good light, clear lines and glass display cases with muted backgrounds, became the standard for art museum installation. Breck wrote extensively on display and installation with the “purpose of benefitting both historical and visitor point of view.” Breck was associated with many exhibitions at the Museum, including the popular Industrial Arts Exhibitions. His philosophy was that by showing the public well-designed, everyday objects – chairs, tables, curtains – "good taste" could be taught. He stated that these “touch a person more nearly and while a person may not be able to afford a good picture, that it is possible to purchase a good lamp by seeing these examples.” Though somewhat conservative in his taste, Breck displayed for the first time at the Metropolitan examples of Art Deco and Art Nouveau objects. His acquisitions as a curator were considered “remarkably fine.” Breck wrote more than two hundred articles covering the fields of Renaissance art and sculpture, design of objects, and display and installation techniques. He was the author of catalogues for those subjects as well as on individual artists (such as Rodin), exhibitions (the Swedish exhibition) and collections (handbooks on J.P. Morgan & Ballard). He was also a frequent contributor to The Metropolitan Museum of Art Bulletin.

== Death and legacy ==
In the summer of 1933, while on a buying trip for the Museum, Breck died suddenly of a heart attack at the age of 48. Shortly before his death, he had been awarded the Legion d’Honneur for his work in the arts. Considered by some to be a disciplinarian and rather tactless in his manner, Joseph Breck was by-passed by the Museum's board of trustees for the position of Director of the Metropolitan when it became vacant in 1931. The job went, instead, to his old friend Herbert Winlock. Museum President William Sloane Coffin wrote that Joseph Breck's influence and taste was felt in all parts of the Museum: “The Morgan Wing, the galleries on the second floor of Wings K and J, the galleries of medieval and Renaissance decorative arts, The Cloisters, and more recently the new hall of medieval tapestries are a standing testimony to his taste and knowledge in installation and arrangement.”
