= Tipp City, Ohio =

City in Ohio, United States

- City
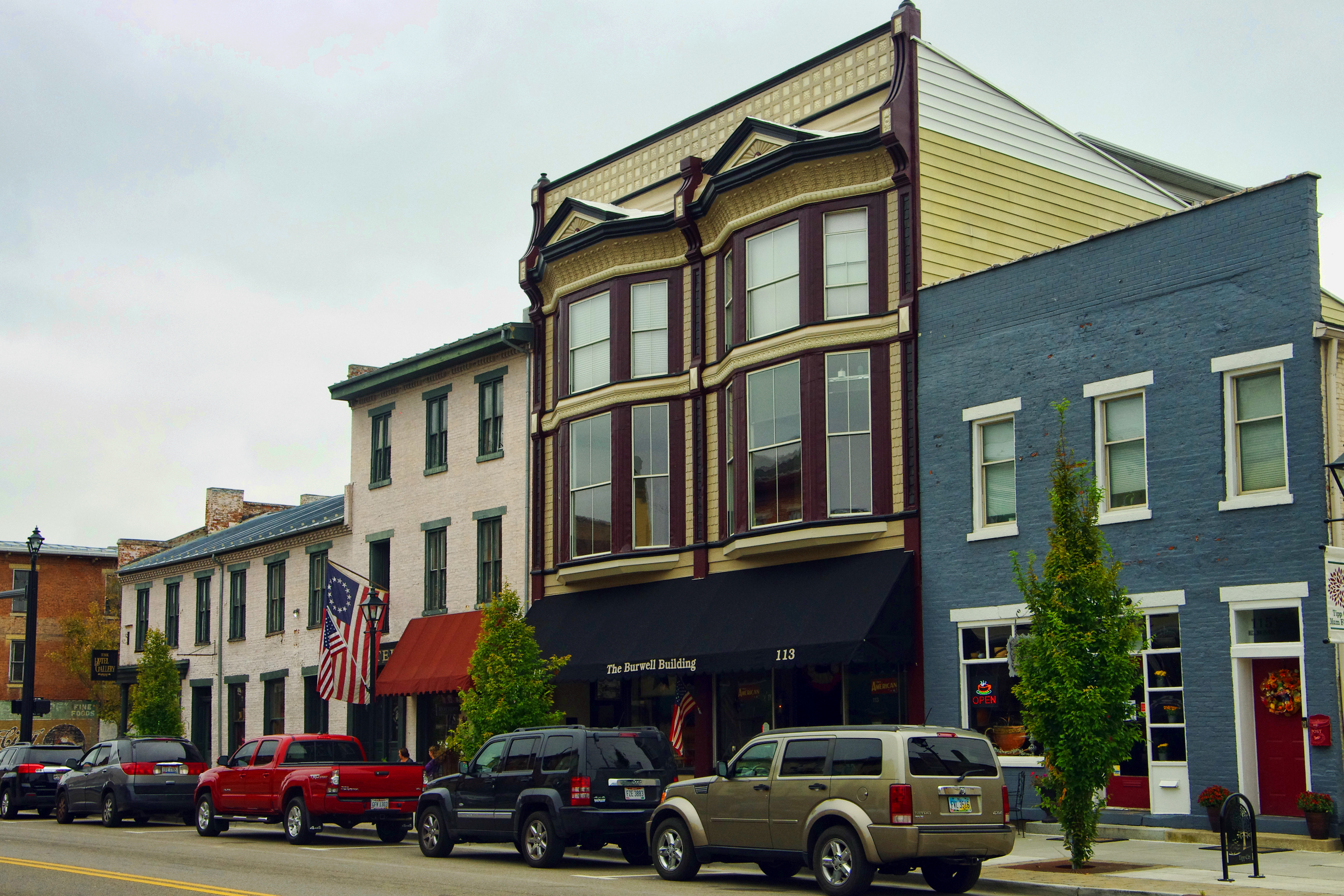
- Old Tippecanoe Main Street Historic District

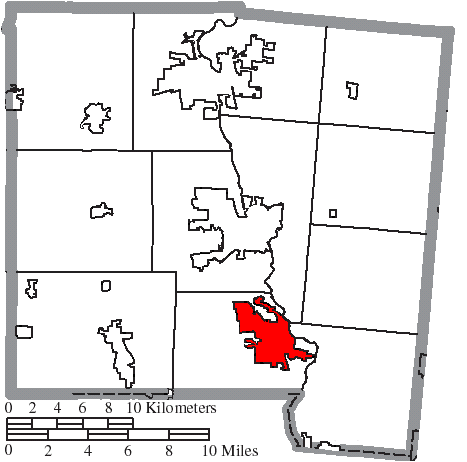
- Location of Tipp City in Miami County

- Location within Ohio Location within the United States
- Coordinates: 39°57′52″N 84°11′12″W
- Country: United States
- State: Ohio
- County: Miami

Government
  - Mayor: Logan Rogers

Area
  - Total: 8.18 sq mi (21.19 km^{2})
  - Land: 8.03 sq mi (20.80 km^{2})
  - Water: 0.15 sq mi (0.39 km^{2})
- Elevation: 886 ft (270 m)

Population (2020)
  - Total: 10,274
  - Density: 1,279/sq mi (493.9/km^{2})
- Time zone: UTC−5 (Eastern (EST))
  - Summer (DST): UTC−4 (EDT)
- ZIP Code: 45371
- Area codes: 937, 326
- FIPS code: 39-76876
- GNIS feature ID: 2397027
- Website: tippcityohio.gov

Tipp City is a city in southern Miami County, Ohio, United States. The population was 10,274 at the 2020 census. Founded in 1840 as Tippecanoe City, it was renamed in 1938 because another town in Ohio was likewise named Tippecanoe. The city lies in the Miami Valley 15 miles (24 km) north of Dayton and sits along Interstate 75 near the Interstate 70 interchange. Tipp City is part of the Dayton metropolitan area.

== History ==
Tippecanoe City was platted in 1840 by John Clark along the developing Miami and Erie Canal. Its name derives from presidential candidate William Henry Harrison's nickname, Tippecanoe, which, Harrison had acquired as commander of U.S. forces at the Battle of Tippecanoe on November 7, 1811.

The early city was a popular stopping-off point for boatmen traveling along the Miami and Erie Canal. The original downtown purportedly included a large number of bars and a red light district. The now dry canal locks can be seen just east of downtown. Development of the railroads in the 1850s and 1860s put the canals out of business and slowed the city's initially rapid growth. Ruins of a repair shop (yard barn) for the old Inter-Urban rail system can still be seen on the outskirts of town. As Tippecanoe City grew, it merged with Hyattsville, a contiguous village located on present-day Hyatt Street. The Hyattsville post office served the entire city in 1862. Near the end of the American Civil War, on January 28, 1865, the Hyattsville post office transitioned to officially become the Tippecanoe City post office.

Three decades before ZIP Codes alleviated most misdeliveries nationwide, in the 1930s the U.S. Postal Service abbreviated the post office's name to Tipp City to resolve delivery errors with Tippecanoe, Ohio. Around 1938, the name Tipp City appears on postal maps.

Tippecanoe High School retains the former full name of the city. The development of U.S. Route 25 (County Road 25-A) and subsequently Interstate 75 brought construction and vibrancy back to the town throughout the 20th century.

On June 8, 2022, a tornado struck Tipp City, causing heavy damage to a Meijer distribution center in the area. The tornado strengthened just before hitting the city. It traveled 13.9 miles before ending near Casstown, Ohio. This and five other tornadoes were part of a tornado outbreak in Ohio, which had six tornadoes strike the state.

This city is famous for the location of Caleb Flynn’s murder of his wife Ashley Flynn.

== Geography ==
Tipp City is located on the Miami River, approximately 10 miles north of Dayton and has direct highway access to Interstate 75.

According to the United States Census Bureau, the city has a total area of 7.64 square miles (19.79 km^{2}), of which 7.53 square miles (19.50 km^{2}) is land and 0.11 square miles (0.28 km^{2}) is water.

== Demographics ==
Historical population
Census	Pop.	Note	%±
1860	949		—
1870	1,204		26.9%
1880	1,401		16.4%
1890	1,465		4.6%
1900	1,703		16.2%
1910	2,038		19.7%
1920	2,426		19.0%
1930	2,559		5.5%
1940	2,879		12.5%
1950	3,304		14.8%
1960	4,267		29.1%
1970	5,090		19.3%
1980	5,595		9.9%
1990	6,027		7.7%
2000	9,221		53.0%
2010	9,689		5.1%
2020	10,274		6.0%
2025 (est.)	10,644		3.6%

=== 2020 census ===
As of the 2020 census, Tipp City had a population of 10,274. The median age was 41.0 years. 23.5% of residents were under the age of 18 and 19.2% of residents were 65 years of age or older. For every 100 females there were 94.9 males, and for every 100 females age 18 and over there were 90.6 males age 18 and over.

99.2% of residents lived in urban areas, while 0.8% lived in rural areas.

There were 4,194 households in Tipp City, of which 30.5% had children under the age of 18 living in them. Of all households, 50.7% were married-couple households, 16.5% were households with a male householder and no spouse or partner present, and 26.4% were households with a female householder and no spouse or partner present. About 29.4% of all households were made up of individuals and 12.8% had someone living alone who was 65 years of age or older.

There were 4,373 housing units, of which 4.1% were vacant. The homeowner vacancy rate was 1.0% and the rental vacancy rate was 3.2%.

Racial composition as of the 2020 census
Race	Number	Percent
White	9,434	91.8%
Black or African American	109	1.1%
American Indian and Alaska Native	30	0.3%
Asian	135	1.3%
Native Hawaiian and Other Pacific Islander	1	0.0%
Some other race	87	0.8%
Two or more races	478	4.7%
Hispanic or Latino (of any race)	236	2.3%

=== 2010 census ===
As of the census of 2010, there were 9,689 people, 3,861 households, and 2,685 families residing in the city. The population density was 1,286.7 inhabitants per square mile (496.8/km^{2}). There were 4,194 housing units at an average density of 557.0 per square mile (215.1/km^{2}). The racial makeup of the city was 95.9% White, 0.6% African American, 0.2% Native American, 1.5% Asian, 0.7% from other races, and 1.2% from two or more races. Hispanic or Latino of any race were 1.6% of the population.

There were 3,861 households, of which 35.5% had children under the age of 18 living with them, 54.3% were married couples living together, 11.0% had a female householder with no husband present, 4.2% had a male householder with no wife present, and 30.5% were non-families. 27.0% of all households were made up of individuals, and 11.7% had someone living alone who was 65 years of age or older. The average household size was 2.48 and the average family size was 3.01.

The median age in the city was 40.3 years. 25.9% of residents were under the age of 18; 7% were between the ages of 18 and 24; 24.2% were from 25 to 44; 27.9% were from 45 to 64; and 15% were 65 years of age or older. The gender makeup of the city was 48.2% male and 51.8% female.

=== 2000 census ===
As of the census of 2000, there were 9,221 people, 3,632 households, and 2,542 families residing in the city. The population density was 1,492.6 inhabitants per square mile (576.3/km^{2}). There were 3,799 housing units at an average density of 615.0 per square mile (237.5/km^{2}). The racial makeup of the city was 97.54% White, 0.25% African American, 0.23% Native American, 0.90% Asian, 0.39% from other races, and 0.69% from two or more races. Hispanic or Latino of any race were 1.20% of the population.

There were 3,632 households, out of which 36.9% had children under the age of 18 living with them, 56.6% were married couples living together, 9.6% had a female householder with no husband present, and 30.0% were non-families. 25.1% of all households were made up of individuals, and 10.7% had someone living alone who was 65 years of age or older. The average household size was 2.51 and the average family size was 3.02.

In the city, the population was spread out, with 28.2% under the age of 18, 7.7% from 18 to 24, 30.1% from 25 to 44, 21.1% from 45 to 64, and 13.0% who were 65 years of age or older. The median age was 36 years. For every 100 females, there were 93.9 males. For every 100 females age 18 and over, there were 89.9 males.

The median income for a household in the city was $48,675, and the median income for a family was $62,991. Males had a median income of $44,917 versus $27,973 for females. The per capita income for the city was $24,118. About 3.8% of families and 5.2% of the population were below the poverty line, including 6.5% of those under age 18 and 2.4% of those age 65 or over.

== Economy ==
Tipp City functions as a bedroom community north of Dayton, and includes light manufacturing, small businesses, and family-owned restaurants, serving the local community and travelers along I-75.

== Arts and culture ==
The cultural focus of Tipp City is largely based on high school and community-gathering events. In the fourth week of September each year, the city, in partnership with local garden center Spring Hill Nurseries, puts on the Mum Festival, the largest community event of the year, attracting visitors from neighboring towns and cities to the parade, car cruise-in, and festival grounds. Other community events include Canal Days (the third weekend in May), Independence Day fireworks, and Tippecanoe High School "Red Devil" football games. The Miami County Visitors Bureau, as well as the Tipp City Visitors Bureau, maintains a list of upcoming special events.

In past years, Tipp City has been home to the Trans Am Nationals Friday night "cruise-in" during late August.

=== Tipp City in popular culture ===
"Tipp City" is the only single-released song in the album Pacer (1995) of Ohioan alternate-rock band The Amps.

== Parks and recreation ==
Staffed by four full-time employees, the Parks Division is responsible for the maintenance of City Park and Kyle Park, as well as eight neighborhood parks and the Nature Center. Park facilities include tennis courts, basketball courts, a swimming pool, athletic fields, picnic shelters, playground equipment, nature trails, a driving range, batting cages, a community canoe livery, and a boat ramp on the Great Miami River. City Park is also home to a historic structure called the "Roundhouse," a favorite spot for family picnics and reunions. Tipp-Monroe Community Services hosts a summer playground at the Roundhouse for eight weeks, while organizations such as the Mum Festival Committee utilize the facility for their annual events.

=== Tipp City Bike Trail ===
The Miami County Bike Trail is Tipp City's addition to the Buckeye Trail. It is a north–south paved trail that stretches the length of Miami County, allowing bikers, hikers, and hitch-hikers to follow the path of the Great Miami River and the Miami and Erie Canal. Starting at the Shelby County line, the trail runs through the south end of Piqua, Troy, and Tipp City before connecting with the Montgomery County Jail just south of the city.

The Tipp City portion of the trail consists of three sections:

1. The first stage, completed in July 2005, runs from Main Street at Canal Lock Park, north past the Aquatic Center, west of the baseball fields, and along the river before ending at the Nature Center on North Third Street.
2. The second segment, completed in autumn 2008, runs north from the Nature Center to the southern end of the Troy Trail, which begins about 1/2 mile north of Tipp-Cowlesville Road. Monroe Township sponsored this section, with Five Rivers Metroparks as the lead agency. The connector to the Troy Trail was dedicated on October 30, 2008, in a ribbon-cutting ceremony.
3. The third segment, also completed, runs south from Main Street, connects with the bike trail in Kyle Park, and continues south along the east side of Canal Road to the Montgomery County trail at Ross Road. A parking area at Ross Road provides trail access. The Montgomery Trail runs through Huber Heights, under I-70, and south to Needmore Road, ultimately linking to Triangle Park in Dayton.

These completed segments allow users to travel from Tipp City to downtown Dayton via a continuous bike path.

== Government ==
Tipp City uses the council-manager government system. In this system, the mayor is the ceremonial head, selected by the council from among its members. The Council President is likewise selected and presides over each council meeting. The council chooses a City Manager, who holds administrative authority over the city government. Council members are selected on a nonpartisan, at-large ballot.

== Education ==
Tipp City Exempted Village Schools serve the city proper and the surrounding Monroe Township. The buildings are located on three campuses and serve kindergarten through 12th grade. The MVCTC provides vocational training to secondary students. While Bethel Local Schools has a Tipp City mailing address, it is not affiliated with Tipp City Exempted Village Schools and serves students from parts of Tipp City, Huber Heights, and Bethel Township.

=== Tipp City Exempted Village Schools ===
- Broadway Elementary School, grades K–2
- L.T. Ball Intermediate School, grades 3–5
- Tippecanoe Middle School, grades 6–8
- Tippecanoe High School, grades 9–12

=== Bethel Local School District ===
- Bethel Elementary School, grades K–5
- Bethel Middle School, grades 6–8
- Bethel High School, grades 9–12

== Media ==
Newspapers

- Weekly Record Herald
- Tippecanoe Gazette

Online news resource

- TippNews DAILY, free online-only publication featuring citizen journalism

Internet radio

- Get Social Radio, 24/7 online broadcast with weather, news, sports, talk, and music

Public-access television

- KIT-TV, cable channel 5 on Time Warner Cable

No longer in publication

- Tipp City Independent Voice, ceased publication July 22, 2009
- Tipp City Herald, ceased publication late 2008

== Notable people ==
- Rachael Bade, journalist
- Ben Sauls, professional American football player
