= Christopher Holder =

English Quaker evangelist (1631–1688)

- Born: 1631; Alveston, Gloucester, England
- Died: 13 June 1688 (aged 56–57); Almondsbury, Gloucester, England
- Occupation: Quaker activist
- Spouse(s): (1) Mary Scott (2) Hope Clifton
- Children: (first wife) Mary, Elizabeth (second wife) Christopher, Hope, Patience, Patience (2nd), John, Content, Ann

Christopher Holder (1631–1688) was an early Quaker evangelist who was imprisoned and whipped, had an ear cut off, and was threatened with death for his religious activism in the Massachusetts Bay Colony and in England. A native of Gloucestershire, near Bristol in western England, Holder became an early convert to the Society of Friends, and in 1656, at the age of 25, made his first voyage to New England aboard the Speedwell to spread his Quaker message. All of the Quakers in his group were imprisoned, and then sent back to England on the same ship. Undeterred, Holder returned to New England aboard the small barque Woodhouse, landing in New Amsterdam in August 1657 despite few predictions of success. Though young, he was a leader among the eleven Quaker missionaries that fanned out among the American colonies. Holder, with his frequent companion John Copeland, went north to begin their evangelistic efforts in the face of increasingly threatening anti-Quaker laws. With little success on Martha's Vineyard, they moved to Cape Cod in the Plymouth Colony where they were warmly received in Sandwich, establishing the earliest Quaker meeting in America.

From Sandwich, Holder and Copeland moved on to Plymouth, also in the Plymouth Colony, and then several towns in the Massachusetts Bay Colony before being apprehended by Puritan authorities in Salem, and taken to Boston for imprisonment. Despite being cruelly flogged, and held for nearly three months, Holder, Copeland and another companion were able to write the first Quaker Declaration of Faith while in jail. After being released late in 1657 he returned to England and visited the Barbados, but was back in New England to continue his missionary work in early 1658. Returning to Sandwich with Copeland in April, the men were arrested and scourged, but not detained for long. Following time to recover in Rhode Island, a haven for Quakers, the men returned to Boston in June, being quickly apprehended. This time, in addition to a lengthy imprisonment and frequent whippings, the men faced the escalating Puritan laws, having their right ears cut off. Stalwart in the face of their mutilations, the men were eventually released. Holder went south to continue his missionary work during the winter, but returned to Massachusetts in 1659. The Puritans had by now enacted capital punishment for defying an order of banishment, and though Holder was arrested again that summer, it may have been his social position and education that compelled the authorities to allow him to sail back to England. Five days after his release, however, two men, William Robinson and Marmaduke Stephenson, became the first to hang as Quaker martyrs in Massachusetts.

In England Holder was able to confer with Quaker founder George Fox, and was likely involved in the excitement of new religious freedoms emanating from the Declaration of Breda and from the influence of Quaker Edward Burrough with the king. Holder was back in New England by 1663, but continued to travel extensively between New England, England, and the West Indies. He became a resident of Newport, Rhode Island, and twice married to Quaker activists. He was so highly respected in Rhode Island that during the colony's devastation during King Philip's War, he was one of 16 colonial leaders whose counsel was sought in April 1676 during the very difficult times. Holder had returned to England by the early 1680s, where, following continuing persecution of Quakers, he was arrested on several occasions and imprisoned for more than a year. Following his release in 1685, he lived just a few more years, dying in Gloucestershire in 1688. He is best remembered for his leadership, evangelism, and sufferings in confronting the cruel anti-Quaker laws in the Massachusetts colony.

== Early life ==
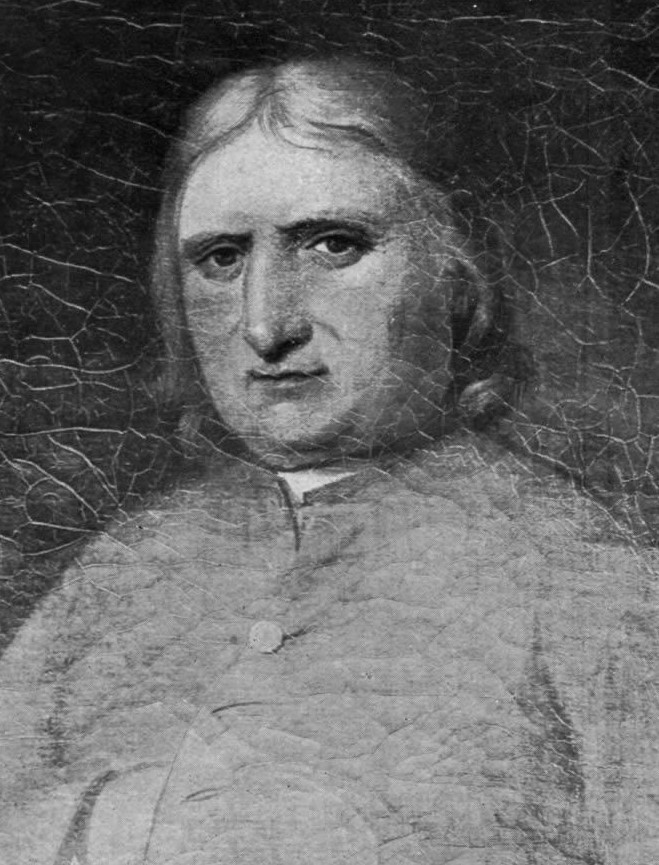
George Fox founded the Quaker religion in about 1647

Almost nothing is currently known about the early life of Christopher Holder. He was born in Gloucestershire, near Bristol in western England, in about 1631 based on his age of 25 on a ship passenger list in 1656. As a very young man he became an avid member of the Society of Friends, a religious group commonly called Quakers, founded by George Fox about 1647.

The Quakers did not believe in baptism, formal prayer or the Lord's Supper, nor did they believe in an ordained ministry. Each member was a minister in his or her own right, women were treated essentially as men in matters of spirituality, and they relied on an "Inner Light of Christ" as their source of spiritual inspiration above the scriptures as found in the Bible. In addition to denouncing the clergy and refusing to support it with their tithes, they claimed liberty of conscience as an inalienable right and demanded the separation of church and state. Their worship consisted of silent meditation, though those moved by the Spirit would at times make public exhortations. They abstained from the customs of bowing or men removing their hats, would not take an oath, and would not fight in wars. The Puritans in Massachusetts viewed Quakers as being among the most reprehensible of heretics.

Holder would spend much of his life in jail for his religious activism, being jailed as early as 1655 in Ilchester, Somerset for refusing to remove his hat. By the early 1650s Fox had been sending Quaker missionaries into Wales and Ireland, and by 1656 he deemed it time to send evangelists to the American colonies, an undertaking readily embraced by Holder. The first Quakers to arrive in the Massachusetts Bay Colony were Mary Fisher and Ann Austin, who landed in Boston in the early summer of 1656 aboard the Swallow. Although there was no law barring their presence, they were jailed for three weeks and sent back to England.

== Visit to New England aboard the Speedwell ==
The second group of Quaker missionaries to leave England for New England sailed on the small ship Speedwell. Robert Locke was the master, and the passenger list, dated at Gravesend on 30 May 1656, included 40 names. The names of eight passengers were marked with a 'Q', indicating that they were Quakers and signifying that officials in England were already concerned about the religious fervor of these people. Holder, aged 25, was one of the eight, whose home was given as Winterbourne and others included his companion, John Copeland, aged 28, from Holderness, a 21 year old convert named Sarah Gibbons and Dorothy Waugh.

The ship landed in Boston on 27 July 1656, (calendar differences may make this September) and the four men and four women who were Quakers were taken in for questioning by the authorities. They were questioned primarily on their religious doctrines, and both Holder and Copeland, as leaders of this group, likely surprised the authorities with their thorough command of the Bible; Holder was also well versed in the law. The group of eight was jailed, though Holder let it be known that there was no law for detaining them. When Holder asked Governor Endicott why they had been deprived of their liberty, the governor threatened them with hanging by replying "Take heed ye break not our ecclesiastical laws, for then ye are sure to stretch by a halter."

The Quakers had their books and pamphlets publicly burned, and while they were imprisoned the order given to the jail keeper on 18 August 1656 was to keep the "abominable tenets of the Quakers" from being spread and to keep the Quakers "close prisoners, not suffering them to speak or confer with any person, nor permitting them to have paper or ink." While the group was still in jail, a law was passed on 14 October 1656 assessing a 100-pound fine to the commander of any vessel bringing Quakers into the colony. After nearly three months of confinement, the group of eight Quakers was put back on the Speedwell, and sent back to England.

== Return to New England aboard the Woodhouse ==
As soon as Holder arrived back in England, he was ready to turn around and go back to New England to fulfill his mission. He was of sufficient means to finance an expedition, but a ship was needed. Holder asked the master of the Speedwell to return his group to Boston, but Locke would not do it in the face of a 100-pound fine. However, Holder found a Quaker ship builder named Robert Fowler who had just finished a small barque and given it the name Woodhouse. Fowler was willing to offer the small craft for the trans-Atlantic trip, feeling he had been "divinely commissioned". Without any knowledge of navigation, he offered to captain the vessel to America "on the Lord's service". When the ship sailed, Fowler was one of 17 people aboard, of whom he and five others were crew members, consisting of three men and three boys. Among the eleven passengers were several who had been on the earlier Speedwell mission, including Holder and Copeland, but also including William Robinson, who would later be hanged as the first of the four Boston martyrs.

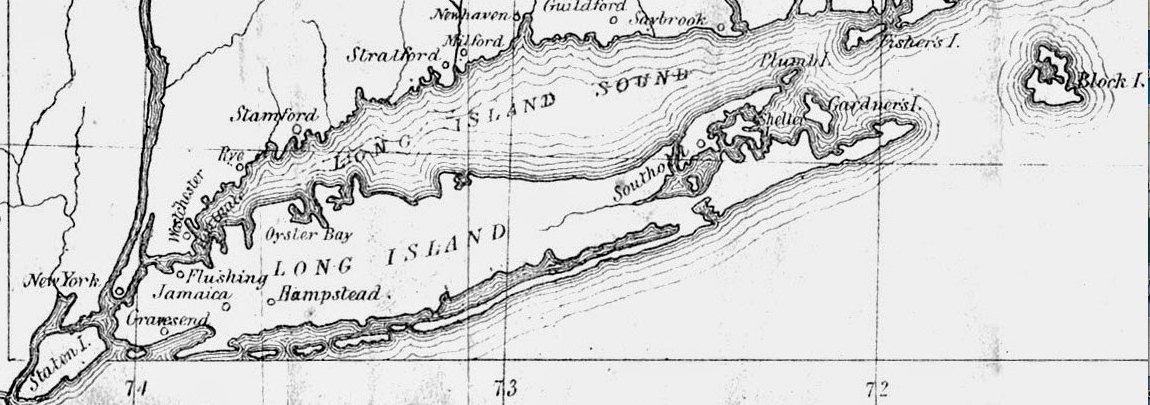
The Woodhouse sailed through Long Island Sound in late May 1657, landing on the first day of June.

The vessel departed on 1 April 1657 "entirely inadequate for the purpose", wrote historian Charles Holder, and an observer added, "they did go on in the name and power of the Lord." Weather required the ship to put in at Portsmouth, then again at Southampton, until on 11 April it finally cleared the English coastline for the open sea. The group sailed without a compass, or any knowledge of navigation, with Fowler writing, "We saw the Lord leading our vessel as if it were a man leading a horse by the head; we regarding [n]either latitude or longitude." The original manuscript of the ship's log, endorsed by George Fox, was later kept at the Society of Friends in London. Its lengthy title is telling: "A true relation of the voyage undertaken by me, Robert Fowler, with my small vessel the Woodhouse, but performed by the Lord like as he did Noah's ark wherein he shut up a few righteous persons and landed them safe even at the hill Ararat."

Following its journey, the ship arrived along the coastline of Long Island in late May, and landed at New Amsterdam on 1 June 1657 after seven weeks at sea. Once ashore, a majority of the passengers headed south to Maryland and Virginia for their mission. Holder and Copeland then took the ship, and headed back to New England, sailing up the Narraganset Bay to Providence. Holder attempted to give a message from George Fox to the town's founder, Roger Williams, but Williams was not interested. Williams had some serious theological differences with the Quakers, writing that "they admit no interpreter but themselves, for the spirit within they say, gave forth the Scripture, and is above the Scripture ... and that all they do and say is scripture--Papists and Quakers most horribly and hypocritically trample it under their proud feet."

Holder and Copeland stayed at the home of Richard Scott, said to be the first Quaker in Providence. Richard's wife, Katherine Marbury Scott, was a daughter of the Reverend Francis Marbury of London, and a much younger sister of the famed Antinomian heretic Anne Hutchinson, who had been banished from the Massachusetts colony for her religious opinions. Katherine was described as a "grave, sober, ancient woman, of blameless conversation and of good education and circumstances." The Scotts had two daughters, Mary being the older and Patience a pre-teen. In a few years Holder would marry Mary Scott.

== Mission work in Massachusetts ==
On 12 Jun 1657, Copeland wrote a letter to his parents from Providence, saying, "I and Christopher Holder are going to Martha's Vineyard, in obedience to the will of God, which is our joy." From Providence Holder and Copeland sailed on the Woodhouse to Newport, where they stayed with Mary Dyer and her husband William. There they were able to find a fishing boat that would deliver them to Martha's Vineyard. They landed on the island on 16 June and attended the sermon at the local Congregational church presented by Reverend Mayhew. It was customary for parishioners, at the end of a service, to rise and ask questions about the sermon or offer testimony. Accordingly, following Mayhew's sermon, Holder addressed the congregation saying that he "brought the Word as understood by Friends, and were messengers bearing God's love to their brethren in America."

Holder and Copeland persisted with their message following the afternoon and evening meetings, and being offensive to some of the congregation, were ordered to leave, being taken to the beach and left. They were able to hide on the island for a few days until they found some natives willing to paddle them to Cape Cod. Once Holder and Copeland were dropped ashore, they proceeded overland to Sandwich. The town had just lost its minister, and many of the people were receptive to the Quaker message presented by Holder and Copeland. Here the two Quaker ministers orchestrated the first Friends' meeting in America. Although they may have met at the house of a receptive member, they also found a place to meet outside. They gathered by a stream in the woods at a place that was subsequently named "Christopher's Hollow", and the location was still known by that name two and a half centuries later.The two ministers moved on to Plymouth where they met with much more adverse circumstances than in Sandwich. Following several confrontations, including a meeting with the governor, they were served with a warrant directing them to depart the jurisdiction of the Plymouth Colony. They were marched five miles towards Rhode Island and left.

=== Imprisonment ===
"Whereas, it is reported by them that have not a bridle to their tongues, that we, who are by the world called Quakers, are blasphemous, heretics, and deceivers; therefore we who are here in prison, shall in a few words, declare unto all people that may see this the ground of our religion, and the faith that we contend for, and the cause whereof we suffer.

As [for us] we do believe in the only true and living God, the Father of our Lord Jesus Christ, who have made the heavens and earth, the sea and all things in them contained, and doth uphold all things that he hath created by the word of his power, who at sundry times and in divers manners, spake in times past to our fathers, by the prophets, but in these last days he hath spoken unto us, by this Son, whom he hath made heir of all things, by whom he made the world.

Therefore, while you have light, believe in the light, that ye may be children of the light..."

October 1657, House of Correction
Christopher Holder, John Copeland, Richard Doudney

— Quaker Declaration of Faith

During July and August Holder and Copeland visited other communities, including Duxbury, Mansfield, Dedham, Charlestown, Cambridge and Lynn, managing to avoid confrontation with any Massachusetts colonial authorities. When they ultimately arrived at Salem, they were invited to stay at the home of Lawrence and Cassandra Southwick. On 29 August 1657, they did as they had done elsewhere, and attended a service at the Congregational church. Following the sermon, Copeland stood at the back of the church and challenged the message with the Quaker alternatives. Unlike in the other towns, this prompted a much more violent reaction, and the action of a local commissioner was recorded as follows, "after the priest had done, [Holder] was hauled back by the hair of his head and his mouth violently stopped with a glove and handkerchief thrust thereunto with much fury by one of your church members." Holder was unable to breathe, but a man named Samuel Shattuck pushed the perpetrator aside and removed the obstructions from Holder's throat.

Holder, Copeland and Shattuck were then transported to Boston where Shattuck was released with a fine, but the other two men were imprisoned, and held for more than ten weeks. On 23 September 1657 Holder was whipped with thirty stripes "as near as the hangman could in one place, measuring his ground and fetching his strokes with great strength and advantage." A third Quaker, Richard Doudney, had been arrested in Dedham and joined the other two men in jail. While imprisoned, the three men wrote the first Quaker Declaration of Faith. Following their lengthy imprisonment, Holder and the others were banished from the colony, but would return.

Quaker persecution continued in many forms, and the Southwicks that were so supportive of Holder were imprisoned and eventually driven out of the Massachusetts colony. That was not enough for Governor Endicott, however. Lawrence and Cassandra Southwick had a son named Daniel and a daughter named Provided, and Endicott attempted to have these two children put into slavery. No ship master or other person in the colony would be a party to this atrocity, however. The noted Quaker poet, John Greenleaf Whittier wrote the poem The Ballad of Cassandra Southwick about this incident, but the poem was actually about the daughter, Provided, rather than the mother, Cassandra.

=== Puritan reactions to the Quakers ===
Very alarmed by the inroads that the Quaker missionaries were making in New England, a group of commissioners from the United Colonies (Massachusetts, Plymouth, New Haven and Connecticut) addressed a letter to the governor of Rhode Island on 12 September 1657. The document announced the recent arrival of the Quakers, calling them notorious heretics and calling for their speedy removal from the colonies. The United Colonies wanted the Quakers removed from one of their safe havens in Newport, and used the threat of withholding trade as leverage for their position. The Rhode Island colony had just elected Benedict Arnold as its new president in May, and although Arnold was no friend of the Quakers, his reply, endorsed by the four Rhode Island Assistants (one from each town), demonstrated a firm adherence to the Rhode Island doctrine of religious tolerance. He wrote, "Concerning these Quakers (so-called), which are now among us, we have no law among us, whereby to punish any for only declaring by words, &c., theire mindes and understandings concerning the things and days of God, as to salvation and an eternal condition." President Arnold promised Massachusetts Governor Simon Bradstreet that at the next session of the General Assembly the Quakers' "extravagent outgoinges" would be considered, and he hoped some action would be taken to prevent the "bad effects of their doctrines and endeavors." At the March 1658 session of the Assembly, the Rhode Island doctrine of "freedom of different consciences" was reaffirmed, and a letter was sent to the commissioners of the United Colonies stating that if troubles arose from harboring Quakers, the matter would be presented to the supreme authority of England. Following this, no further complaints came from the other colonies.

Nevertheless, the Massachusetts leaders saw the Quakers as being very threatening to the "purity" of their theological doctrines, and seeing that their existing laws did not solve the "Quaker problem", they adopted a plan to enact increasingly brutal laws against them. When the Massachusetts General Court met in October 1657, they assessed increased fines for those who entertained Quakers. As for those who returned to Massachusetts following a banishment order, the new law read:

Every such male Quaker shall for the first offense have one of his ears cut off and be kept at work in the House of Correction until he can be sent away at his own charge; and for the second offense he shall have his other ear cut off. Every woman Quaker...shall be severely whipped...and sent to the House of Correction [and also for a second offense; for a third offense:] Every Quaker, he or she, ...shall have their tongues bored through with a hot iron ... and kept at the House of Correction.

=== Events of 1658 ===
Following his release from jail in late 1657, Holder returned to England, and from there went to the West Indies. In February 1658 he sailed from the Barbados to Rhode Island. John Copeland rejoined Holder in Rhode Island, and they decided to return to Cape Cod. There were now 15 active Quaker missionaries in the American colonies: the original 11 who sailed on the Woodhouse, Mary Dyer from Rhode Island, and three more from the Barbados, one of whom was the future martyr, William Leddra.

John Endecott was the Massachusetts governor during most of the Quaker persecutions.

On 15 April 1658 Holder and Copeland left Rhode Island, and on 23 April they attended a Friends' meeting in Sandwich. During the meeting they were once again apprehended, and marched to Barnstable where they were tied to a post and each given 33 lashes, with many of their brethren watching on as "ear and eye witnesses to the cruelty". They were not thereafter detained for long, and returned to Rhode Island. Seriously injured from the repeated beatings, Holder returned to the home of the Scotts in Providence where he was nursed to health. This may have been when he became engaged to Mary Scott.

The jail time and the scourging had not deterred the determined missionaries, and on 3 June Holder and Copeland returned to Boston. Governor Endicott advised them that they would each have an ear cut off, a punishment that had been used by England's Star Chamber against some Puritans in 1634. The two prisoners were joined in the House of Correction by another Quaker, John Rous from the Barbados. On 17 July 1658 all three men were taken to a private cell where the amputations took place. The authorities would not allow it to be done publicly, certain of a negative public reaction. Mary Dyer biographer Ruth Plimpton wrote that the men "were so stalwart while their ears were removed, that the persecutors began to feel that this was insufficient punishment."

Word of the cruelty brought increased numbers of sympathizers to Boston to encourage the prisoners. Katherine Scott and her daughters Mary and Patience were accompanied by Mary Dyer and Hope Clifton in visiting the men. William Robinson, who had come on the Woodhouse, and Marmaduke Stephenson also arrived, and all of these people were imprisoned. The aging Katherine Scott met Endicott face to face, calling this a barbarous act, and was given ten stripes of the whip. Following their mutilation, the three men were re-imprisoned and given lashings twice a week until released nine weeks later.

The authorities were becoming increasingly paranoid. Imprisonment, whippings and mutilation did not rid them of their Quaker problem. At the 19 October 1658 meeting of the Massachusetts General Court, a law was passed that any Quaker caught in their jurisdiction would be banished upon pain of death. Such Quaker activism had now become a capital offense.

=== Events of 1659 ===
After leaving Boston in late 1658, Holder went south and joined fellow missionaries Robert Hodgson and William Robinson in Maryland and Virginia. Holder returned to Rhode Island the following spring, and accompanied by 11-year-old Patience Scott and others, returned to Massachusetts. They managed to avoid the authorities for several weeks, and in May Holder wrote a letter to William Robinson to let him know they were in Salem. Marmaduke Stephenson and William Robinson were soon arrested, and then Holder and Patience Scott were likewise arrested. Afraid of public opinion, the authorities were not ready to test their law instituting capital punishment, and the girl was released, while the others were banished. None of them, however, was deterred, with Stephenson and Robinson going up to Salem and Holder going elsewhere in northern Massachusetts.

When Holder returned to Boston in August 1659 he was arrested and once again imprisoned. When Robinson and Stephenson were arrested in Salem, they were brought back to Boston with a large following of friends, and likewise imprisoned. As the word got out, friends came to support the prisoners, and on 8 October 1659 they were visited in prison by Mary Scott, Hope Clifton, and Mary Dyer. Perhaps because of Holder's status and connections, the governor would not have him executed. On 22 November 1659 he was again sentenced to banishment upon pain of death. This time he left for England, hoping to personally appeal for justice there. It was only five days following his release from jail that his friends William Robinson and Matthew Stephenson were hanged in Boston, to become the first two of the four Boston martyrs. Mary Dyer was slated to hang as well, but was reprieved while the rope was around her neck.

== Return to England ==
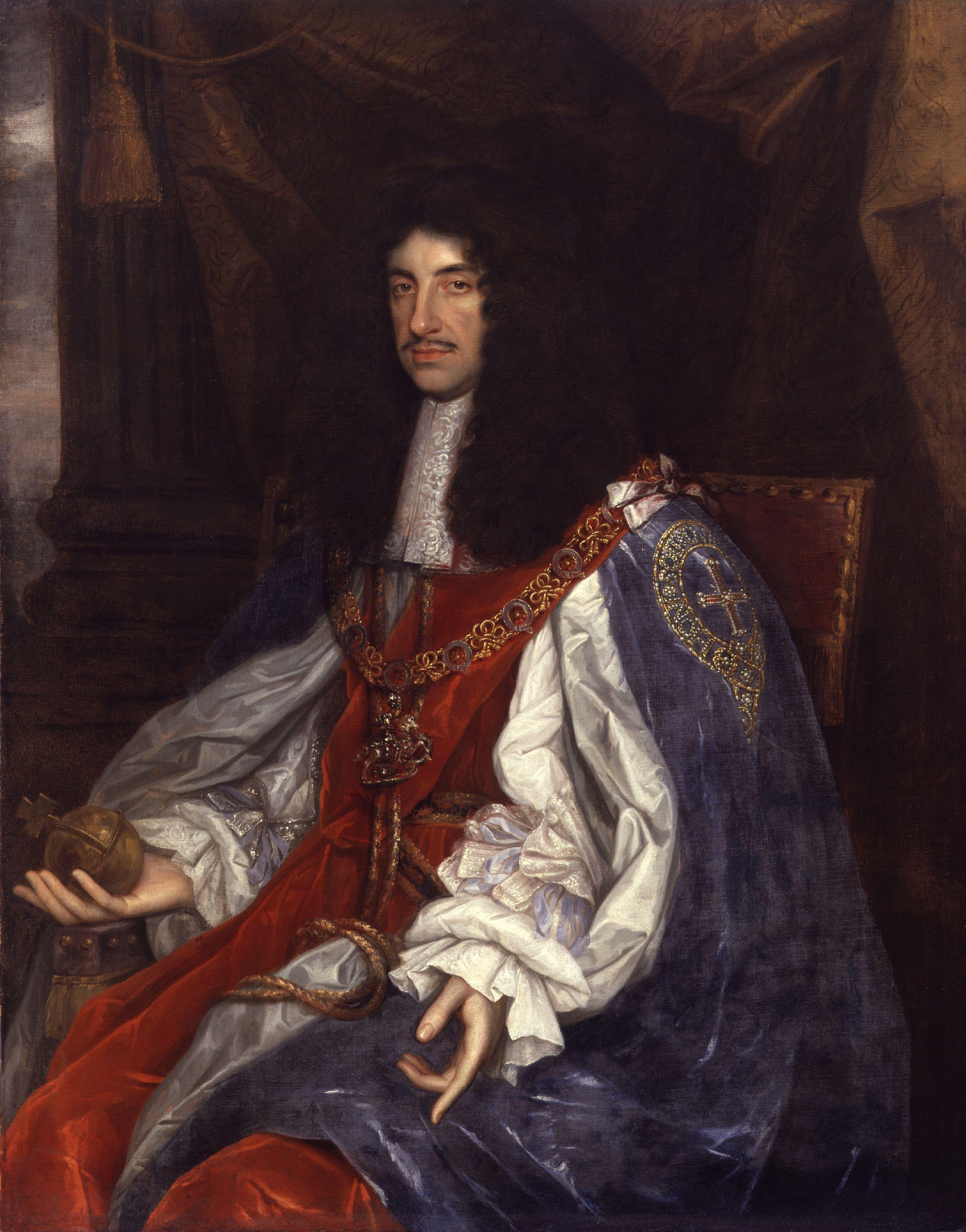
Charles II was restored to the throne under the Declaration of Breda which offered religious liberties to the Quakers.

Traveling with Holder to England were several other friends, including Samuel Shattuck and his fiancée, Mary Scott. On 12 August 1660, in Olveston, Gloucestershire, Holder and Mary Scott were married. There was tremendous excitement in England, following the restoration of King Charles II to the monarchy. The king was reinstated to the throne under the Declaration of Breda in May 1660, and the proclamation not only outlined amnesty for most subjects who were involved in the English Civil Wars and interregnum, but also offered religious freedoms not previously seen in England. A part of the proclamation having a direct effect on the Quakers read, "we do declare a liberty to tender consciences, and that no man shall be disquieted, or called in question, for differences of opinion in matter of religion, which do not disturb the peace of the Kingdom..." About 700 Quakers were released from jails throughout England under the terms of the declaration. The Massachusetts Puritans had drafted a vindication, justifying their capital punishment of the Quakers in Boston, and sent it to the king. This document was quickly countered, however, by a mandamus by the king, issued to Endicott and the other New England governors. This document directed that all Quakers be released from New England jails and that they be sent to England.

Holder, Shattuck and others conferred with George Fox on how to proceed. They determined that Samuel Shattuck would be the one to deliver the mandamus to Endicott personally. A ship with Ralph Goldsmith as the master took Shattuck and others back to New England, and Shattuck, who had been maltreated by Endicott, presented him with the document to which was affixed the royal seal. Endicott was forced to comply, but he refused to send any Quakers back to England in fear that they would testify against him. Whittier wrote of this incident in his poem "The King's Messenger".

Endicott felt compelled to send a delegation to London to clear the Massachusetts authorities of any wrongdoing and to ensure the solvency of the Massachusetts charter. He sent two men, one Simon Bradstreet and the other the minister who was the primary instigator of Quaker persecution, Reverend John Norton. Hearing of the arrival of these men in London, Holder, Copeland, Fox and the father of the Boston martyr William Robinson all charged the two men with murder. The two-man delegation left England assured of the continuance of the charter, but was also given stipulations that were unpopular back in Massachusetts. The men were shunned and greeted with anger upon their return to New England, and while Bradstreet was able to weather the storm, Norton could not, and died the year after returning.

== Later life ==
Following a few years in England, Holder returned to New England, settling in Newport, Rhode Island. He had purchased Patience Island from Roger Williams, and given it to his wife as a wedding gift. He traveled extensively, particularly in 1663, but was likely back in England in 1666 when his son was born in Gloucestershire. In 1672 Holder was with George Fox in New York, during the visit Fox made to New England. In 1673 his name appeared on a list of freeman in Newport.

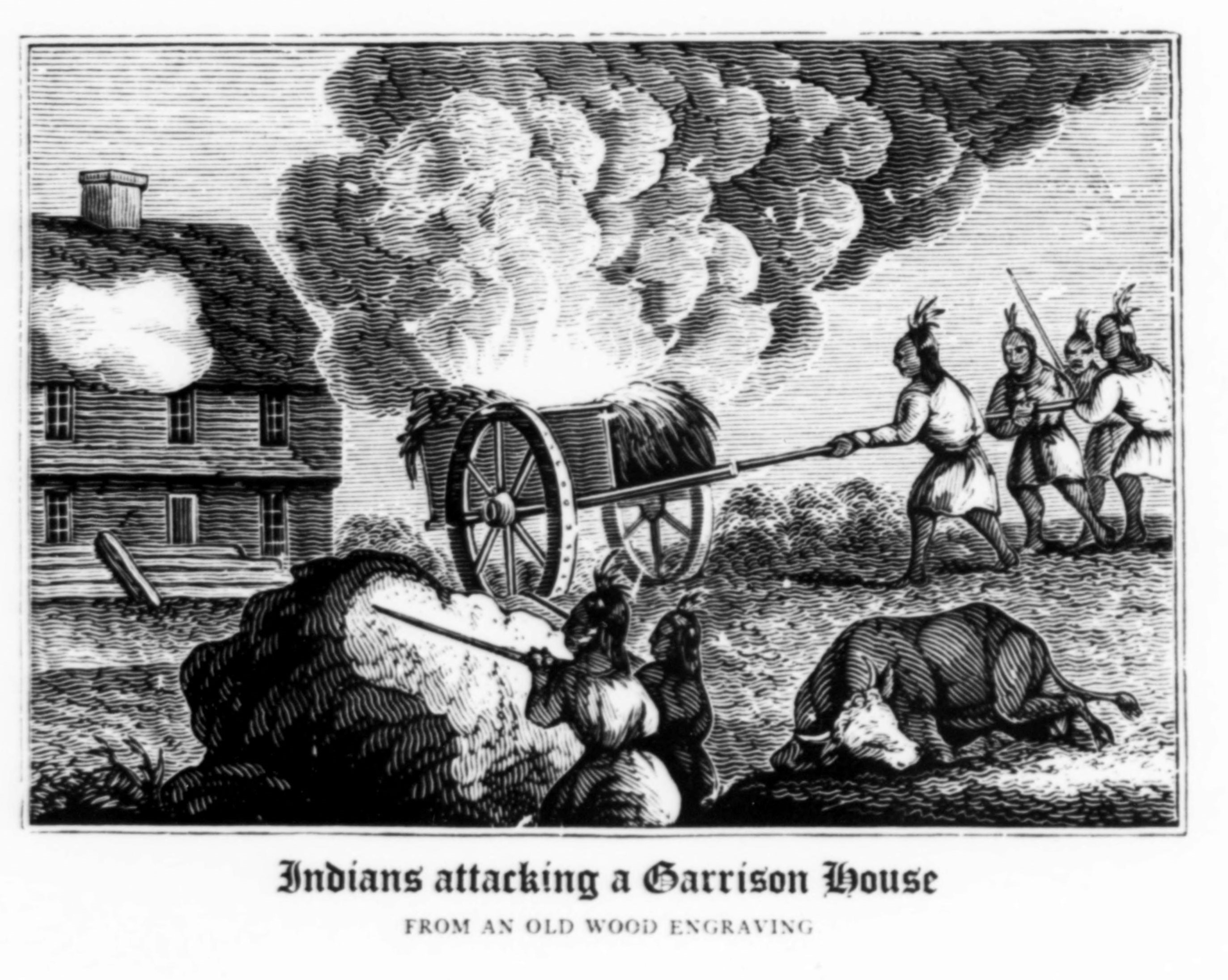
During King Phillips War Holder's counsel was sought by the Rhode Island colony.

That Christopher Holder was very highly regarded in Rhode Island is evident from events in the mid-1670s. From 1675 to 1676, King Philip's War, "the most disastrous conflict to ever devastate New England," left the mainland towns of Rhode Island in ruins. This confrontation between many indigenous people and the English settlers was named for Metacomet, sachem of the Wampanoags, who was also known as King Philip. Though much more at peace with the Indians than the other colonies, because of geography, the Rhode Island colony took the brunt of damage from this conflict, and the settlements of Warwick and Pawtuxet were totally destroyed, with much of Providence destroyed as well. In April 1676 it was voted by the Rhode Island General Assembly "that in these troublesome times and straits in this Colony, this Assembly desiring to have the advice and concurrence of the most judicious inhabitants, if it may be had for the good of the whole, do desire at their next sitting the company and counsel of Mr. Christopher Holder..." and 15 others.

The last record of Christopher Holder in Rhode Island is when he was taxed in 1680. He was back in England shortly thereafter and in May 1682 was arrested for refusing to take the oath of allegiance. The leniency shown the Quakers in 1660 had regressed, and persecutions had resumed. He was arrested again the following year, and incarcerated in Cornwall until 1685 when King James II once again released all of the Quakers being jailed throughout the kingdom.

== Death and legacy ==
Holder retired from his missionary work following his release, being very tired from his strenuous existence and abuse. His death was recorded as follows: "Christopher Holder of Puddimore, in the county of Somerset, died at Ircott, in the parish of Almondsbury 13, 4 mo. 1688 [13 June 1688], and was buried at Hazewell."

In 1909 philanthropist Olivia Slocum Sage, the widow of Russell Sage, donated a dormitory at Princeton University, which was named in honor of her ancestor, Christopher Holder. The building is a Gothic-style quadrangle located on Nassau Street at the extreme northwest corner of the campus. A tablet embedded in the building's facade provides a memorial to Holder.

== Family ==
Holder was married twice, both of his wives being Quaker activists who were friends of each other and frequently supported their imprisoned Quaker friends. His first wife, Mary Scott, died on 17 October 1665, and on 30 December of the same year he married Hope Clifton, the daughter of Thomas and Mary Clifton. The Cliftons had also come from Gloucestershire, immigrating to Concord in 1641 and then settling in Providence two years later, and becoming Quaker converts.

Holder had two children with his first wife and seven more with his second. Only the oldest child from each marriage is known to have survived. His older child of his first marriage, Mary (1661–1737) was married to Peleg Slocum (1654–1733), the son of Giles and Joan Slocum; they had ten children. Slocum was a Quaker minister, and the family moved to Dartmouth, Massachusetts where Slocum built the first Quaker meeting house in 1699. The oldest child of Holder's second marriage, Christopher, Jr., was born in Winterbourne, Gloucestershire in 1666. He was married in 1691 to Elizabeth Daniell of Winterbourne, his residence at the time being given as Hallatrow in neighboring Somerset. Christopher Jr. owned land in Newport, Rhode Island, and in 1692 sold 50 acres there to Roger Goulding.

== See also ==
- Mary Dyer
- Boston martyrs
- List of early settlers of Rhode Island
- Colony of Rhode Island and Providence Plantations
