= William Dyre =

Mayor of New York City from 1680 to 1682

14th Mayor of New York City
- In office October 30, 1680 – 1682
- Preceded by: Francis Rombouts
- Succeeded by: Cornelius Van Steenwyk

Personal details
- Born: 1640 Newport, Rhode Island
- Died: 1688 (aged 47–48)

William Dyre (1640–1688) was born in Newport, Rhode Island, who served as the 14th Mayor of New York City from October 30, 1680 until 1682. He was a son of the Quaker martyr Mary Dyer and William Dyer.

He died in 1688 at the age of 48.

== See also ==
- List of mayors of New York City
