= Dyer Island (Rhode Island) =

Island in Newport County, Rhode Island, United States

Coordinates: 41°34′58″N 71°17′56″W

Dyer Island is an island in Narragansett Bay in Rhode Island, United States. It lies off the west coast of Aquidneck Island and is part of Melville CDP, which itself is part of the town of Portsmouth. The island lies between Melville and Prudence Island and is uninhabited and has a land area of 0.12 km² (29.65 acres) and is only 13 feet above sea level.

The salt marshes of Dyer Island are among the last remaining in Rhode Island without mosquito ditches, and the island is home to various shorebirds.

In the seventeenth century, Dyer Island was named after William Dyer, the husband of the Quaker martyr Mary Dyer. William Dyer was one of the founders of Rhode Island, and in 1638 he sailed past the island and requested that it be granted to him, which was done according to Roger Williams and other affiants. William Dyer died in 1676 in Newport, Rhode Island. He is buried in the family cemetery which was located on the family farm in Newport not on Dyer Island in Narragansett Bay. Upon his death the island comprising some 29 acres (0.12 km^{2}); was given to his son William.

In 2001 the Island was purchased by the state of Rhode Island and is now part of the Narragansett Bay National Estuarine Research Reserve, as well as JDSinc.
