= Lawrence and Cassandra Southwick =

Immigrant

Lawrence and Cassandra (née Burnell) Southwick were early immigrants to colonial America and devout Quakers who, along with their children, were severely persecuted for these religious beliefs.

== Early lives ==
Lawrence and Cassandra were married 25 January 1623/4 at Kingswinford, Staffordshire, England. Along with their four surviving children, John, Josiah, Mary and Daniel, the Southwicks emigrated to Salem, Massachusetts, sometime between mid-1637 and early-1639 when they were admitted to the First Church in Salem. Lawrence was one of the first glassmakers in America and practiced his craft in the part of Salem now known as Peabody, which was the first glass manufacturing district in America. Lawrence left the industry in 1642, and turned his attention to animal husbandry at which he was very successful.

== Persecution as Quakers ==
In 1657 the Southwicks were jailed for hosting two visiting Quaker preachers, John Copeland and Christopher Holder. Lawrence Southwick was found to be a member of the First Church of Salem and was released to be dealt with by the leaders of that church. Cassandra remained in jail for seven weeks and was fined forty shillings for possessing a paper written by their two visitors. The paper was considered heretical by Governor John Endicott and others.

In 1658 the couple and their son Josiah were jailed for 20 weeks for being Quakers.

In 1659 the two youngest of the Southwick's children, a daughter named Provided Southwick and a son named Daniel Southwick, were sentenced to be sold as slaves in Barbados for unpaid fines - fines related to their being Quakers. The sentence was not carried out and they went to Shelter Island, New York together.

In 1660 Lawrence and Cassandra died within three days of each other, on Shelter Island, due to privation, starvation and exposure.

== Royal Southwick ==
A plaque in Southwick Hall at University of Massachusetts Lowell commemorates "Royal Southwick, Lowell's anti-slavery Quaker senator and manufacturer and a descendant of Lawrence and Cassandra Southwick who were despoiled, imprisoned, starved, whipped, banished from Massachusetts Colony and persecuted to death in the year 1660 for being Quakers".

== See also ==
- "The Ballad of Cassandra Southwick " (1843), by John Greenleaf Whittier
