= Dorothy Waugh =

- Born: 1636; Hutton, England
- Died: 9 December 1666 (aged 29–30); Whitby, England

Dorothy Waugh (1636 – 9 December 1666) was an English Quaker preacher who was twice a missionary to North America. She wrote a rare account of the use of a Scold's bridle during one of her many imprisonments.

== Life ==
Waugh was born in Hutton in the Lake District in about 1636. She worked as a maid for the Quaker John Camm and that may have been where she decided to join the Friends. She became a preacher which involved a lot of travelling and imprisonment. One of her early visits must have been Kendal as she was under arrest there in 1653. In the following year she spent four months imprisoned in Norwich. In 1655 she was in Cornwall, Buckinghamshire and notably in Carlisle.The Carlisle courts heard that she was spreading the word on "ungodly practices" and the mayor was concerned that she might affect the town. Waugh could write and she published an account of her treatment in Carlisle which includes a rare account of a Scold's bridle being used.

The Quakers arrived in New England in 1656. Waugh travelled there on board the Speedwell; she was about twenty and about the same age as a fellow traveler Sarah Gibbons. They set out from Gravesend in Kent and they arrived in September. The other Quakers included William Brend, John Copeland, Christopher Holder, Mary Prince, Thomas Thrifton, Mary Weatherhead, and Sarah Gibbons. Their names were marked with a letter "Q" and they were arrested and interrogated. The colony kept them prisoners for eleven weeks as the magistrates were worried about their influence on the other colonists. They were banished from the colony.

In the following year Gibbons was among those who returned on the smaller ship Woodhouse. Five were set ashore at the Dutch plantation of what was then called New Amsterdam (New York); they were Robert Hodgson, Richard Doudney, Sarah Gibbons, Mary Weatherhead, and Dorothy Waugh.

After she returned from North America she was advocating celibacy within marriage so it is presumed that she married William Lotherington at about this time. By 1664 they are thought to have been living in Whitby where two of their children are thought to have been born. Waugh is believed to have died in Whitby on 9 December 1666 but no further details are known. Her husband outlived her probably dying in Whitby in 1674.
