= The Ballad of Cassandra Southwick (poem) =

Poem

"The Ballad of Cassandra Southwick" is a poem written by American Quaker poet John Greenleaf Whittier in 1843. It details the religious persecution of Cassandra Southwick's youngest daughter Provided Southwick, a Quaker woman who lived in Salem, Massachusetts and is the only white female known to be put up at auction as a slave in the United States.

== History ==
The Ballad of Cassandra Southwick

To the God of all sure mercies let my blessing rise today,
From the scoffer and the cruel He hath plucked the spoil away;
Yes, he who cooled the furnace around the faithful three,
And tamed the Chaldean lions, hath set His handmaid free!

Last night I saw the sunset melt though my prison bars,
Last night across my damp earth-floor fell the pale gleam of stars;
In the coldness and the darkness all through the long night-time,
My grated casement whitened with autumn's early rime.

Alone, in that dark sorrow, hour after hour crept by;
Star after star looked palely in and sank adown the sky;
No sound amid night's stillness, save that which seemed to be
The dull and heavy beating of the pulses of the sea;

All night I sat unsleeping, for I knew that on the morrow
The ruler said the cruel priest would mock me in my sorrow,
Dragged to their place of market, and bargained for and sold,
Like a lamb before the shambles, like a heifer from the fold!

Oh, the weakness of the flesh was there¯the shrinking and the shame;
And the low voice of the Tempter like whispers to me came,
'Why sit'st thou thus forlornly,' the wicked murmur said,
'Damp walls thy bower beauty, cold earth thy maiden bed?

'Where be the smiling faces, and voices soft and sweet,
Seen in thy father's dwelling, hoard in the pleasant street?
Where be the youths whose glances, the summer Sabbath through,
Turned tenderly and timidly unto thy father's pew?

'Why sit'st thou here, Cassandra? Bethink thee with what mirth
Thy happy schoolmates gather around the warm, dark hearth;
How the crimson shadows tremble on foreheads white and fair,
On eyes of merry girlhood, half hid in golden hair.

'Not for thee the hearth-fire brightens, not for thee kind words are spoken,
Not for thee the nuts of Wenham woods by laughing boys are broken;
No first-fruits of the orchard within thy lap are laid,
For thee no flowers of autumn the youthful hunters braid.

'O weak, deluded maiden!¯by crazy fancies led,
With wild and raving railers an evil path to tread;
To leave a wholesome worship, and teaching pure and sound,
And mate with maniac women, loose-haired and sackcloth-bound,

'And scoffers of the priesthood, who mock at things divine,
Who rail against thy pulpit, and holy bread and wine;
Sore from their cart-tail scourgings, and from the pillory lame,
Rejoicing in their wretchedness, and glorying in their shame.

'And what a fate awaits thee!¯a sadly toiling slave,
Dragging the slowly lengthening chain of bondage to the grave!
Think of thy woman's nature, subdued in hopeless thrall,
The easy prey of any, the scoff and scorn of all!'

Oh, ever as the Tempter spoke, and feecle Nature's fears
Wrung drop by drop the scalding flow of unavailing tears,
I wrestled down the evil thoughts, and strove in silent prayer
To feel, O Helper of the weak! that Thou indeed wert there!

I thought of Paul and Silas, within Philippi's cell,
And how from Peter's sleeping limbs the prison shackles fell,
Till I seemed to hear the trailing of an Angel's robe of white,
And to feel a blessed presence invisible to sight.

Bless the Lord for all his mercies! for the peace and love I felt,
Like the dew of Hermon's holy hill, upon my spirit melt;
When 'Get behind me, Satan!' was the language of my heart,
And I felt the Evil Tempter with all his doubts depart.

Slow broke the gray cold morning; again the sunshine fell,
Flocked with the shade of bar and grate within my lonely cell;
The hoar-frost melted on the wall, and upward from the street
Came careless laugh and idle word, and tread of passing feet.

At length the heavy bolts fell back, my door was open cast,
And slowly at the sheriff's side, up the long street I passed;
I heard the murmur round me, and felt, but dared not see,
How, from every door and window, the people gazed on me.

And doubt and fear fell on me, shame burned upon my cheek,
Swam earth and sky around me, my trembling limbs grew weak;
'Oh Lord, support thy handmaid, and from her soul cast out
The fear of men, which brings a snare, the weakness and the doubt.

Then the dreary shadows scattered, like a cloud in morning's breeze,
And a low deep voice within me seemed whispering words like these:
'Though thy earth be as the iron, and thy heaven a brazen wall,
Trust still His loving kindness whose power is over all.'

We paused at length, where at my feet the sunlit waters broke
On glaring reach of shining beach, and shingly wall of rock;
The merchant-ships lay idle there, in hard clear hues on high,
Tracing with rope and slender spar their network on the sky.

And there were ancient citizens, cloak-wrapped and grave and cold,
And grim and stout sea-captains with faces bronzed and old,
And on his horse, with Rawson, his cruel clerk at hand,
Sat dark and haughty Endicott, the ruler of the land.

And poisoning with his evil words the ruler's ready ear,
The priest leaned o'er his saddle, with laugh and scoff and jeer;
It stirred my soul, and from my lips the soul of silence broke,
As if through woman's weakness a warning spirit spoke.

I cried 'The Lord rebuke thee, thou smiter of the meek,
Thou robber of the righteous, thou trampler of the weak!
Go light the cold, dark hearth-stones,--go turn the prison lock
Of the poor hearts though hast hunted, thou wolf amid the flock!'

Dark lowered the brows of Endicott, and with a deeper red
O'er Rawson's wine-empurpled cheek the flash of anger spread;
'Good people,' quoth the white-lipped priest, 'heed not her words so wild,
Her Master speaks within her--the Devil owns his child!'

But gray heads shook, and young brows knit, the while the sheriff read
That law the wicked rulers against the poor have made,
Who to their house of Rimmon and idol priesthood bring
No bended knee of worship, nor gainful offering.

Then to the stout sea-captains the sheriff, turning, said;
'Which of ye, worthy seamen, will take this Quaker maid?
On the Isle of fair Barbadoes, or on Virginia's shore
You may hold her at a higher price than Indian girl or Moor!'

Grim and silent stood the captains; and when again he cried,
'Speak out my worthy seamen!' no voice, or sign replied;
But I felt a hard hand press my own, and kind words met my ear,¯
'God bless thee, and preserve thee, my gentle girl and dear!'

A weight seemed lifted from my heart, a pitying friend was nigh,
I felt it in his hard, rough hand, and saw it in his eye;
And when again the sheriff spoke, that voice, so kind to me,
Growled back its stormy answer like the roaring of the sea.

'Pile my ship with bars of silver, pack with coins of Spanish gold
From keel-piece up to deck-plank, the roomage of her hold,
By the living God that made me! I would sooner in your bay
Sink ship and crew and cargo, than bear this child away!'

'Well answered, worthy captain, shame on their cruel laws!'
Ran through the crowd in murmurs loud the people's just applause.
'Like the herdsmen of Tekoa, In Israel of old,
Shall we see the poor and righteous again for silver sold?'

I looked on haughty Endicott; with weapon half-way drawn,
Swept around the throng his lion glare of bitter hate and scorn;
Fiercely he drew his bridle-rein, and turned in silence back,
And sneering priest and baffled clerk rode murmuring in his track.

Hard after them the sheriff looked, in bitterness of soul,
Thrice smote his staff upon the ground, and crushed his parchment-roll.
'Good friends,' he said, 'since both have fled, the ruler and the priest
Judge ye, if from their further work I be not well released.'

Loud was the cheer which, full and clear, swept round the silent bay,
As, with kind words and kinder looks, he bade me go my way;
For He who turns the courses of the streamlet of the glen,
And the river of great waters, had turned the hearts of men.

Oh, at that hour the very earth seemed changed beneath my eye,
A holier wonder round me rose the blue walls of the sky,
A lovelier light on rock and hill and stream and woodland lay,
And softer lapsed on sunnier sands the waters of the bay.

Thanksgiving to the Lord of life! To him all praises be,
Who from the hands of evil men hath set his handmaid free;
All praise to Him before whose power the mighty are afraid,
Who take the crafty in the snare, which for the poor is laid!

Sing, O my soul, rejoicingly, on evening's twilight calm
Uplift the loud thanksgiving, pour forth the grateful psalm;
Let all dear hearts with me rejoice, as did the saints of old,
When of the Lord's good angel the rescued Peter told.

And weep and howl, ye evil priests and mighty men of wrong,
The lord shall smite the proud, and lay His hand upon the strong.
Wo to the wicked rulers in His avenging hour!
Wo to the wolves who seek the flocks to raven and devour;

But let the humble ones arise, the poor in heart be glad,
And let the mourning ones again with robes of praise be clad,
For He who cooled the furnace, and smoothed the stormy wave,
And tamed the Chaldean lions, is mighty still to save!

— John Greenleaf Whittier

The ballad's foundation is based on a remarkable event in the history of Puritan intolerance in early colonial America. In 1659, the youngest son and daughter of Lawrence and Cassandra Southwick, who themselves were imprisoned, deprived of all property and ultimately banished from Massachusetts Bay Colony, were fined £10 each for non-attendance at church, which they were unable to pay due to the severity of the family's legal and financial hardships. The case of Daniel and Provided Southwick was presented to the General Court at Boston, which issued an order signed by Edward Rawson empowering the treasurer of Essex County "to sell the said persons to any of the English nation at Virginia or Barbadoes [sic] to answer said fines." An attempt was made to sell Daniel and Provided at auction, but none of the shipmasters present were willing to take them to the West Indies.

== Characterizations ==
Whittier characterized Massachusetts Governor John Endecott as "dark and haughty" and exhibiting "bitter hate and scorn" for the Quakers. Secretary Rawson is characterized as Endecott's willing minion.
