= Sarah Gibbons =

Quaker preacher in America (1634/5–1659),

- Born: 1634/5 maybe Bristol
- Died: 1659; Providence

Sarah Gibbons (1634/5 – 1659) was an English Quaker preacher in America. She was one of the first to land and she was initially imprisoned and banished. She returned and died in an accident in 1659.

== Life ==
Gibbons was maybe born in Bristol in 1634 or 1635.

She was one of the women Quakers who were early travellors to America. The Quakers arrived in New England in 1656. Gibbons was on board the Speedwell, she was 21 and few details are known of her early life. They set out from Gravesend and they arrived in September. Her story was recovered by others as it is clear if she was literate. The other Quakers included William Brend, John Copeland, Christopher Holder, Mary Prince, Thomas Thrifton, Mary Weatherhead, and a maid (and preacher) named Dorothy Waugh. Their names were marked with a letter "Q" and were arrested, interrogated and the colony kept them prisoners for eleven weeks. The magistrates were worried about their influence on the other colonists and they were banished.

In the following year Gibbons was among those who returned on the smaller ship Woodhouse. Five were set ashore at the Dutch plantation of New Amsterdam (New York): Robert Hodgson, Richard Doudney, Sarah Gibbons, Mary Weatherhead, and Dorothy Waugh.

They established a Quaker group in Rhode Island. From there over the next two years she went to Manhattan, Salem, Boston and Barbados to evangelise.

Gibbons died in Providence in an accident with a canoe. She and others were using the canoe to come to shore, but the canoe leaked. Others were saved but Gibbons drowned.
