= William Dyer (settler) =

American politician (1609–?)

1st Attorney General of Rhode Island
- In office May 1650 – 1651
- Governor: Nicholas Easton
- Preceded by: Position established
- Succeeded by: John Cranston in 1654, following repeal of Coddington Commission

Personal details
- Born: baptized 19 September 1609 Kirkby Laythorpe, Lincolnshire, England
- Died: before 24 October 1677 Newport, Rhode Island
- Spouse: Mary Barrett
- Children: William Dyre, Samuel, stillborn daughter, Henry, William Dyre, Mahershallalhashbaz, Mary, Charles, Elizabeth
- Education: significant based on lifelong appointments as clerk and secretary
- Occupation: Milliner, Secretary, General Recorder, Attorney General, Commissioner, Deputy

William Dyer (also Dyre; 1609 – by 1677) was an early settler of the Colony of Rhode Island and Providence Plantations, a founding settler of both Portsmouth and Newport, and Rhode Island's first Attorney General. He is also notable for being the husband of the Quaker martyr Mary Dyer, who was executed for her Quaker activism. Sailing from England as a young man with his wife, Dyer first settled in Boston in the Massachusetts Bay Colony, but like many members of the Boston church, he became a supporter of the dissident ministers John Wheelwright and Anne Hutchinson during the Antinomian Controversy, and signed a petition in support of Wheelwright. For doing this, he was disenfranchised and disarmed, and with many other supporters of Hutchinson, he signed the Portsmouth Compact, and settled on Aquidneck Island in the Narragansett Bay. Within a year of arriving there, he and others followed William Coddington to the south end of the island, where they established the town of Newport.

Once in Newport, Dyer was very active in civil affairs, holding a number of offices, particularly those using his clerical skills such as clerk and secretary. The political alignment of the island towns of Portsmouth and Newport was in flux for the first decade of government there, and Coddington had gone to England to obtain a commission to keep the island independent with him as governor. By 1651, Dyer and others had greatly tired of Coddington's rule, and he was one of three men who went to England to have Coddington's commission revoked. Being successful, Dyer returned with the news in 1653, but his wife, Mary, who had been there at the same time, remained in England. Mary returned from England in 1657 after being there for five years, and had become a zealous Quaker convert. Banned from Massachusetts, she nevertheless defied the authorities and returned in 1659, being sentenced to hang, but getting a stay of execution while on the gallows. Her last trip to Boston in 1660 resulted in her execution and martyrdom.

Following Mary's death, Dyer remarried, and continued his public service, while having some legal entanglements with William Coddington. He was dead by late 1677, though no record for his death has been found.

== Early life ==
William Dyer was baptized at Kirkby Laythorpe, Lincolnshire, England, on 19 September 1609, the son of William Dyer. In 1625, while a teenager, he was apprenticed to Walter Blackborne, a fishmonger, and 16 years later, while he was in New England, he was taxed back in England as a member of the "Fishmonger's Company," though his profession before leaving there was that of a milliner. Dyer was married at Saint Martin-in-the-Fields in Westminster on 27 October 1633 to Mary Barrett (their oldest son Samuel named a son Barrett).

In 1635, Dyer and his wife sailed from England to New England. Mary was likely pregnant, or gave birth during the voyage, because on 20 December 1635, their son Samuel was baptized at the Boston church, the same month that the Dyers joined the church. Dyer became a freeman of Boston on 3 March the following year.

Once in Boston the Dyers became attracted to the preachings of the dissident ministers John Wheelwright and Anne Hutchinson during what is called the Antinomian Controversy, and in March 1637 Dyer signed a petition in support of Reverend Wheelwright, in it saying that "the court had condemned the truth of Christ." On 15 November, he was disenfranchised for signing this petition, and then on 20 November he and others were ordered to deliver up all guns, pistols, swords, powder and shot because the "opinions and revelations of Mr. Wheelwright and Mrs. Hutchinson have seduced and led into dangerous errors many of the people here in New England." In October 1637 Mary Dyer gave birth to a premature, stillborn and deformed child, which following the Dyer's departure from Massachusetts, Boston magistrate John Winthrop had exhumed. In March 1638 Winthrop wrote the following about the Dyers and the infant: "The wife of one William Dyer, a milliner in the New Exchange, a very proper and fair woman, and both of them notoriously infected with Mrs. Hutchinson's errors, and very censorious and troublesome (she being of a very proud spirit, and much addicted to revelations) had been delivered of a child some few months before...it had a face but no head..." Winthrop went on to describe the deformities, and add his own embellishments, and declared that this was divine reaction to the sinful errors of Hutchinson, Wheelwright, and their followers.

== Rhode Island ==
Scores of the followers of Wheelwright and Hutchinson were ordered out of the Massachusetts colony, but before leaving, a group of them, including Dyer, signed what is sometimes called the Portsmouth Compact, establishing a non-sectarian civil government upon the universal consent of the inhabitants, with a Christian focus. This document was penned by Dyer, he signing his name and then adding the title "clerk." Planning initially to settle in New Netherland, the group was persuaded by Roger Williams to purchase some land of the Indians on the Narragansett Bay. They settled on the north east end of Aquidneck Island, and established a settlement they called Pocasset, but in 1639 changed the name to Portsmouth. William Coddington was elected the first leader of the settlement, and given the Biblical title of Judge.

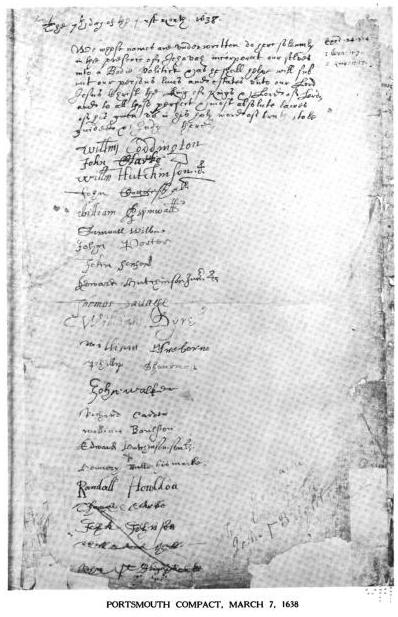
Portsmouth Compact; Dyer's name appears 11th on the list

A year after arriving in Portsmouth there was discord among the leadership of the settlement, and several of the leaders decided to go elsewhere. Dyer was one of nine men to sign an agreement on 28 April 1639 whereby a new plantation would be formed. The men and their families soon moved to the south end of Aquidneck Island, establishing the settlement of Newport, once again under the leadership of Coddington. Once established in Newport, Dyer and three others were tasked in June 1639 to proportion the new lands, and within the next year he was assigned 87 acres. In 1640 the two Aquidneck Island towns of Portsmouth and Newport united under a single government, and Dyer was the Secretary for them during the entire period that the island remained under its own authority, from 1640 to 1647.

Roger Williams, who envisioned a union of all four settlements on the Narragansett Bay, went to England to obtain a patent bringing all four towns under one government. Williams was successful in obtaining this document late in 1643, and it was brought from England and read to representatives of the four towns in 1644. Coddington was opposed to the Williams patent and managed to resist union with Providence until 1647 when representatives of the four towns ultimately met and adopted the Williams patent of 1643/4. With all of the Narragansett settlements now under one government, Dyer was elected the General Recorder for the entire colony in 1648.

Coddington was unhappy with the consolidated government, and wanted colonial independence for the two island towns, and decided to go to England to present his case to the Colonial Commissioners in London. In April 1651, the Council of State of England gave Coddington the commission of a separate government for the island of Aquidneck and for the smaller neighboring island of Conanicut (later Jamestown, Rhode Island), with him as governor. Henry Bull of Newport said that Coddington was welcomed upon his return from England, and that the majority of people accepted him as governor. From 1650 to 1653, most of which time was during the island's separation from Providence, Dyer served as the Attorney General.

For reasons that are not clear in existing records, criticism of Coddington arose as soon as he returned with his commission. The venerable Dr. John Clarke voiced his opposition to the island governor, and he and Dyer were sent to England as agents of the discontents to get the Coddington commission revoked. Simultaneously, the mainland towns of Providence and Warwick sent Roger Williams on a similar errand, and the three men sailed for England in November 1651. Mary Dyer had sailed to England just before the three men departed. Because of recent hostilities between the English and the Dutch, the men did not meet with the Council of State on New England until April 1652. Whether true or not, Coddington was accused of taking sides with the Dutch on matters of colonial trade, and in October 1652 his commission for the island government was revoked. Dyer was the messenger who returned to Rhode Island the following February, bringing the news of the return of the colony to the Williams' Patent of 1643, while his wife remained in England. The reunion of the colony was to take place that spring, but the mainland commissioners refused to come to the island to meet, and the separation of mainland from island was extended for another year. During this interim period, John Sanford was elected as governor of the island towns, while Gregory Dexter became president of the mainland towns.

In May 1653 Dyer received a commission from the General Assembly in preparation for military action against the Dutch. Captain John Underhill was selected as Commander in Chief upon the land, and Captain William Dyer became Commander in Chief upon the sea. The following year he had some harsh words for Coddington and Richard Tew, who he accused of making "encroachments upon the highway." In 1655 Dyer's name appears on a list of freemen from Newport.

== Execution of Mary Dyer ==
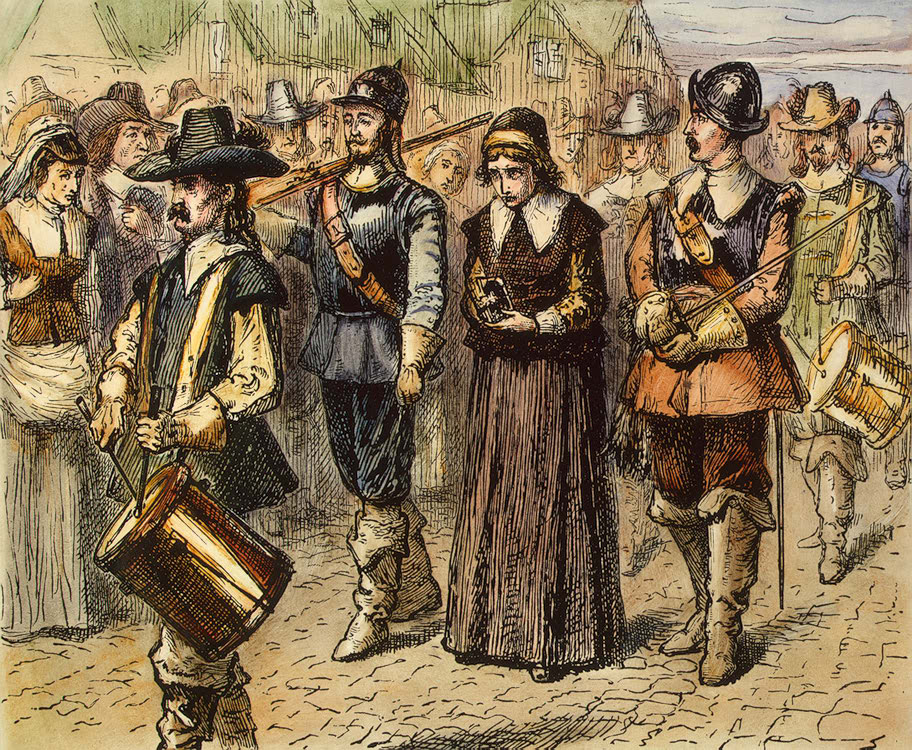
Mary Dyer being led to her execution

In 1657, Mary Dyer returned from England, after being away for five years. While there, she became a Quaker and a minister of that denomination, and upon disembarking at Boston she was jailed by the authorities for her beliefs and religious outpourings. Following the intercession of her husband, she was released, but Dyer was bound to not let her lodge in any town of the Massachusetts Bay Colony nor to speak to anyone during the journey home. Though banned from returning to Massachusetts under threat of death, Mary nevertheless went back to Boston in 1659 and was condemned to hang with two other Quakers. While she was on the scaffold with the noose around her neck, her execution was halted, and she was sent back to Rhode Island, after which she traveled to Long Island.

One more time Mary returned to Boston, and on the last day of May 1660 she was brought before Governor John Endecott, where she was questioned. Following her responses, she was ordered to be hanged the following day. On the gallows, she was encouraged to repent by Reverend John Wilson, her former pastor at the Boston church, and to not be so deluded by the devil. Following her execution, the Friends' records of Portsmouth noted her death: "Mary Dyer, the wife of William Dyer of Newport in Rhode Island: She was put to death at the town of Boston with the like cruel hand as the Martyrs were in Queen Mary's time..."

== Later life ==
Coat of Arms of William Dyer

Following his wife's death, William Dyer was remarried to a woman named Catherine by about 1664, and continued his public service. In 1661 he was a Newport Commissioner, in 1663 he was one of several prominent citizens named in the Rhode Island Royal Charter, from 1664 to 1666 he was a Deputy, from 1665 to 1668 he was the General Solicitor, and in 1669 he was secretary to the council. In 1670 he was involved in a number of deeds with his sons, which he used to settle the terms of his estate. No death date has been found for Dyer, but he was dead by 24 October 1677 when his widow sued the widow of his son, Samuel. Also, Governor Benedict Arnold's will, dated 24 December 1677, mentions William Dyer, Senior, now late deceased.

== Family ==
Six of the eight children of William and Mary Dyer grew to maturity and married. Their oldest surviving son, Samuel, married Ann Hutchinson, the daughter of Edward Hutchinson and Catharine Hamby, and the granddaughter of William and Anne Hutchinson. Another son, William Dyre was mayor of New York City. Dyer had one known child with his second wife.

== See also ==
- List of early settlers of Rhode Island
- Colony of Rhode Island and Providence Plantations
- Dyer Island (Rhode Island)
