= John Norton (divine) =

John Norton (May 6, 1606 – April 5, 1663) was a Puritan divine in England and Massachusetts.

== Career ==
Coat of Arms of John Norton

Norton was born at Bishop's Stortford, Hertfordshire, England on May 6, 1606. He was educated at Peterhouse, Cambridge (BA 1627), and ordained in his native town. He became a Puritan and sailed in 1634 to New England, landing at Plymouth, Massachusetts in 1635. He was 'called' to the new settlement of Ipswich, Massachusetts and ordained 'teacher' there in 1638.

He was an active member of the convention that formed The Cambridge Platform in 1648, and was a contributor to its drafting. In 1652 he became a colleague of John Wilson at the First Church in Boston, where he succeeded John Cotton as minister. In the following years, Norton became a leading opponent of the Antinomians and a chief instigator of the persecution of the Quakers in New England. However, he, along with Wilson, privately opposed the conviction and execution of Ann Hibbins for witchcraft. Mrs. Hibbins was hanged on June 19, 1656. She was the third person to be executed for witchcraft in Boston.

In 1662 he accompanied Governor Simon Bradstreet as agent of the Massachusetts Bay Colony to present an address to King Charles II after his Restoration, and to petition on behalf of New England. The king assured them that he would confirm the charter of the colony, but he required that justice should be administered in his name, and attached other conditions that the colonists regarded as arbitrary. Upon the return of the agents to Massachusetts, they were regarded with suspicion, and the report was circulated that they had sold the liberties of the country. This undermined Norton's popularity as a preacher, and it is supposed that it hastened his death. He died, aged 56, in Boston, Massachusetts on April 5, 1663.

He was renowned for his scholarship, a prolific author and polemicist. He wrote the first Latin book composed in the Colonies in 1645, which was published three years later in 1648, and his life of John Cotton was the first separately-issued biography to be published there in 1658.

== Writings ==
- Responsio ad totam quaestionum syllogen à clarissimo viro domino Guilielmo Apollonio, : ecclesiae middleburgensis pastore, propositam. : Ad componendas controversias quasdam circa politiam ecclesiasticam in Anglia nunc temporis agitatas spectantem. / Per Iohannem Nortonum ... Londini : typis R.B. impensis Andreae Crook ..., 1648. (The first book written in Latin in New England.)
- Responsio ad Guliel, 1648. (A Latin treatise on New England church governance.)
- A Discussion of that Great Point in Divinity, the Sufferings of Christ, 1653. (An attack on the perceived heresy of William Pynchon, who denied that Christ suffered the torment of Hell.)
- The Orthodox Evangelist, 1654. (Norton's most famous work is an important theological treatise endorsed by John Cotton, who had provided a prefatory epistle.)
- Abel Being Dead Yet Speaketh; or, The Life and Death of ... John Cotton, 1658. (The first separately-published biography in America.)
- The Heart of N-England Rent at the Blasphemies of the Present Generation, 1659. (Theological controversies opposing the Quakers and advocating the death penalty.
- Three Choice and Profitable Sermons Upon Severall Texts of Scripture, 1664. (The final, posthumously published, collection of Norton's religious writing, containing "Sion the Out-cast," "The Believer's Consolation," and "The Evangelical Worshipper".)
