= Cambridge Agreement =

The Cambridge Agreement was an agreement between the shareholders of the Massachusetts Bay Company, signed on August 29, 1629, in Cambridge, England.

Under its terms, those who intended to emigrate to the New World could purchase shares held by those shareholders who wanted to remain at home. Thus, the agreement was a precursor to the foundation of Boston, Massachusetts.

== Background ==
In 1620, the Charter of New England established the Council for New England as a Joint Stock Company.

== Impact of agreement ==
The Cambridge Agreement stipulated that the Massachusetts Bay Colony would be under local control in New England, rather than controlled by a corporate board based in London. Not all the Company's shareholders intended to emigrate, despite their Puritan sympathies. In return for guaranteeing local control over the colony, the non-emigrating shareholders were bought out by the emigrating shareholders. John Winthrop led the Company's emigrating party following these negotiations and was elected Colonial Governor in October 1629.

The agreement guaranteed that the Massachusetts Bay Colony would be self-governing and answerable only to the English Crown. The Colony and the Company then became, for all intents and purposes, the same. Winthrop's Puritans carried this Charter across the Atlantic, arriving in America in 1630.

12 Signatories:

- Richard Saltonstall
- Thomas Dudley
- William Vassall
- Nicholas West
- Isaac Johnson
- John Humphrey
- Thomas Sharp
- Increase Nowell
- John Winthrop
- William Pynchon
- Kellam Browne
- William Colburn
