= A Model of Christian Charity =

Sermon by Puritan leader John Winthrop

"A Modell of Christian Charitie"
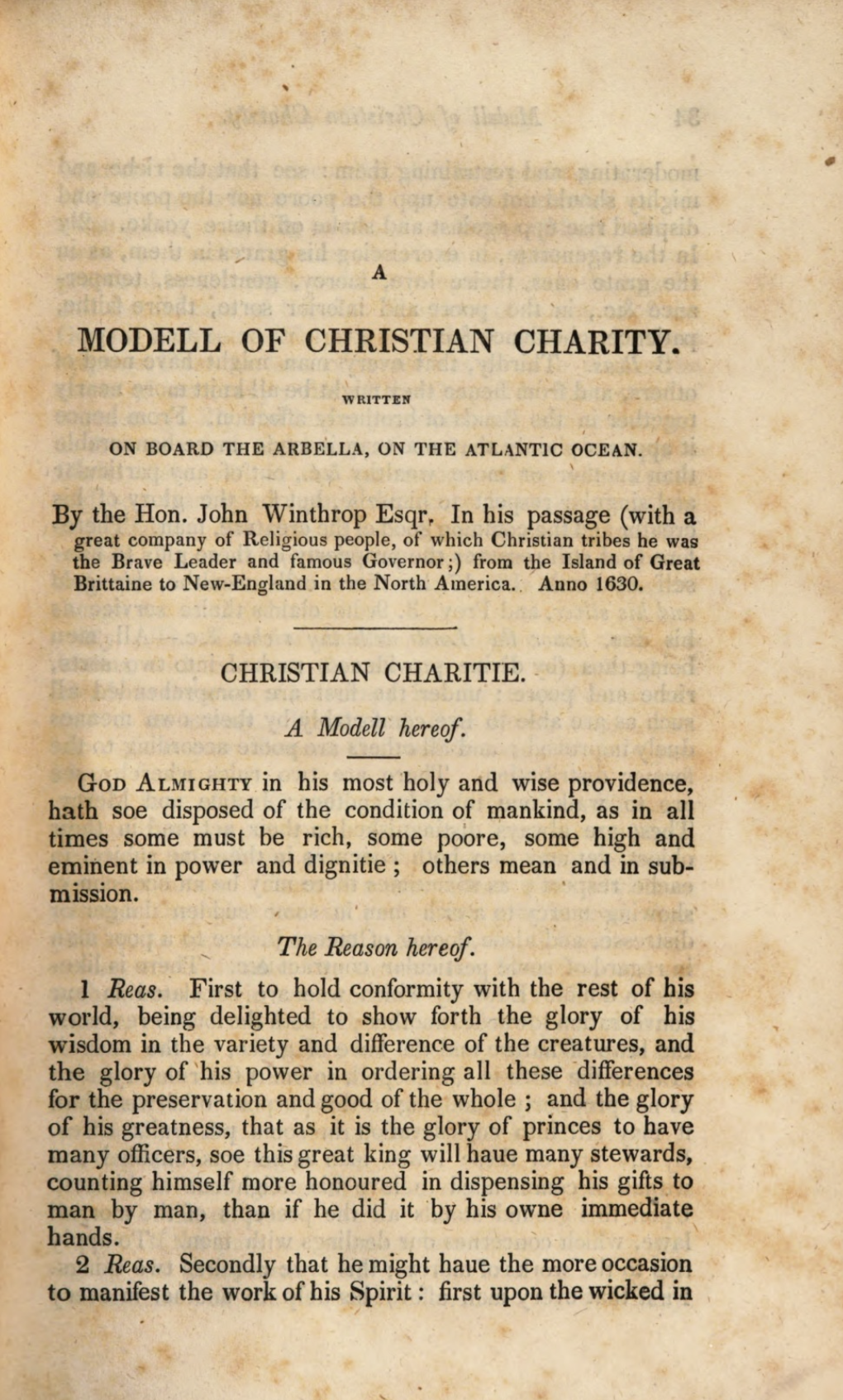
- "A Model of Christian Charity" printed in the Collections of the Massachusetts Historical Society, third series, vol. 7 (1838), page 34
- Date: 1630
- Also known as: "City upon a Hill"
- The full text of the speech at the Winthrop Family Papers, of the Massachusetts Historical Society

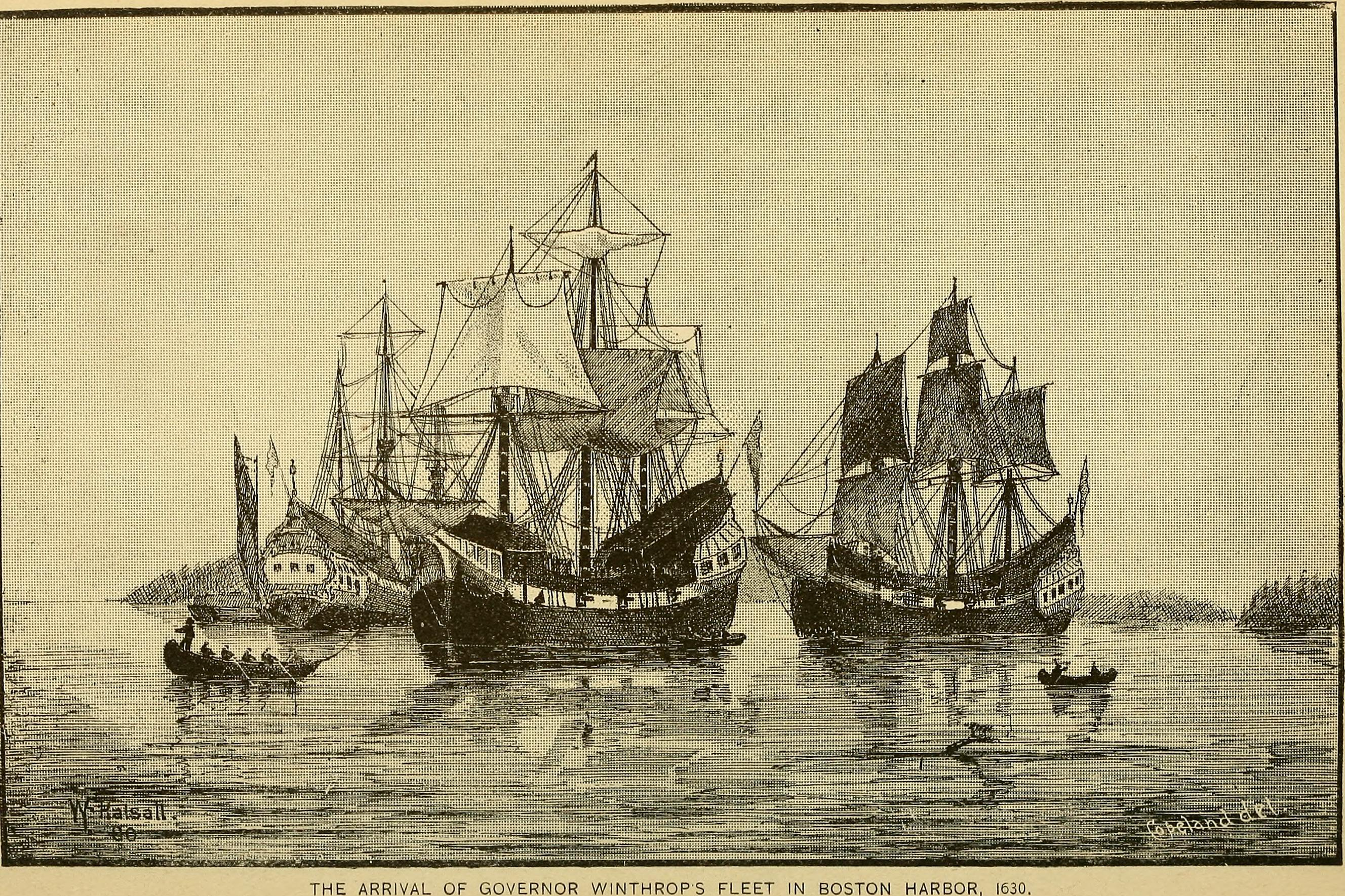
Arbella in the Winthrop Fleet

A Model of Christian Charity authored by John Winthrop

"A Model of Christian Charity" is a sermon of disputed authorship, historically attributed to Puritan leader John Winthrop and possibly written by John Wilson or George Phillips. It is also known as "City upon a Hill" and denotes the notion of American exceptionalism. The sermon was preserved by the New-York Historical Society, but it was not published until the 1830s.

== Provenance ==
Historically, "A Model of Christian Charity" has been attributed to Puritan leader John Winthrop. Francis Bayard Winthrop donated a manuscript titled "A Modell of Christian Charity" to the New-York Historical Society in 1809. According to a headnote written by Bayard Winthrop, the text was written "[o]n Boarde the Arrabella", "On the Attlantick ! Ocean!", and "[b]y the Honrble John Winthrop. Esqr." However, the text includes a note from its scrivener describing the sermon as having been given "heere in England", rather than aboard the Arbella at sea.

Textual scholar Jerome McGann reports that "all of the pertinent contextual evidence" corroborates the sermon as having been given in England and not aboard the Arbella. McGann concludes that "perhaps Governor Winthrop did not write the work. He was a lawyer and an administrator, not a minister, and no lay sermons by Winthrop are extant". McGann hypothesizes that John Wilson or George Phillips, two ministers who sailed with the Arbella, may have authored the sermon. Literary scholar Abram Van Engen states it "is plausible" that Phillips wrote the sermon and calls "McGann's evidence compelling". Historian Matthew Rowley writes that there "is considerable debate about when, where, and if Winthrop publicly delivered this famous discourse, and even if he was the author". Michael Ditmore, a professor of English, summarizes, "its authorship is now disputed".

== Summary ==
The sermon begins, "God Almighty in his most holy and wise providence, hath so disposed of the condition of mankind, as in all times some must be rich, some poor, some high and eminent in power and dignity; others mean and in subjection." The speaker then states three reasons why God made people have different positions from one another:

- To show conformity with the differences in the natural world. He explains how God wants to give gifts to mankind by distributing them through mankind, "dispensing his gifts to man by man". Winthrop's view was that mankind was called upon to act as God's stewards, distributing God's gifts to others: "as it is the glory of princes to have many officers, so this great king will have many stewards".
- To show the world the role played by the Spirit in the lives of mankind: 1) restraining evil, "so that the rich and mighty should not eat up the poor" and the downtrodden should not rise up against their oppressors; 2) showing God's grace to mankind through the lives of Christians ("the regenerate"), both "love, mercy, gentleness" in those who are wealthy and "faith, patience, obedience" in those who are poor.
- To foster an inter-dependence among mankind, that "every man might have need of others, and from hence they might be all knit more nearly together in the bonds of brotherly affection". He explains that the rich are permitted wealth, not for their own benefit, but "for the glory of his Creator and the common good of the creature, Man." God permits one man to be wealthy so that the wealthy man may share his riches with the poor man, benefitting both.

The sermon then explains that there are two overriding "rules" which should govern all interactions within a community, "two rules whereby we are to walk one towards another: Justice and Mercy." He argues that justice and mercy should be exercised by both rich and poor, since both rich and poor have need of them. He summarizes these two rules with an overriding "law", that mankind "is commanded to love his neighbor as himself". He acknowledges that a person is responsible to make provision for one's family and also for the future, but the overriding principle is: "if thou lovest God thou must help [thy brother]."

So is it in all the labor of love among Christians. The party loving, reaps love again.

Winthrop believes that having this "bond of love" for one another would unite the group as they travel to America "to seek out a place of cohabitation and consortship under a due form of government both civil and ecclesiastical"—that is, as they work together to establish a new society based upon this bond of love. To accomplish this, he calls upon his listeners:

...we must love brotherly without dissimulation; we must love one another with a pure heart fervently. We must bear one another’s burdens. We must not look only on our own things, but also on the things of our brethren.

However, he then adjures his listeners: "We are entered into covenant with Him for this work [of establishing a new colony]. We have taken out a commission." He warns them that "the Lord will surely break out in wrath against us" if they fail to fulfill that commission by putting the interests of others and of the colony above their own interests:

...if we shall neglect the observation of these articles which are the ends we have propounded, and ... shall fall to embrace this present world and prosecute our carnal intentions, seeking great things for ourselves and our posterity, the Lord will surely break out in wrath against us, and be revenged of such a people, and make us know the price of the breach of such a covenant.

Winthrop calls upon his listeners to commit themselves to brotherly love and unity, setting the needs of others and of the community above one's own needs.

Now the only way to avoid this shipwreck, and to provide for our posterity, is to follow the counsel of Micah, to do justly, to love mercy, to walk humbly with our God. For this end, we must be knit together, in this work, as one man. We must entertain each other in brotherly affection.

If the people can commit together to these things, Winthrop concludes, then they can indeed establish a new community that will become a role model for others to follow.

We shall find that the God of Israel is among us, when ten of us shall be able to resist a thousand of our enemies; when He shall make us a praise and glory that men shall say of succeeding plantations, "may the Lord make it like that of New England." For we must consider that we shall be as a city upon a hill. The eyes of all people are upon us. So that if we shall deal falsely with our God in this work we have undertaken, and so cause Him to withdraw His present help from us, we shall be made a story and a by-word through the world.

== Structure of sermon ==
Text: The structure of this sermon is directed toward the Puritans so that they can understand the overall message of serving God as a community.

Doctrine: Laying a foundation of principles drawn from scripture, on which the reasoning is built.

Reason: Puritan listeners are familiar with the question and answer technique used throughout the sermon. This technique enables them to understand and interpret the meaning of the scriptures, and gives an explanation of the sermon's purpose.

Application: Applying the sermon to the Puritans' personal lives and to the "divine world" mentioned in his text, meaning the community which they are going to build in America.

== Themes ==
- Exceptionalism: The sermon explains how God chose the few people on the boats to go to America in order to carry out their mission and also mentions how the rest of the world will watch them.
- Charity: Giving to others who need help—not only the poor, but also the community.
- Communalism: Communalism, according to the sermon, reflects the Puritan ideals of “love, unity, and charity.” He mentions that people have different things to offer each other, and this induces a need for each other, helping the community.
- Unity: Different types of people were on the ship during the sermon but had the same goal of serving God. This was also represented with people being different parts of one body. Through his use of language connected to women's work, such as "knit", Winthrop suggests the importance of women in holding the community together.

== Impact ==
“A Model of Christian Charity” conveys the optimistic, confident, community-focused mindset in which the New England colonies were founded. Perry Miller, a historian considered one of the founders of American Studies, writes that the sermon “stands at the beginning of [the] consciousness” of the American mind. Several figures in U.S. politics—beginning as early as John Adams—have referenced this text in public speeches when conveying themes of unity and idealism, most often citing the symbol of “a city upon a hill.”

In his 1980 election eve speech, Ronald Reagan asserted his belief that “Americans...are every bit as committed to that vision of a shining city on a hill, as were those long ago settlers.” More recently, public figures have utilized the sermon to argue how far the United States has strayed from its values. In his critique of presidential candidate Donald Trump, 2012 Republican presidential nominee Mitt Romney posited that “[Trump’s] personal qualities would mean that America would cease to be a shining city on a hill.”
