= Theophilus Clinton, 4th Earl of Lincoln =

Theophilus Clinton
- 4th Earl of Lincoln
- Tenure: 1619–1667
- Known for: Puritan opponent of Charles I
- Born: 1599
- Died: 21 May 1667 (aged 67–68)

Theophilus Clinton, 4th Earl of Lincoln, KB (1599 – 21 May 1667), styled Lord Clinton until 1619, was an opponent of Charles I during and preceding the English Civil War.

== Family ==
Clinton arms: Argent, six cross-crosslets fitchées sable three two and one on a chief azure two mullets or pierced gules

The eldest son of the 3rd Earl of Lincoln and Elizabeth Knyvet, one of the three daughters of Henry Knyvet — whose brother had become the 1st Baron Knyvet following the Gunpowder Plot. Lord Clinton studied at Emmanuel College, Cambridge.

He was appointed a Knight of the Bath at the investiture of Charles, Duke of York as Prince of Wales at Whitehall on 3 November 1616. After succeeding to the family titles upon the death of his father in 1619, he married firstly, in 1622, the Hon Bridget Fiennes, only daughter of William Fiennes, 7th Baron Saye and Sele (later 1st Viscount); the Earl and Countess of Lincoln had:

- Edward Clinton, Baron Clinton (1624–1657), married 1644 Lady Anne Holles (died London, October 1707), eldest daughter of the 2nd Earl of Clare, and had:
  - Edward Clinton, 5th Earl of Lincoln (1645–1692), KB 1661, de uxoris seigneur de Lavérune, married 1674 Jeanne de Gallières (died Languedoc, 1688).
- Lady Catherine Clinton (died 1643), married 1639, as his first wife, George Booth, 1st Baron Delamer, leaving a daughter: The Hon. Vere Booth.
- Lady Arabella Clinton (died 1667), married 1643 Robert Rolle, MP, High Sheriff of Devon, from whom descend the present Barons Clinton
- Lady Margaret Clinton (died 1688), married 1651 Colonel Hugh Boscawen, PC, JP, MP, whose grandson, Hugh Fortescue, 14th Baron Clinton, became Earl Clinton in 1746.

Lord Lincoln married secondly Elizabeth Gorges (died 1675). On his death in 1667, the family titles devolved upon his grandson.

== Opposition to Charles I ==
Lord Lincoln was a puritan and has been described as a powerful friend of the puritans of Lincolnshire. He was the son-in-law of William Fiennes, 1st Viscount Saye and Sele and shared his father in law's opposition to the King. He was an opponent of Charles I's forced loan and circulated a pamphlet which accused the King of attempting to overthrow parliament. He was imprisoned in the Tower of London for his opposition while others within the Household escaped to Massachusetts and other colonies.

He refused to take the covenant and was excluded from the House of Lords. Other household members from Lincoln, specifically John Holland and Robert Blow, escaped to Massachusetts and settled in the Dorchester area.

== Colonisation of North America ==
Lord Lincoln also shared his father-in-law's enthusiasm for colonising North America. He employed Thomas Dudley, who went on to become the second governor of Massachusetts, as the steward of the family estate in Sempringham, Lincolnshire. Sempringham was the location of a meeting in 1629 where John Winthrop and others discussed the organisation of a proposed Massachusetts Bay Colony. His brother-in-law, the Hon. Charles Fiennes, and his sister, Lady Arbella Johnson, wife of Rev Isaac Johnson sailed to America with the Winthrop Fleet.

== Notes ==
Peerage of England
Preceded by Thomas Clinton	Earl of Lincoln; 1619–1667	Succeeded by Edward Clinton
