= Arbella =

Ship in Winthrop Fleet

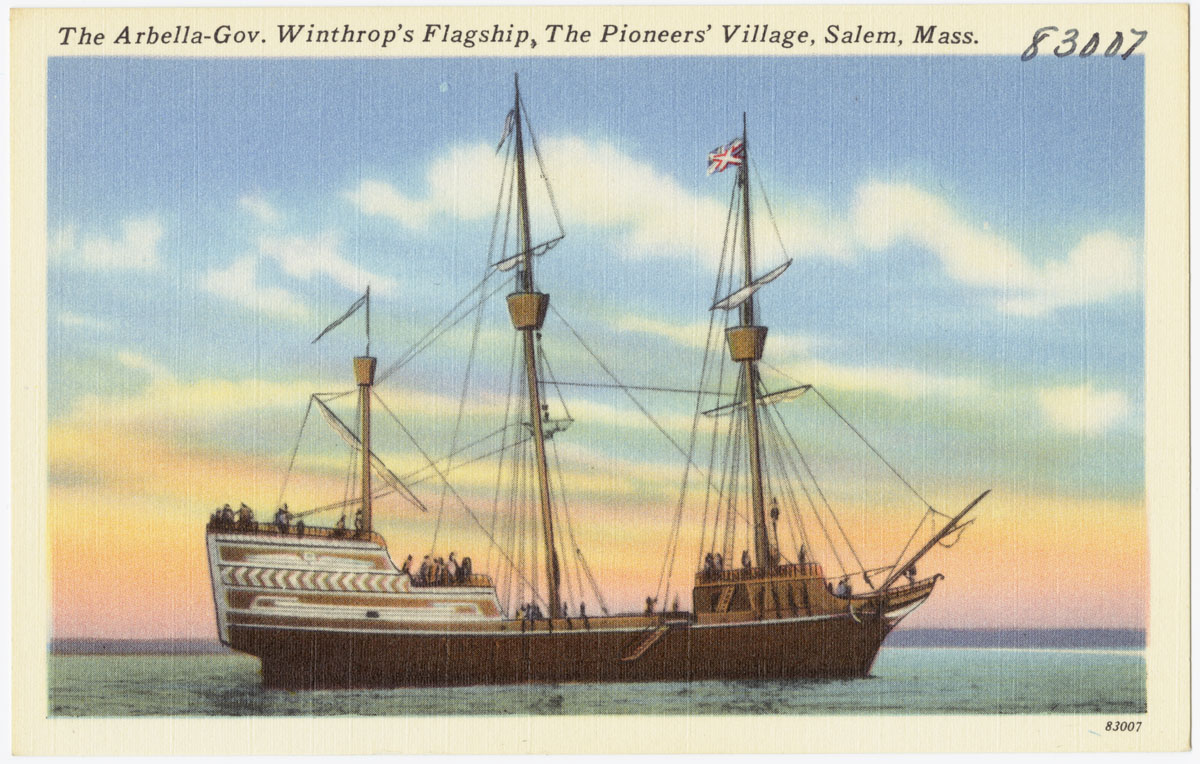
- This replica of Arbella was built for the 300th anniversary of Salem in 1930 in conjunction with Pioneer Village. It fell into disrepair and was dismantled in 1954.

History
- Name: Arbella, Arabella

Arbella or Arabella was the flagship of the Winthrop Fleet on which Governor John Winthrop, other members of the Company (including William Gager), and Puritan emigrants transported themselves and the Charter of the Massachusetts Bay Company from England to Salem between April 8 and June 12, 1630, thereby giving legal birth to the Commonwealth of Massachusetts. John Winthrop is reputed to have given the famous "A Model of Christian Charity" sermon aboard the ship. Also on board was Anne Bradstreet, the first European female poet to be published from the New World, and her family.

The ship was originally called Eagle, but her name was changed in honor of Lady Arbella Johnson, a member of Winthrop's company, as was her husband Isaac. Lady Arbella was the daughter of Thomas Clinton, 3rd Earl of Lincoln.

== Notable passengers ==
- Captain John Underhill, militia leader, author of an account of the Pequot War
- Sir Richard Saltonstall, first settler of Watertown, Massachusetts, one of the founders of Connecticut Colony, later English ambassador to Holland
- Thomas Dudley, who served several terms as Governor of the Massachusetts Bay Colony
- Anne Bradstreet, poet
- John Winthrop the Younger, son of the leader of the fleet, John Winthrop; first Governor of the Saybrook Colony and Connecticut Colony
- Rev. George Phillips, religious leader and one of the founders of Watertown
- Rev. John Wilson, founder of the first church in Boston. He delivered the statement of banishment from the Massachusetts Bay Colony to Anne Hutchinson.
- Increase Noel, was the first treasurer for the Massachusetts Bay colony. He was born in West England about 1600 and died in 1655.
- Sir Robert Parke (English Baronet), Secretary to John Winthrop, Deputy to General Court and Selectman, served in the Colonial Forces. He died in 1664 in Mystic, Connecticut, at age 83.
- Deacon Edward Converse and wife Sarah Converse, he served as a Charlestown Selectman from 1635 to 1640, a Deputy to the General Court, one of the first two Deacons of the church in Woburn and was a founding father of Woburn, Massachusetts Bay Colony.
- William Chesebrough (1595–1667) Founder & Prominent Citizen of Stonington, CT, Farmer, Politician, & Prominent member of Greater Boston Society

== Legacy ==
At the 1986 re-dedication of the Statue of Liberty, Ronald Reagan referenced the Arbella as a part of the historical "common threads" that tied Americans together. He misidentified the passengers of the ship as Quakers rather than Puritans.
