= Thomas Dacre =

Thomas Dacre may refer to:

- Thomas Dacre, 2nd Baron Dacre (1467–1525), English nobleman
- Thomas Dacre, 4th Baron Dacre (c. 1527–1566), English Member of Parliament and peer
- Thomas Dacre, 6th Baron Dacre (1387–1458), English nobleman
- Tom Dacre, a character in the poem "The Chimney Sweeper"

== See also ==
- Thomas Dacres (1587–1668), English politician
- Thomas Dacres (younger) (1609–1668)
