= Winthrop Fleet =

1630 Puritan naval trip to New England

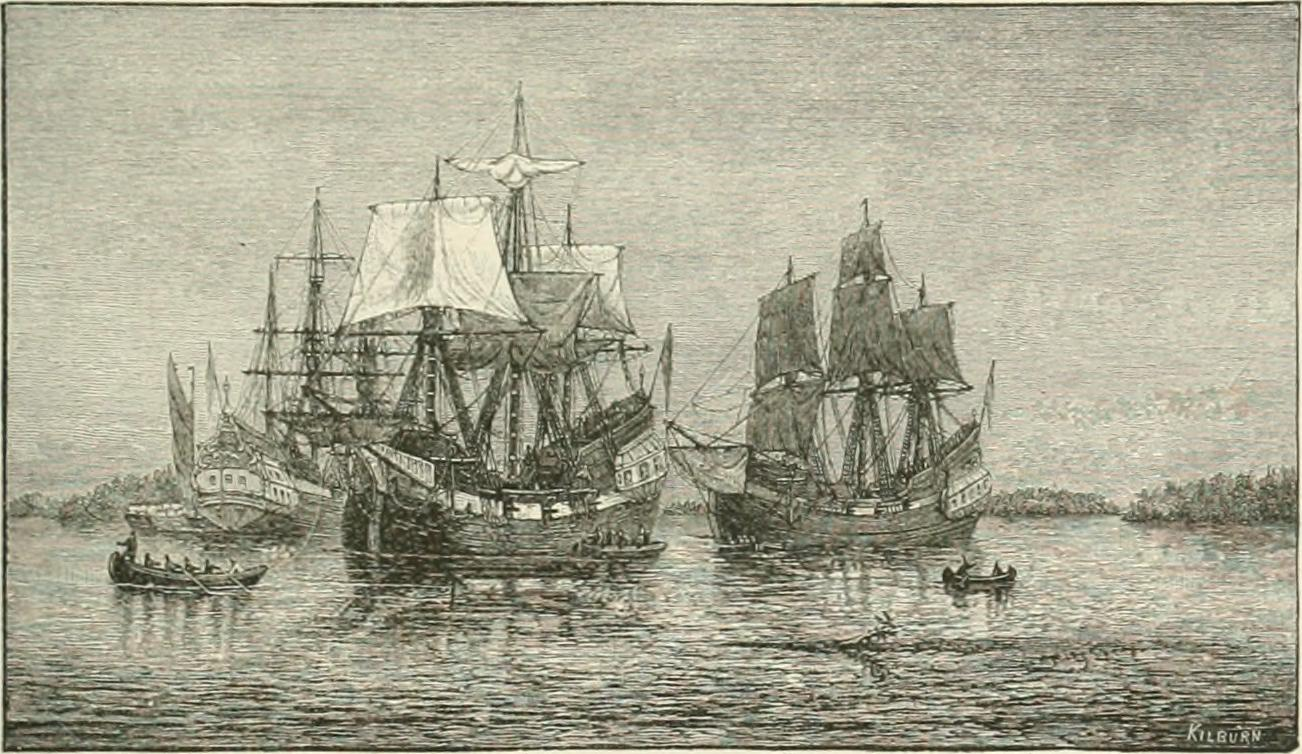
Arrival of the Winthrop Colony, by William Halsall

The Winthrop Fleet was a group of 11 ships led by John Winthrop out of a total of 17 funded by the Massachusetts Bay Company which together carried between 700 and 1,000 Puritans plus livestock and provisions from England to New England over the summer of 1630, during the first period of the Great Migration.

== Motivation ==
The Puritan population in England had been growing for several years leading up to this time. They disagreed with the practices of the Church of England, whose rituals they viewed as superstitions. An associated political movement attempted to modify religious practice in England to conform to their views, and King James I wished to suppress this growing movement. Nevertheless, the Puritans eventually gained a majority in Parliament. James' son Charles came into direct conflict with Parliament, and viewed them as a threat to his authority. He temporarily dissolved Parliament in 1626, and again the next year, before dissolving it permanently in March 1629. The King's imposition of Personal Rule gave many Puritans a sense of hopelessness regarding their future in that country, and many prepared to leave it permanently for life in New England, and a wealthy group of leaders obtained a royal charter in March 1629 for the Massachusetts Bay Colony.

A fleet of five ships had departed a month previously for New England that included approximately 300 colonists led by Francis Higginson. However, the colony leaders and the bulk of the colonists remained in England for the time being to plan more thoroughly for the success of the new colony. In October 1629, the group who remained in England elected John Winthrop to be Governor of the Fleet and the Colony. Over the ensuing winter, the leaders recruited a large group of Puritan families, representing all manner of skilled labor to ensure a robust colony.

== Voyage ==
The initial group (Arbella and her three escorts) departed Yarmouth, Isle of Wight on April 8, the remainder following in two or three weeks. Seven hundred men, women, and children were distributed among the ships of the fleet. The voyage was rather uneventful, the direction and speed of the wind being the main topic in Winthrop's journal, as it affected how much progress was made each day. There were a few days of severe weather, and every day was cold. The children were cold and bored, and there is a description of a game played with a rope that helped with both problems. Many were sick during the voyage.

The Winthrop Fleet was a well-planned and financed expedition that formed the nucleus of the Massachusetts Bay Colony. They were not the first settlers of the area; there was an existing settlement at Salem, started in about 1626 and populated by a few hundred Puritans governed by John Endicott, who had arrived in 1629 and seized control from Roger Conant. Winthrop superseded Endicott as Governor of the Colony upon his arrival in 1630. (Note: The Plymouth Colony preceded both Winthrop and Endicott, but they maintained their own system of government and did not fall under the charter of the Massachusetts Bay Colony at this time.) The flow of Puritans to New England continued for another ten years, during a period known as the Great Migration.

== Ships ==
Winthrop's journal lists the 11 ships in his fleet:

- Arbella: The flagship, designated "Admiral" in the consortship; named for Lady Arbella, wife of Isaac Johnson (see below)
- Talbot: Designated "Vice Admiral"; Henry Winthrop sailed on this ship, John Winthrop's son and first husband of Elizabeth Fones
- Ambrose: Designated "Rear Admiral"
- Jewel: Designated "Captain"
- Mayflower (not the Mayflower of the Pilgrims)
- Whale
- Success
- Charles
- William and Francis
- Hopewell
- Trial

Six other ships arrived at Massachusetts Bay in 1630 for a total of seventeen that year.

== Notable passengers ==
Nine leading men applied for the charter for the Massachusetts Bay Colony and came to New England in Winthrop's Fleet.

- John Winthrop, Governor, and his sons Henry Winthrop and two minors
- Sir Richard Saltonstall, three sons, and two daughters
- Isaac Johnson and his wife Lady Arbella, daughter of Thomas Clinton, 3rd Earl of Lincoln
- Rev. George Phillips, co-founder of Watertown
- Charles Fiennes
- Thomas Dudley, his wife, two sons, and four daughters
- William Coddington, a Governor of Rhode Island Colony and his wife
- William Pynchon and his wife and three daughters
- William Vassall, for whom Vassalboro, Maine was named, and his wife
- John Revell, merchant, who lent money to the Plymouth Colony, and who was chosen assistant to the Massachusetts Bay Colony
- Captain Thomas Wiggin, the first Governor of the Province of New Hampshire

Ezekiel Richardson, Edward Convers and Mousall were some of the original founders of Woburn ( from Charlestown). Other passengers of historical significance include:

- Stephen Bachiler, founder of Hampton, New Hampshire
- Simon Bradstreet and his wife Anne Bradstreet
- Jehu Burr, ancestor of Aaron Burr
- Samuel Cole, purveyor of the first tavern in the new world
- Edward Convers
- Christopher Hussey, early settler of Hampton, New Hampshire and Nantucket, Massachusetts
- Thomas Mayhew
- Allan Perley
- Robert Seeley
- Isaac Stearns
- John Taylor
- Captain John Underhill
- John Wilson, first minister of the First Church of Boston
- Captain Edward Johnson, a leading figure in colonial Massachusetts and one of the founders of Woburn, Massachusetts
- William Hawthorne, Ancestor of Author Nathaniel Hawthorne
- William Chesebrough (1595-1667) Founder & Prominent Citizen of Stonington, CT, Farmer, Politician, & Prominent member of Greater Boston Society

A complete list of passengers is maintained by The Winthrop Society, a hereditary organization of descendants of the Winthrop Fleet and later Great Migration ships that arrived before 1634.

The definitive work on the Winthrop migration, its roots, structure, ships, and passengers is often considered Robert Charles Anderson's The Winthrop Fleet: Massachusetts Bay Company Immigrants to New England, 1629–1630.
