= Thomas Clinton, 3rd Earl of Lincoln =

English peer (1568–1619)

Thomas Clinton, 3rd Earl of Lincoln (1568 – 15 January 1619), was an English peer, styled Lord Clinton from 1585 to 1616.

== Life ==
Educated at Oxford (MA 1588), Clinton represented the constituencies of Lincolnshire in 1601 and Great Grimsby from 1604 to 1610. Lord Clinton was a member of the Lower House, serving as an English representative in the Anglo-Scottish Union Commission established in June 1604, before entering the House of Lords on 14 February 1610 by writ of acceleration as Baron Clinton.

== Family ==
The eldest son of Henry Clinton, 2nd Earl of Lincoln, KB and Lady Catherine Hastings, daughter of the 2nd Earl of Huntingdon and Hon Catherine Pole, he succeeded his father in 1616 to the family titles.

Clinton married 1584 Elizabeth Knyvett (died 1632), younger daughter and co-heiress of Sir Henry Knyvett, MP, and had:

- Theophilus Clinton, 4th Earl of Lincoln, 12th Baron Clinton (1599 – London, 21 May 1667), married first (by 1619) the Hon. Bridget Fiennes, and married secondly Elizabeth Gorges (died 1675), having (by his first wife):
  - Edward Clinton, Baron Clinton (1624 – London, 1657), married by 1652 Lady Anne Holles (died London, October 1707), and had:
    - Edward Clinton, 5th Earl of Lincoln, 13th Baron Clinton (1645 – France, 25 November 1692), married in 1674 Jeanne de Gallières (died 25 August 1688), without issue; upon the death of the 5th Earl, the barony of Clinton (created by writ of summons) fell into abeyance between his aunts and their issue
  - Lady Katherine Clinton (died 1643), married 1639, as his first wife, George Booth, 1st Baron Delamer (died 1684), leaving an only daughter, who died without issue.
  - Lady Arabella Clinton (died 1667), married 1643 Robert Rolle, MP, High Sheriff of Devon (died 1660), leaving a daughter (Bridget Trefusis) and a son (Colonel Samuel Rolle)
  - Lady Margaret Clinton (died 1688), married 1651 Colonel Rt Hon Hugh Boscawen, JP, MP (died 1701), leaving a daughter (Bridget Fortescue)
- Henry Clinton -1595
- Thomas Clinton - 1596
- Lady Arbella Clinton - 1597 (died Salem, Essex County, Massachusetts, August 1630), married Isaac Johnson
- Lady Susan Clinton, married Sergeant-Major-General John Humphrey; they emigrated to America; returning to England 26 October 1641.
- Edward Clinton- 1600
- Lady Frances Clinton, married John Gorges, Lord Proprietor of the Province of Maine
- Lady Dorcas Clinton - 1614
- Lady Sara Clinton - 1615.
- Ann Clinton - 1602
- Charles Clinton -1604
- Knyvett Clinton - 1605

Lord Lincoln died at Tattershall.

Peerage of England
Preceded by Henry Clinton	Earl of Lincoln; 1616–1619	Succeeded by Theophilus Clinton
Preceded by Henry Clinton	Baron Clinton (writ of acceleration); 1610–1619	Succeeded by Theophilus Clinton
