= Elizabeth Clinton =

Elizabeth Clinton may refer to:

- Elizabeth Blount, married name Elizabeth Clinton, mistress of Henry VIII, first wife of Edward Clinton, 1st Earl of Lincoln
- Elizabeth FitzGerald, Countess of Lincoln (1527–1589), a.k.a. The Fair Geraldine, Irish noblewoman; 3rd wife of Edward Clinton, 1st Earl of Lincoln
- Elizabeth Clinton, Countess of Lincoln (c. 1570–1638), formerly Elizabeth Knyvet, wife of Thomas Clinton, 3rd Earl of Lincoln
