= Elizabeth Clinton, Countess of Lincoln =

English noblewoman and breast-feeding advocate

Elizabeth Clinton, Countess of Lincoln (née Knyvet; c. 1570–1638) was an English noblewoman and writer. She was Countess of Lincoln from 1616 until the death of her husband Thomas Clinton, 3rd Earl of Lincoln, in 1619, then Dowager Countess. Her pamphlet on child-raising, The Countess of Lincoln's Nursery, gained praise.

== Family background ==
Elizabeth was the younger daughter and co-heiress of Sir Henry Knyvet MP of Charlton Park, Wiltshire, and his first wife, Elizabeth Stumpe. Her maternal grandfather was a merchant, Sir James Stumpe.

== Children ==
Elizabeth married the future earl on 21 September 1584. They had 18 children, including:

- Theophilus Clinton, 4th Earl of Lincoln, 12th Baron Clinton (1599–1667, married twice, but had children only by his first wife, the Hon. Bridget Fiennes.
- Henry Clinton (born 1595)
- Thomas Clinton (born 1596)
- Lady Arbella Clinton (1597–1630), who married Isaac Johnson
- Lady Susan Clinton, who married Sergeant-Major-General John Humphrey; they emigrated to America and returned to England in 1641.
- Edward Clinton (born 1600)
- Lady Frances Clinton, who married John Gorges, Lord Proprietor of the Province of Maine
- Ann Clinton – baptized 3 March 1602
- Charles Clinton (born 1604)
- Knyvett Clinton (born 1605)
- John Clinton
- Lady Dorcas Clinton (born 1614)
- Lady Sara Clinton (born 1615)

== Book of advice ==
In 1622, Elizabeth Clinton wrote an advisory pamphlet dedicated to her daughter-in-law, Bridget, entitled The Countess of Lincoln's Nursery. It drew on earlier works on child-rearing by Elizabeth Jocelin and Dorothy Leigh, and the dowager's own experience as a mother. She praised the young countess for deciding to breast-feed her own children, something which Elizabeth regretted that she had not done.

The physician and author Thomas Lodge wrote a preface to the countess's book. He praised it for its conciseness and for tackling an issue little addressed hitherto. Thomas Goad, who edited the 1632 printing, called Elizabeth Clinton "a deputed mother for instruction".
