= Margaret Jones (Puritan midwife) =

17th-century Massachusetts Bay colonist executed for witchcraft

Margaret Jones (1613 – June 15, 1648) was the first person to be executed for witchcraft in Massachusetts Bay Colony, and the second in New England (the first being Alse Young in 1647) during a witch-hunt that lasted from 1647 to 1693. Hundreds of people throughout New England were accused of practicing witchcraft during that period, including over two hundred in 1692 during the Salem Witch Trials. Prior to the Salem Witch Trials of 1692, over a forty-one year period (1647–1688), nine women, including Margaret Jones, were hanged as witches.

Jones, who resided in Charlestown, now a section of Boston, was a midwife and practiced medicine. Some of what caused her to be accused of witchcraft had to do with these practices. There are only two primary sources of information on Jones' plight: Governor John Winthrop's journal and the observations of minister John Hale, who, as a 12-year-old boy, had witnessed Jones' execution.

== Trial and conviction ==
John Winthrop, as governor, and several other founders of the Massachusetts Bay Colony were among the members of the General Court which tried and convicted Margaret Jones for witchcraft. The others included deputy governor Thomas Dudley and assistant governors John Endicott, Richard Bellingham, William Hibbins, Increase Nowell, Simon Bradstreet, John Winthrop, Jr., and William Pynchon. Ann Hibbins, who was executed for witchcraft in 1656, was reputed to be the sister of Richard Bellingham, and was the widow of William Hibbins. William Hibbins was succeeded as assistant by Humphrey Atherton, who sat in judgment of Ann Hibbins.

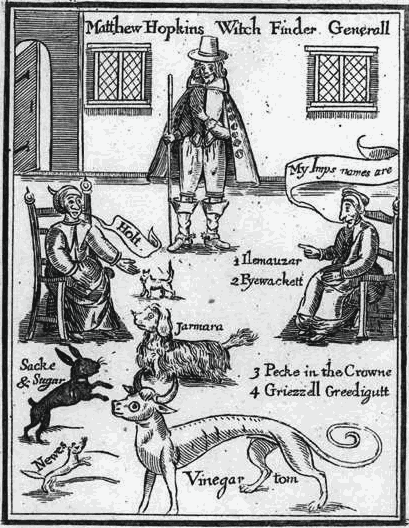
Matthew Hopkins, witch finder, identifying a witch's imps, c. 1647

Winthrop's journal does not reveal anything specific about what caused the accusations against Jones, or her husband, Thomas, who was also accused but not convicted. The case against her was built on evidence collected using the methods of General Matthew Hopkins, an English witch hunter. Hopkins manual on witch-hunting was published one year before Jones' conviction, in which Hopkins prescribed the practice of "watching" which required the accused to sit in a specific position, usually with legs crossed for a period of twenty four hours, during which she or he would be observed. If the person was a witch, it was supposed that within twenty four hours an imp would appear to feed off the witch. An imp was a small creature, or familiar, who depended upon the witch for daily sustenance. The watching of Margaret Jones occurred on May 18, 1648 and Winthrop recorded an imp was seen "In the clear light of day."

Winthrop recorded the evidence used to convict Jones in his journal:

"June 15, 1648: At this court, one Margaret Jones, of Charlestown, was indicted and found guilty of witchcraft, and hanged for it. The evidence against her was:
"1. That she was found to have such a malignant touch, as many persons, men, women, and children, whom she stroked or touched with any affection or displeasure, or etc. [sic], were taken with deafness, or vomiting, or other violent pains or sickness."

"2. She practising physic, and her medicines being such things as, by her own confession, were harmless, – as anise-seed, liquors, etc., – yet had extraordinary violent effects."

"3. She would use to tell such as would not make use of her physic, that they would never be healed; and accordingly their diseases and hurts continued, with relapse against the ordinary course, and beyond the apprehension of all physicians and surgeons."

"4. Some things which she foretold came to pass accordingly; other things she would tell of, as secret speeches, etc., which she had no ordinary means to come to the knowledge of."

"5. She had, upon search, an apparent teat ... as fresh as if it had been newly sucked; and after it had been scanned, upon a forced search, that was withered, and another began on the opposite side."

"6. In the prison, in the clear day-light, there was seen in her arms, she sitting on the floor, and her clothes up, etc., a little child, which ran from her into another room, and the officer following it, it was vanished. The like child was seen in two other places to which she had relation; and one maid that saw it, fell sick upon it, and was cured by the said Margaret, who used means to be employed to that end. Her behavior at her trial was very intemperate, lying notoriously, and railing upon the jury and witnesses, etc., and in the like distemper she died. The same day and hour she was executed, there was a very great tempest at Connecticut, which blew down many trees, etc." "

== Witness to the execution ==
John Hale, who was born in Charlestown, was 12 years old when he, along with other neighbors of Jones, visited her in prison on the day of her execution. He said in his writing, Modest Inquiry p. 17, that part of the reason for the charges being brought upon the condemned woman was that after she had quarreled with some neighbors, "some mischief befell" some of their cattle.

As an adult and a minister, Hale was an active participant in the bringing of charges in the Salem witch trials, but afterwards had a change of heart. Accusations of witchcraft against Rev. Hale's wife helped to bring an end to the proceedings.As the nineteenth century antiquarian, Charles Wentworth Upham put it:

The accusers, in aiming at such characters, overestimated their power; and the tide began to turn against them. But what finally broke the spell by which they had held the minds of the whole colony in bondage was their accusation, in October, of Mrs. Hale, the wife of the minister of the First Church in Beverly. Her genuine and distinguished virtues had won for her a reputation, and secured in the hearts of the people a confidence, which superstition itself could not sully nor shake. Mr. Hale had been active in all the previous proceedings; but he knew the innocence and piety of his wife, and he stood forth between her and the storm he had helped to raise: although he had driven it on while others were its victims, he turned and – resisted it when it burst in upon his own dwelling.

== Thomas Jones ==
After Jones was put to death, her husband, Thomas, who had been released from prison, tried to leave the colony on the ship, Welcome. However the ship, which had a heavy load of cargo, had trouble keeping its balance in fair weather. When it was realized that the husband of a condemned witch was on board and he had quarreled with the captain, Thomas was arrested and put back in prison. Upon his arrest, it was claimed, the ship immediately righted itself.

== See also ==
- List of people executed for witchcraft
