= Increase Nowell =

- Born: 1590
- Died: 1655 (aged 64–65)
- Occupation: British colonial administrator
- Era: Colonial era
- Known for: Founder of Charlestown, Massachusetts
- Title: First ruling elder of the First Church in Charlestown

Increase Nowell (1590–1655) was a British colonial administrator, original patentee of the Massachusetts Bay Company, founder of Charlestown, Massachusetts, and first ruling elder of the First Church in Charlestown.

He was baptized in 1593 at Sheldon, Warwickshire, on the estate bought in 1575 by his grandfather Laurence Nowell. He married at Holy Trinity, Minories, London.

He was named within The Charter of the Massachusetts Bay Company and in 1629 was created assistant to the Massachusetts Bay Colony being re-elected annually up until 1654.

He was an eminent member of the Puritan Great Migration of the 1630s. As a result of the Cambridge Agreement, emigrating shareholders bought out those not emigrating thus allowing the proposed colony autonomy from London. Nowell had dealings with transatlantic merchants and as the Winthrop Fleet was being assembled, he was recommended as good counsel concerning buying a ship.

In 1630 Nowell sailed with John Winthrop as a part of the original Puritan expedition to Massachusetts. Soon after arriving in the New World, Nowell became one of the original settlers of Charlestown, one of Massachusetts' earliest Puritan communities.

He was first ruling elder of the First Church in Charlestown, now The First Congregational Society of Charlestown, which was founded in November 1632 with Nowell named first on the covenant of the original members. The original meetinghouse is believed to have been in the vicinity today’s Thompson Square. Nowell conducted marriages but declined further ecclesiastical office. In 1637 John Harvard, benefactor of Harvard University was appointed minister for the church. Also in 1637, during the Antinomian Controversy, he was one of the magistrates during the trial of Anne Hutchinson, and with all the other magistrates voted for her banishment from the colony.

Nowell worked as a lay magistrate, military commissioner and colonial secretary (1636–50). On his death, his estate was valued at £592. In 1656 the General Court, sensible of the low condition of the family, initially granted 2,000 acres (8.1 km^{2}), with a further 3,200-acre (13 km^{2}) grant later

== Descendants ==
His eldest surviving son Samuel Nowell (1634–1688) graduated from Harvard College in 1653, and was chaplain under General Josiah Winslow in King Philip's War.

The founder of Radcliffe College in Cambridge, Massachusetts, Elizabeth Cabot Cary Agassiz, was a descendant of Nowell.
