= Ann Hibbins =

American woman hanged after conviction for witchcraft

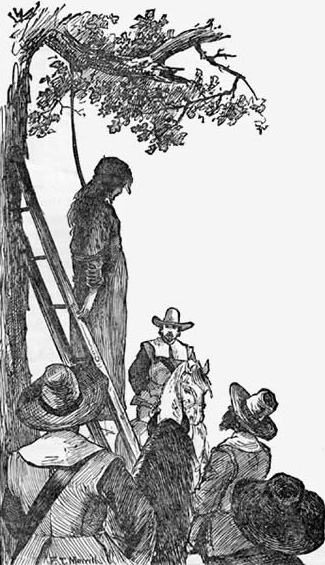
Hanging of Hibbins on Boston Common, June 19, 1656. Sketch by F.T. Merril, 1886

Ann Hibbins (also spelled Hibbons or Hibbens) was a woman executed for witchcraft in Boston, Massachusetts Bay Colony, on June 19, 1656. Her death by hanging was the third for witchcraft in Boston and predated the Salem witch trials of 1692. Hibbins was later fictionalized in Nathaniel Hawthorne's famous novel The Scarlet Letter. A wealthy widow, Hibbins was the sister-in-law by marriage to Massachusetts governor Richard Bellingham. Her sentence was handed down by Governor John Endicott. (Note: Also spelled "Endecott".)

== Life ==
Ann was twice widowed, first by a man named Moore. Together they had had three sons who were all living in England at the time of her death. One son, Jonathan, was particularly favored in her will.

Ann was widowed, secondly, by a wealthy merchant, William Hibbins whose first wife, Hester Bellingham (buried Stokesay, Shropshire on 3 Sep 1634), was the sister of Richard Bellingham, Governor of Massachusetts. He had been a deputy to the General Court and became assistant governor in 1643, and thus was one of the magistrates who condemned Margaret Jones for witchcraft in 1648. Hibbins held the powerful position of assistant until his death in 1654. Humphrey Atherton, who is said to have been "instrumental in bringing about the execution of Ann Hibbins", succeeded him in that position.

== Trial and death ==
In 1640, Hibbins sued a group of carpenters, whom she had hired to work on her house, accusing them of overcharging her. She won the lawsuit, but her actions were viewed as "abrasive", and so she became subjected to an ecclesiastical inquest. Refusing to apologize to the carpenters for her actions, Hibbins was admonished and excommunicated. The church cited her for usurping her husband's authority. Within months of her husband's death, a proceeding against her for witchcraft began.

Hibbins was tried and convicted in 1655, but her conviction was set aside. The case was heard again by the General Court. The Court's record from May 14, 1656, said:

Mrs. Ann Hibbins was called forth, appeared at the bar; the indictment against her was read, to which she answered not guilty, and was willing to be tried by God and this Court. The evidences against her were read, the parties witnessing being present, her answers considered on; and the whole Court being met together, by their vote determined that Mrs. Ann Hibbins is guilty of witchcraft, according to the bill of indictment found against her by the jury of life and death. The Governor in open Court pronounced sentence accordingly, declaring she was to go from the bar to the place from whence she came, and from thence to the place of execution, and there to hang till she was dead.

Historians have found two things out of the ordinary about Ann Hibbins' execution: that a woman of her high social standing would have been persecuted as a witch; and that no evidence, contemporary to her and used to convict her, survived.

She had some supporters, at least initially, among them selectman Joshua Scottow, who later apologized to the General Court for his support of Hibbins. Nine months after her execution, Scottow "stated that he did not intend to oppose the proceedings of the General Court in the case of Mrs. Ann Hibbins: "I am cordially sorry that anything from me, either in word or writing, should give offence to the honored Court, my dear brethren in the church, or any others."

Another supporter was a prominent minister, John Norton, who said privately, in the company of another prominent minister, John Wilson, that Ann Hibbins "was hanged for a witch only for having more wit than her neighbors." He further stated that Hibbins had "unhappily guessed that two of her persecutors, whom she saw talking in the street, were talking of her, — which cost her her life."

== The Scarlet Letter ==
Hibbins was fictionalized in Nathaniel Hawthorne's The Scarlet Letter. (Note: In the endnotes to one edition of The Scarlet Letter, edited by Nancy Stade, published by Spark Educational Publishing, 2004, it is incorrectly noted that Ann Hibbins was hanged as a witch in Salem.) In the novel, the central character, Hester Prynne, who has been convicted of adultery and sentenced to wearing the letter "A" upon her outer garment, comes in frequent contact with the witch, Mistress Hibbins.

Hawthorne's depiction of Hibbins has been analyzed by literary critics, who have determined that in the novel she, being a witch, represented for Prynne "a rejected possibility of dealing with social stigma". According to one analysis, "Hibbins embodies the stereotype of the aged witch who tries to use Hester's stigma, the scarlet 'A', as an item to seduce Hester to join the Covenant with the Devil." This is presented, in contrast, by the fictional depiction of Ann Hutchinson, who represents the embodiment of an angel.

== Other people executed for witchcraft in New England ==
Historian Clarence F. Jewett included a list of other people executed in New England in The Memorial History of Boston: Including Suffolk County, Massachusetts 1630–1880 (Boston: Ticknor and Company, 1881). He wrote,

The following is the list of the twelve persons who were executed for witchcraft in New England before 1692, when twenty other persons were executed at Salem, whose names are well known. It is possible that the list is not complete; but I have included all of which I have any knowledge, and with such details as to names and dates as could be ascertained:~~—~~

- 1647 — "Woman of Windsor", Connecticut (name unknown) [later identified as Alice Young], at Hartford
- 1648 — Margaret Jones, of Charlestown, at Boston
- 1648 — Mary Johnson, at Hartford
- 1650 — Goodwife Lake, wife of Henry, of Dorchester
- 1650 — Goodwife Kendall, of Cambridge
- 1651 — Mary Parsons, of Springfield, at Boston
- 1651 — Goodwife Bassett, at Fairfield, Conn
- 1653 — Goodwife Knap, at Hartford
- 1656 — Ann Hibbins, at Boston
- 1662 — Goodman Greensmith, at Hartford
- 1662 — Goodwife Greensmith, at Hartford
- 1688 — Goody Glover, at Boston

== See also ==
- List of people executed for witchcraft
