= Thomas Goffe (investor) =

English investor and magistrate (born 1598)

1st Deputy Governor of Massachusetts Bay Colony
- In office 1628 – October 20, 1629
- Monarch: Charles I
- Governor: Matthew Cradock
- Preceded by: Office established
- Succeeded by: John Humphrey

Personal details
- Born: c. 1598 England
- Occupation: Investor, Magistrate

Thomas Goffe (born c. 1598) was an English investor and magistrate who served as the deputy governor for Massachusetts Bay Colony upon its inception. He also served as the treasurer of the Massachusetts Bay Company, but was subject to immense debt throughout John Winthrop's tenure, with whom discord was present, in spite of his provision of vessels for Winthrop's voyage. Ultimately, his involvement in the colony proved financially detrimental, but nevertheless it advanced the Puritan cause, which was his foremost desire.
