= John Wilson (Puritan minister) =

English-born clergyman (c.1588–1667)

The Reverend John Wilson
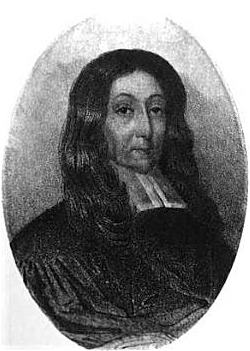
- Born: c. 1588; Windsor, Berkshire, England
- Died: August 7, 1667 (aged 78–79); Boston, Massachusetts Bay Colony
- Resting place: King's Chapel Burying Ground
- Education: B.A. 1609/10: King's College, Cambridge; M.A. 1613: Emmanuel College, Cambridge
- Occupation: Clergyman
- Spouse: Elizabeth Mansfield
- Children: Edmund, John, Elizabeth, Mary
- Parent(s): Reverend William Wilson and Isabel Woodhull

John Wilson (c. 1588 – 1667) was an English-born Puritan clergyman in Boston in the Massachusetts Bay Colony, and the minister of the First Church of Boston from its beginnings in Charlestown in 1630 until his death in 1667. He is most noted for being a minister at odds with Anne Hutchinson during the Antinomian Controversy from 1636 to 1638, and for being an attending minister during the execution of Mary Dyer in 1660.

Born into a prominent English family from Sudbury in Suffolk, his father was the chaplain to the Archbishop of Canterbury, and thus held a high position in the Anglican Church. Young Wilson was sent to school at Eton for four years, and then attended the university at King's College, Cambridge, where he received his B.A. in 1610. From there he studied law briefly, and then studied at Emmanuel College, Cambridge, where he received an M.A. in 1613. Following his ordination, he was the chaplain for some prominent families for a few years, before being installed as pastor in his home town of Sudbury. Over the next ten years, he was dismissed and then reinstated on several occasions, because of his strong Puritan sentiments which contradicted the practices of the established church.

As with many other Puritan divines, Wilson came to New England, and sailed with his friend John Winthrop and the Winthrop Fleet in 1630. He was the first minister of the settlers, who established themselves in Charlestown, but soon crossed the Charles River into Boston. Wilson was an encouragement to the early settlers during the very trying initial years of colonization. He made two return trips to England during his early days in Boston, the first time to persuade his wife to come, after she initially refused to make the trip, and the second time to transact some business. Upon his second return to the Massachusetts Bay Colony in 1635, Anne Hutchinson was first exposed to his preaching, and found an unhappy difference between his theology and that of her mentor, John Cotton, who was the other Boston minister. The theologically astute, sharp-minded, and outspoken Hutchinson, who had been hosting large groups of followers in her home, began to criticize Wilson, and the divide erupted into the Antinomian Controversy. Hutchinson was eventually tried and banished from the colony, as was her brother-in-law, Reverend John Wheelwright.

Following the controversy, Wilson and Cotton were able to work together to heal the divisions within the Boston church, but after Cotton's death, more controversy befell Boston as the Quakers began to infiltrate the orthodox colony with their evangelists. Greatly opposed to their theology, Wilson supported the actions taken against them, and supervised the execution of his former parishioner, Mary Dyer in 1660. He died in 1667.

== Early life ==
John Wilson was born in Windsor, Berkshire, England, about 1588, the son of the Reverend William Wilson. John's father, originally of Sudbury in Suffolk, was a chaplain to the Archbishop of Canterbury, Edmund Grindal. His father was also a prebend of St Paul's in London, a minister in Rochester, Kent, and a rector of the parish of Cliffe, Kent. Wilson's mother was Isabel Woodhull, the daughter of John Woodhull and Elizabeth Grindal, and a niece of Archbishop Grindal. According to Wilson's biographer, A. W. M'Clure, Archbishop Grindal favored the Puritans to the extent of his power, to the displeasure of Queen Elizabeth.

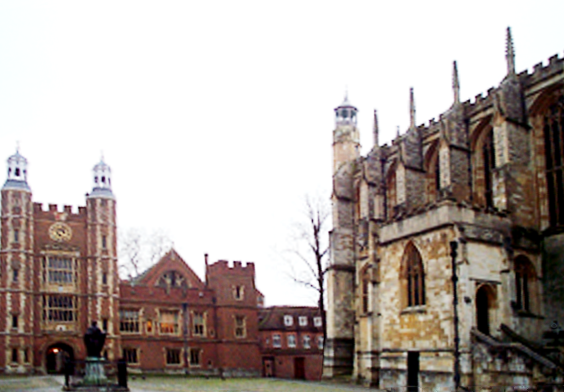
Eton College, where Wilson studied for four years

Wilson was first formally educated at Eton College, where he spent four years, and at one time was chosen to speak a Latin oration during the visit of the duc de Biron, ambassador from the court of Henry IV of France. The duke then gave him a special gift of a gold coin called "three angels", worth about ten shillings. On 23 August 1605, at the age of 14, Wilson was admitted to King's College, Cambridge. While there he was initially prejudiced against the Puritans, but changed his stance after reading Richard Rogers' Seven Treatises (1604), and he subsequently traveled to Dedham to hear Rogers preach. He and other like-minded students frequently met to discuss theology, and he also regularly visited prisons to minister to the inmates. He received his B.A. from King's College in 1609/10, then studied law for a year at the Inns of Court in London. He next attended Emmanuel College, Cambridge, noted for its Puritan advocacy, where he received his M.A. in 1613. While at Emmanuel, he likely formed a friendship with future New England divines, Cotton and Thomas Hooker. He was probably soon ordained as a minister in the Anglican Church, but records of this event are not extant.

In 1615 Wilson visited his dying father, who had these parting words for his son:

while thou wast at the university, because thou wouldst not conform, I fain would have brought thee to some higher preferment; but I see thy conscience is very scrupulous about somethings imposed in the church. Nevertheless, I have rejoiced to see the grace and fear of God in thy heart; and seeing thou hast hitherto maintained a good conscience, and walked according to thy light, do so still. Go by the rule of God's holy word, and the Lord bless thee.

Wilson preached for three years as the chaplain to several respectful families in Suffolk, one of them being the family of the Countess of Leicester. It was to her that he later dedicated his only book, Some Helps to Faith..., published in 1630. In time he was offered, and accepted, the position of minister at Sudbury, from where his family had originated. While there he met John Winthrop, and likely supported Winthrop's unsuccessful 1626 bid to become a member of Parliament. Wilson was suspended and then restored several times as minister, the issue being nonconformity (Puritan leanings) with the established practices of the Anglican Church. Like many Puritans, he began turning his thoughts toward New England.

== Massachusetts ==
Coat of Arms of John Wilson

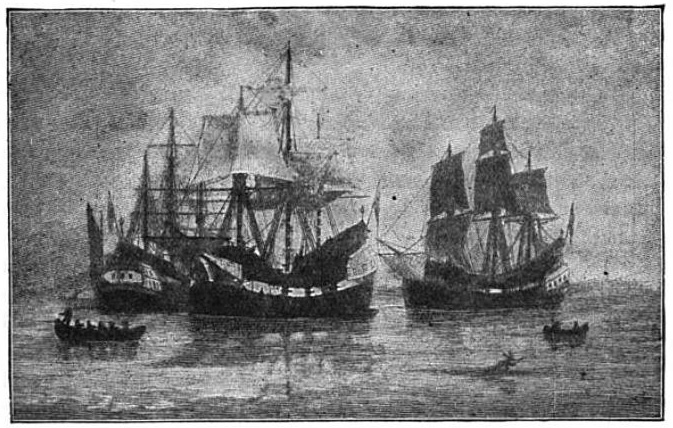
Wilson arrived in New England with the Winthrop Fleet in 1630.

Wilson was an early member of the Massachusetts Bay Company, and accompanied John Winthrop and the Winthrop Fleet to New England in 1630. As soon as they arrived, he, with Governor Winthrop, Thomas Dudley, and Isaac Johnson, entered into a formal and solemn covenant with each other to walk together in the fellowship of the gospel. Life was harsh in the new wilderness, and Plymouth historian Nathaniel Morton said that Wilson "bare a great share of the difficulties of these new beginnings with great cheerfulness and alacrity of spirit." Wilson was chosen the pastor of their first church in Charlestown, being installed as teacher there on 27 August 1630, and in the same month the General Court ordered that a dwelling-house should be built for him at the public expense, and the governor and Sir Richard Saltonstall were appointed to put this into effect. By the same authority it was also ordered, that Wilson's salary, until the arrival of his wife, should be 20 pounds a year. After the Charlestown church was established, most of its members moved across the Charles River to Boston, after which services were held alternately on each side of the river, and then later only in Boston.

Well before leaving England, Wilson was married to Elizabeth Mansfield, the daughter of Sir John Mansfield, and had at least two children born in England, but his wife had initially refused to come to New England with him. Her refusal was the subject of several letters sent from John Winthrop's wife, Margaret, to her son John Winthrop Jr., in May 1631. Wilson then made a trip back to England from 1631 to 1632. Though his biographer, in 1870, stated that she still did not come back to New England with Wilson until 1635, Anderson in 1995 pointed out that the couple had a child baptized in Boston in 1633; therefore she had to have come with Wilson during this earlier trip.

On 2 July 1632 Wilson was admitted as a freeman of the colony, and later the same month the first meeting house was built in Boston. For this and Wilson's parsonage, the congregation made a voluntary contribution of 120 pounds. On 25 October 1632 Wilson, with Governor Winthrop and a few other men, set out on a friendly visit to Plymouth where they were hospitably received. They held a worship service on the Sabbath, and that same afternoon they met again, and engaged in a discussion centered around a question posed by the Plymouth teacher, Roger Williams. William Bradford, the Plymouth governor, and William Brewster, the ruling elder, spoke, after which Governor Winthrop and Wilson were invited to speak. The Boston men returned the following Wednesday, with Winthrop riding Governor Bradford's horse.

On 23 November, Wilson, who had previously been ordained teacher, was installed as minister of the First Church of Boston. In 1633 the church at Boston received another minister, when Cotton arrived and was installed as teacher. In November 1633 Wilson made one of his many visits outside Boston, and went to Agawam (later Ipswich), since the settlers there did not yet have a minister. He also visited the natives, tending to their sick, and instructing others who were capable of understanding him. In this regard he became the first Protestant missionary to the North American native people, a work later to be carried on with much success by Reverend John Eliot. Closer to home, Wilson sometimes led groups of Christians, including magistrates and other ministers, to the church lectures in nearby towns, sharing his "heavenly discourse" during the trip.

In late 1634, Wilson made his final trip to England, leaving the ministry of the Boston Church in the hands of his co-pastor, Cotton, and traveling with John Winthrop Jr. While returning to England he had a harrowing experience off the coast of Ireland during some violent winter weather, and though other ships perished, his landed. During his journey across Ireland and England, Wilson was able to minister to many people, and tell them about New England. In his journal, John Winthrop noted that while in Ireland, Wilson "gave much satisfaction to the Christians there about New England." Leaving England for the final time on 10 August 1635, Wilson arrived back in New England on the third of October. Soon after his return, M'Clure writes, "the Antinomian Controversy broke out and raged for two...years and with a fury that threatened the destruction of his church."

== Antinomian Controversy ==
Wilson first became acquainted with Anne Hutchinson when in 1634, as the minister of the Boston Church, he was notified of some heterodox views that she revealed while en route to New England on the ship Griffin. A minister aboard the ship was questioned by her in such a way as to cause him some alarm, and word was sent to Wilson. In conference with Cotton, his co-minister in Boston, Hutchinson was examined, and deemed suitable for church membership, though admitted a week later than her husband because of initial uncertainty.

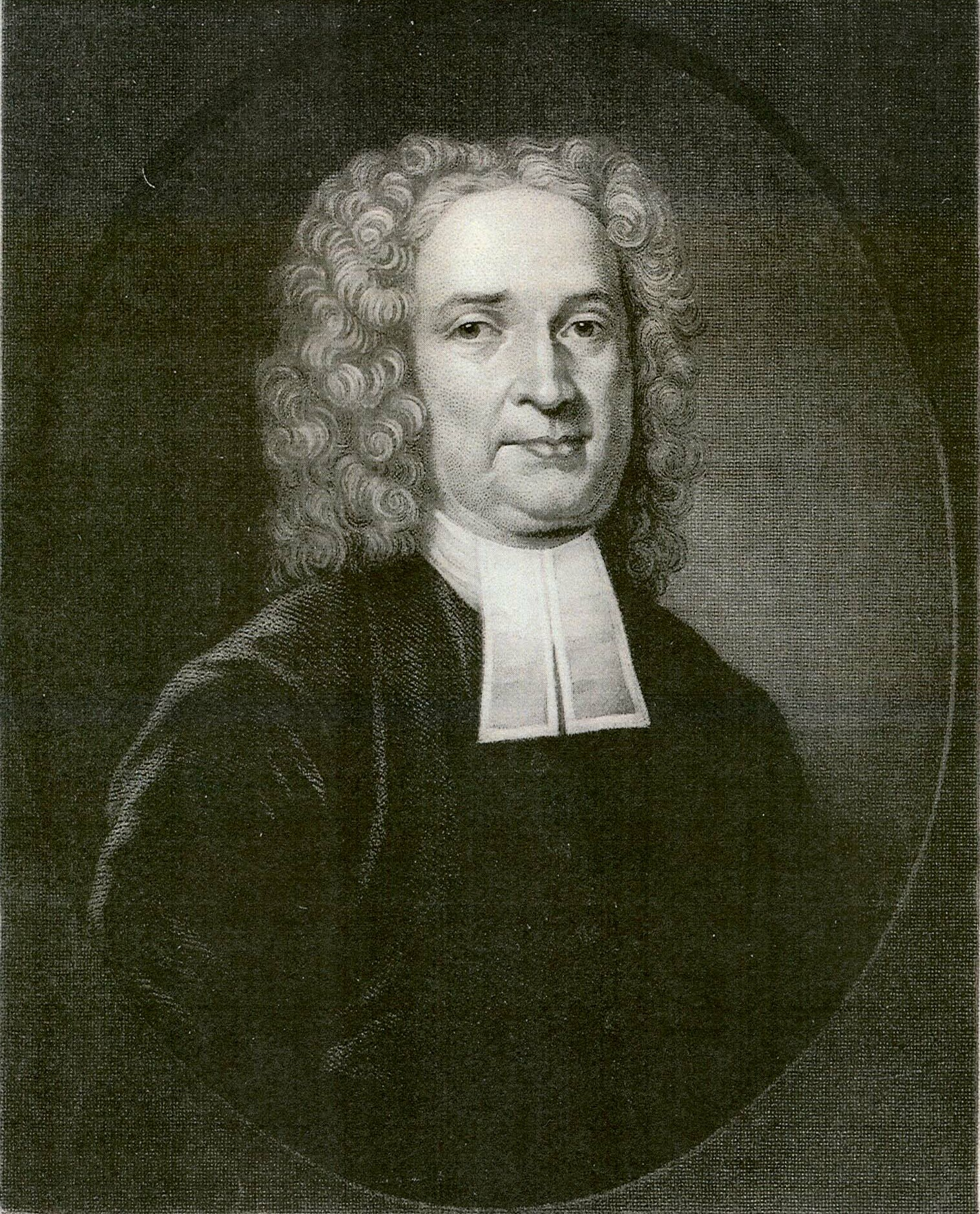
John Cotton shared the ministry with Wilson at the Boston church.

When Wilson returned from his England trip in 1635, he was accompanied aboard the ship Abigail by two other people who would play a role in the religious controversy to come. One of these was the Reverend Hugh Peter, who became the minister in Salem, and the other was a young aristocrat, Henry Vane the Younger, who soon became the governor of the colony.

In the pulpit, Wilson was said to have a voice that was harsh and indistinct and his demeanor was directed at strict discipline, but he had a penchant for rhymes, and would frequently engage in word play. He was unpopular during his early days of preaching in Boston, partly attributable to his strictness in teaching, and partly from his violent and arbitrary manner. His gruff style was further highlighted by the mild qualities of Cotton, with whom he shared the church's ministry. When Wilson returned to Boston in 1635, Hutchinson was exposed to his teaching for the first time, and immediately saw a big difference between her own doctrines and his. She found his emphasis on morality, and his doctrine of "evidencing justification by sanctification" (a covenant of works) to be repugnant, and she told her followers that Wilson lacked "the seal of the Spirit." Wilson's doctrines were shared with all of the other ministers in the colony, except for Cotton, and the Boston congregation had grown accustomed to Cotton's lack of emphasis on preparation "in favor of stressing the inevitability of God's will." The positions of Cotton and Wilson were matters of emphasis, and neither minister believed that works could help to save a person. It is likely that most members of the Boston church could not see much difference between the doctrines of the two men, but the astute Hutchinson could, prompting her to criticize Wilson at her home gatherings. Probably in early 1636 he became aware of divisions within his own Boston congregation, and soon came to realize that Hutchinson's views were widely divergent from those of the orthodox clergy in the colony.

Wilson said nothing of his discovery, but instead preached his covenant of works even more vehemently. As soon as Winthrop became aware of what was happening, he made an entry in his journal about Hutchinson, who did "meddle in such things as are proper for men, whose minds are stronger." He also noted the 1636 arrival in the colony of Hutchinson's in-law who became an ally in religious opinion: "There joined with her in these opinions a brother of hers, one Mr. Wheelwright, a silenced minister sometimes in England."

=== Meetings of the ministers ===
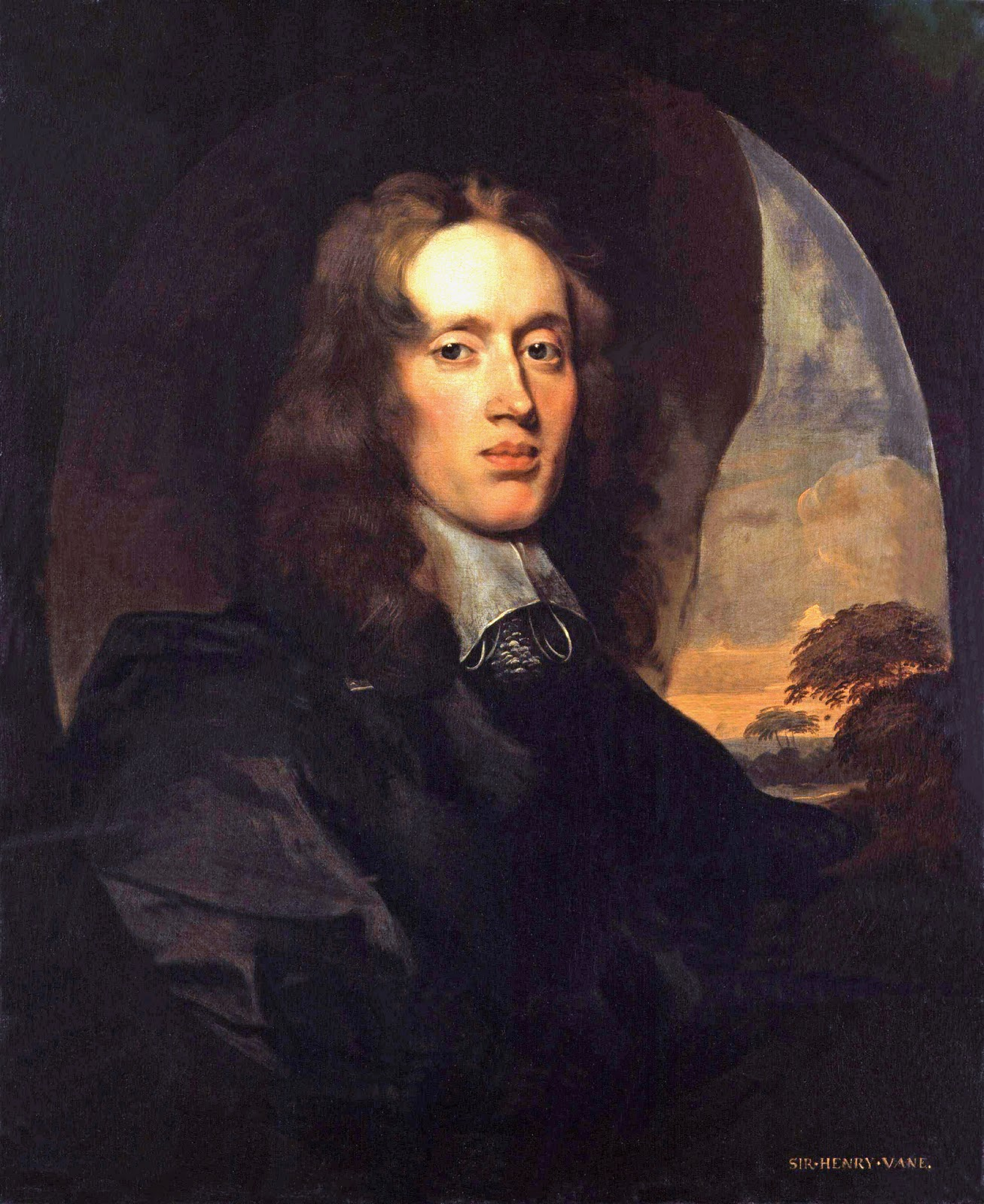
Governor Henry Vane was furious over Wilson's "sad speech," which cast aspersions on Cotton.

In October 1636 the ministers, realizing that a theological tempest was forming in the colony, decided to get to the heart of the issue, and held a series of meetings, which also included Hutchinson and some of the magistrates. In order to deal with the theological errors of the Hutchinson group, the ministers first had to come to a consensus about their own positions, and this they were unable to do. Hutchinson's followers used this impasse to attempt to have Wheelwright appointed as another minister to the Boston church, an expression of their dissatisfaction with Wilson. Winthrop came to Wilson's rescue, as an elder in the church, by invoking a ruling requiring unanimity in a church vote, and was thus able to forestall Wheelwright's appointment there. Instead, Wheelwright was sent about ten miles south to Mount Wollaston to preach.

As the meetings continued into December 1636, the theological debate escalated. Wilson delivered "a very sad speech of the condition of our churches," insinuating that Cotton, his fellow Boston minister, was partly responsible for the dissension. Wilson's speech was moved to represent the sense of the meeting, and was approved by all of the ministers and magistrates present with the notable exceptions of Vane, Cotton, Wheelwright, and two strong supporters of Hutchinson, William Coddington and Richard Dummer.

Cotton, normally of a very placid disposition, was indignant over the proceedings and lead a delegation to admonish Wilson for his uncharitable insinuations. On Saturday, 31 December 1636, the Boston congregants met to prefer charges against Wilson. Vane launched the attack, and was joined by other members of the congregation. Wilson met the onslaught with a quiet dignity, and responded soberly to each of the accusations brought against him. The crowd refused to accept his excuses, and demanded a vote of censure. At this point Cotton intervened, and with more restraint than his parishioners, offered that without unanimity a vote of censure was out of order. While the ultimate indignity of censure was averted, Cotton nevertheless gave a grave exhortation to his colleague to allay the temper of the congregants. The next day Wilson preached such a conciliatory sermon that even Vane rose and voiced his approval.

=== "Dung cast on their faces" ===
The Boston congregants, followers of Hutchinson, were now emboldened to seize the offensive and discredit the orthodox doctrines at services throughout the colony. The saddened Winthrop lamented, "Now the faithfull Ministers of Christ must have dung cast on their faces, and be not better than legall Preachers." As Hutchinson's followers attacked ministers with questions calculated to diminish confidence in their teachings, Winthrop continued his lament, "so many objections made by the opinionists...against our doctrine delivered, if it suited not their new fancies." When Wilson rose to preach or pray, the Hutchinsonians boldly rose and walked out of the meeting house. While Wilson was the favorite butt of this abuse, it was not restricted just to the Boston church, and similar gestures were being made toward the other ministers who preached a covenant of works.

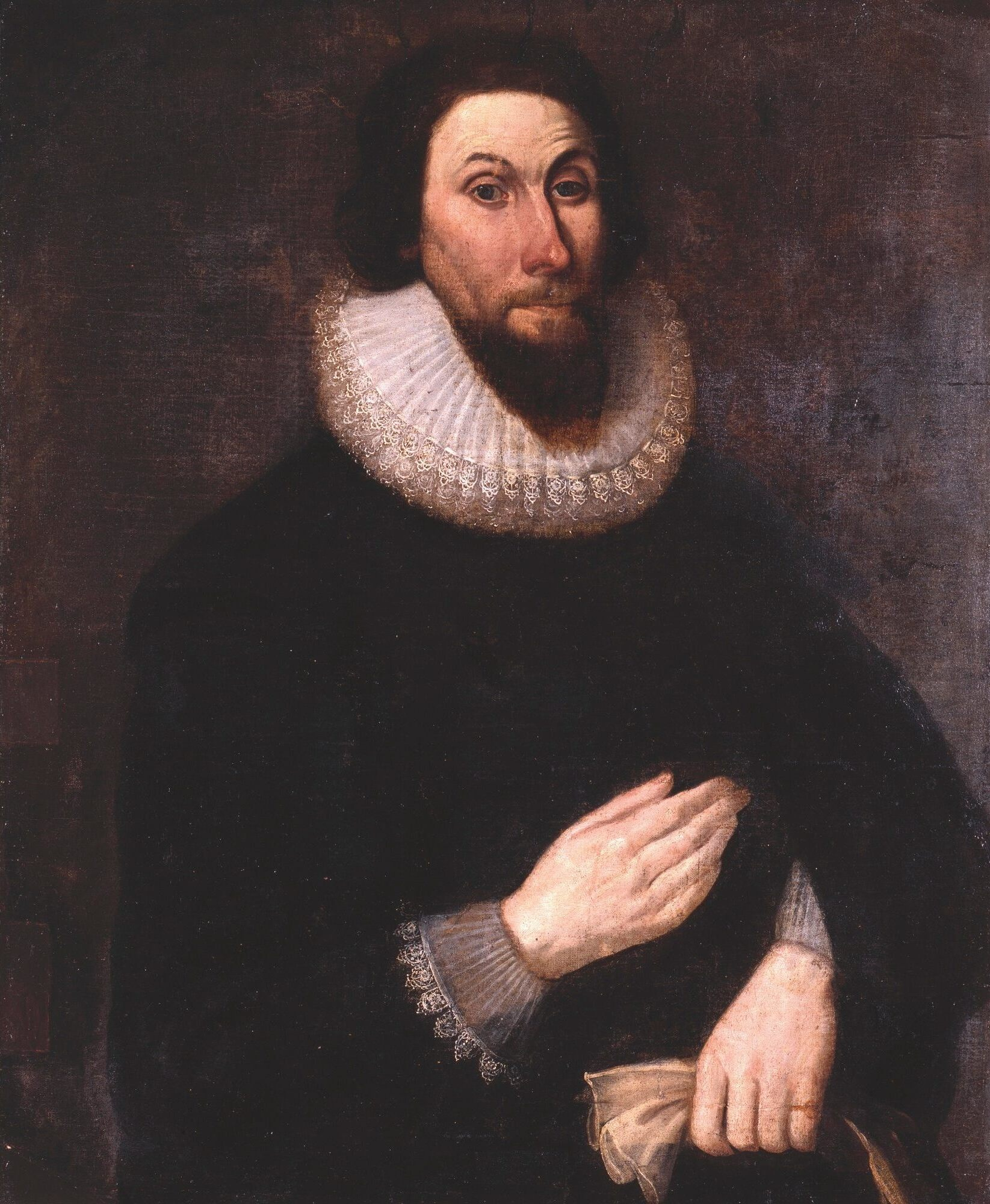
John Winthrop, after lamenting the attacks on the ministers, was buoyed by the results of the 1637 election

In hopes of bringing the mounting crisis under control, the General Court called for a day of fasting and repentance to be held on Thursday, 19 January 1637. During the Boston church service held that day, Cotton invited Wheelwright to come forward and deliver a sermon. Instead of the hoped-for peace, the opposite transpired. In the sermon Wheelwright stated that those who taught a covenant of works were Antichrists, and all the ministers besides Cotton saw this as being directed at them, though Wheelwright later denied this. During a meeting of the General Court in March Wheelwright was questioned at length, and ultimately charged with sedition, though not sentenced.

=== Election of May 1637 ===
The religious division had by now become a political issue, resulting in great excitement during the elections of May 1637. The orthodox party of the majority of magistrates and ministers maneuvered to have the elections moved from Boston to Newtown (later Cambridge) where the Hutchinsonians would have less support. The Boston supporters of Hutchinson wanted a petition to be read before the election, but the orthodox party insisted on holding the election first. Tempers flared, and bitter words gave way to blows as zealots on both sides clamored to have their opinions heard. During the excitement, Reverend Wilson was lifted up into a tree, and he bellowed to the crowd below, imploring them to look at their charter, to which a cry went out for the election to take place. The crowd then divided, with a majority going to one end of the common to hold the election, leaving the Boston faction in the minority by themselves. Seeing the futility of resisting further, the Boston group joined in the election.

The election was a sweeping victory for the orthodox party, with Vane replaced by Winthrop as governor, and Hutchinson supporters William Coddington and Richard Dummer losing their positions as magistrates. Soon after the election, Wilson volunteered to be the minister of a military unit that went to Connecticut to settle the conflict with the Pequot Indians. When he returned to Boston on 5 August, two days after Vane boarded a ship for England, never to return, Wilson was summoned to take part in a synod of all the colony's ministers. Many theological issues needed to be put to rest, and new issues that arose during the course of the controversy had to be dealt with.

=== Trials of Hutchinson ===
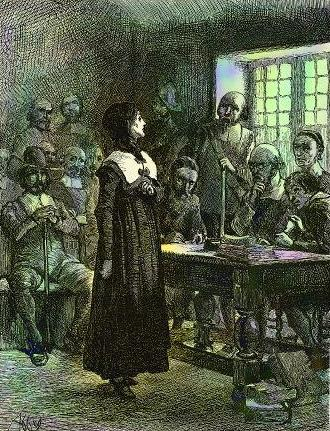
While Wilson had little to say during Hutchinson's civil trial, he delivered the final pronouncement at her church trial.

By late 1637, the conclusion of the controversy was beginning to take shape. During the court held in early November, Wheelwright was finally sentenced to banishment, the delay caused by the hopes that he would, at some point, recant. On 7 November the trial of Anne Hutchinson began, and Wilson was there with most of the other ministers in the colony, though his role was somewhat restrained. During the second day of the trial, when things seemed to be going in her favor, Hutchinson insisted on making a statement, admitting that her knowledge of things had come from a divine inspiration, prophesying her deliverance from the proceedings, and announcing that a curse would befall the colony. This was all that her judges needed to hear, and she was accused of heresy and sentenced to banishment, though she would be held in detention for four months, awaiting a trial by the clergy. While no statements made by Wilson were recorded in either existing transcript of this trial, Wilson did make a speech against Hutchinson at the end of the proceedings, to which Hutchinson responded with anger four months later during her church trial.

Her church trial took place at the Boston meeting house on two consecutive Thursdays in March 1638. Hutchinson was accused of numerous theological errors of which only four were covered during the first day, so the trial was scheduled to continue the following week, when Wilson took an active part in the proceedings. During this second day of interrogation a week later, Hutchinson read a carefully written recantation of her theological errors. Had the trial ended there, she would have likely remained in communion with the church, with the possibility of even returning there some day. Wilson, however, did not accept this recantation, and he re-opened a line of questioning from the previous week. With this, a new onslaught began, and when later given the opportunity, Wilson said, "[The root of]... your errors...is the slightinge of Gods faythfull Ministers and contenminge and cryinge down them as Nobodies." Hugh Peter chimed in, followed by Thomas Shepard, and then Wilson spoke again, "I cannot but reverence and adore the wise hand of God...in leavinge our sister to pride and Lyinge." Then John Eliot made his statement, and Wilson resumed, "Consider how we cane...longer suffer her to goe on still in seducinge to seduce, and in deacevinge to deaceve, and in lyinge to lye!"

As the battering continued, even Cotton chided her, and while concerns from the congregation brought pause to the ministers, the momentum still remained with them. When the final points of order were addressed, it was left to Wilson to deliver the final blow: "The Church consentinge to it we will proced to excommunication." He then continued, "Forasmuch as you, Mrs. Hutchinson, have highly transgressed and offended...and troubled the Church with your Errors and have drawen away many a poor soule, and have upheld your Revelations; and forasmuch as you have made a Lye...Therefor in the name of our Lord Je[sus] Ch[rist]...I doe cast you out and...deliver you up to Sathan...and account you from this time forth to be a Hethen and a Publican...I command you in the name of Ch[rist] Je[sus] and of this Church as a Leper to withdraw your selfe out of the Congregation."

== Later years ==
Hutchinson left the colony within a week of her excommunication, and following this conclusion of the Antinomian Controversy, Wilson worked with Cotton to reunite the Boston church. Following Cotton's death in 1652, his position was filled, following four years of campaigning, by John Norton from Ipswich. Norton held this position until his death in 1663.

Wilson was an early advocate of the conversion of Indians to Christianity, and acted on this belief by taking the orphaned son of Wonohaquaham, a local sagamore into his home to educate. In 1647 he visited the "praying Indians" of Nonantum, and noticed that they had built a house of worship that Wilson described as appearing "like the workmanship of an English housewright." During the 1650s and 1660s, in order to boost declining membership in the Boston church, Wilson supported a ruling known as the Half-Way Covenant, allowing parishioners to be brought into the church without having had a conversion experience.

In 1656, Wilson and John Norton were the two ministers of the Boston church when the widow Ann Hibbins was convicted of witchcraft by the General Court and executed in Boston. Hibbins' husband died in 1654, and the unhappy widow was first tried the next year following complaints of her neighbors about her behavior. Details of the event are lacking, because the great Boston journalist, John Winthrop was dead, and the next generations of note takers, Increase Mather and Cotton Mather had not yet emerged. A 1684 letter, however, survives, written by a Reverend Beach in Jamaica to Increase Mather in New England. In the letter Beach stated that he, Wilson and others were guests at Norton's table when Norton made the statement that the only reason Hibbins was executed was because she had more wit than her neighbors, thus implying her innocence. The sentiments of Wilson are not specifically expressed in the letter, though several writers have inferred that his sentiments were the same as Norton's.

== Execution of Mary Dyer ==
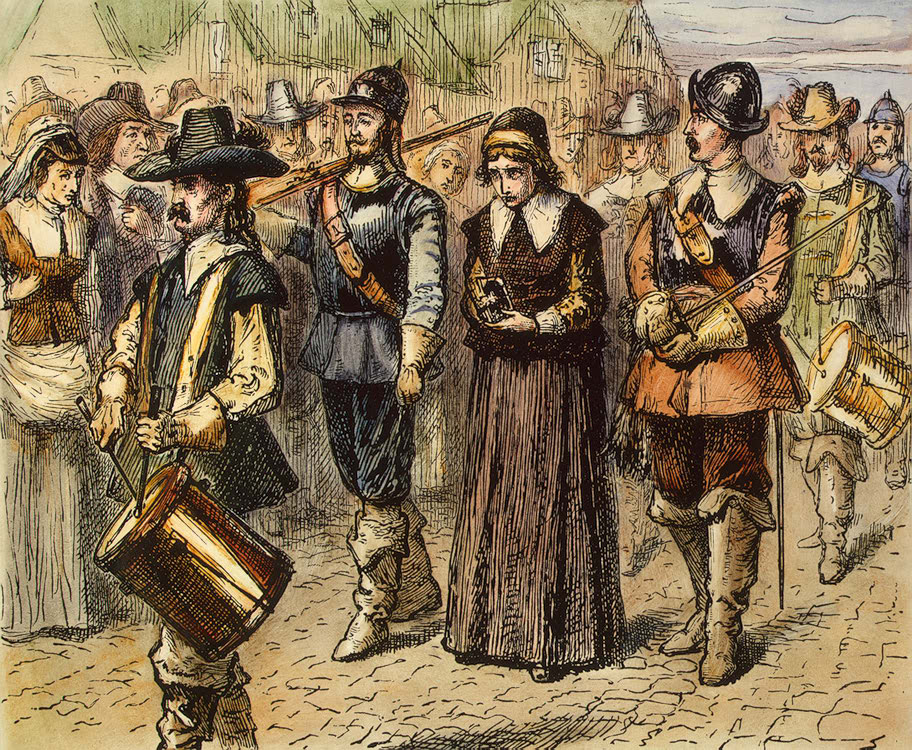
Wilson exhorted Mary Dyer to repent, but it was her goal to hang as a martyr.

In the 1650s Quaker missionaries began filtering into the Massachusetts Bay Colony, mostly from Rhode Island, creating alarm among the colony's magistrates and ministers, including Wilson. In 1870, M'Clure wrote that Wilson "blended an intense love of truth with as intense a hatred of error", referring to the Quakers' marked diversion from Puritan orthodoxy.

On 27 October 1659 three Quakers—Marmaduke Stevenson, William Robinson and Mary Dyer—were led to the Boston gallows from the prison where they had been recently held for their Quaker evangelism, against which Massachusetts had enacted very strict laws. Wilson, now nearly 70, as pastor of the Boston church was on hand as the supervising minister. As the two Quaker men first approached the gallows, wearing hats, Wilson said to Robinson, "Shall such jacks as you come in before authority with your hats on?" Ignoring the barb, Robinson then let forth a barrage of words, to which Wilson angrily responded, "Hold thy tongue, be silent; thou art going to die with a lie in your mouth." The two Quaker men were then hanged, after which it was Dyer's turn to ascend the ladder. As the noose was fastened about her neck, and her face covered, a young man came running and shouting, wielding a document which he waved before the authorities. Governor Endecott had stayed her execution. After the two executions had taken place, Wilson was said to have written a ballad about the event, which was sung by young men around Boston.

Not willing to let public sentiment over the executions subside, Dyer knew that she had to go through with her martyrdom. After the winter she returned to the Bay Colony in May 1660, and was immediately arrested. On the 31st of the month she was brought before Endecott, who questioned her briefly, and then pronounced her execution for the following day. On 1 June, Dyer was once again led to the gallows, and while standing at the hanging tree for the final time, Wilson, who had received her into the Boston church 24 years earlier and had baptized her son Samuel, called to her. His words were, "Mary Dyer, O repent, O repent, and be not so deluded and carried away by deceit of the devil." Her reply was, "Nay, man, I am not now to repent." With these final words, the ladder was kicked away, and she died when her neck snapped.

== Death and legacy ==
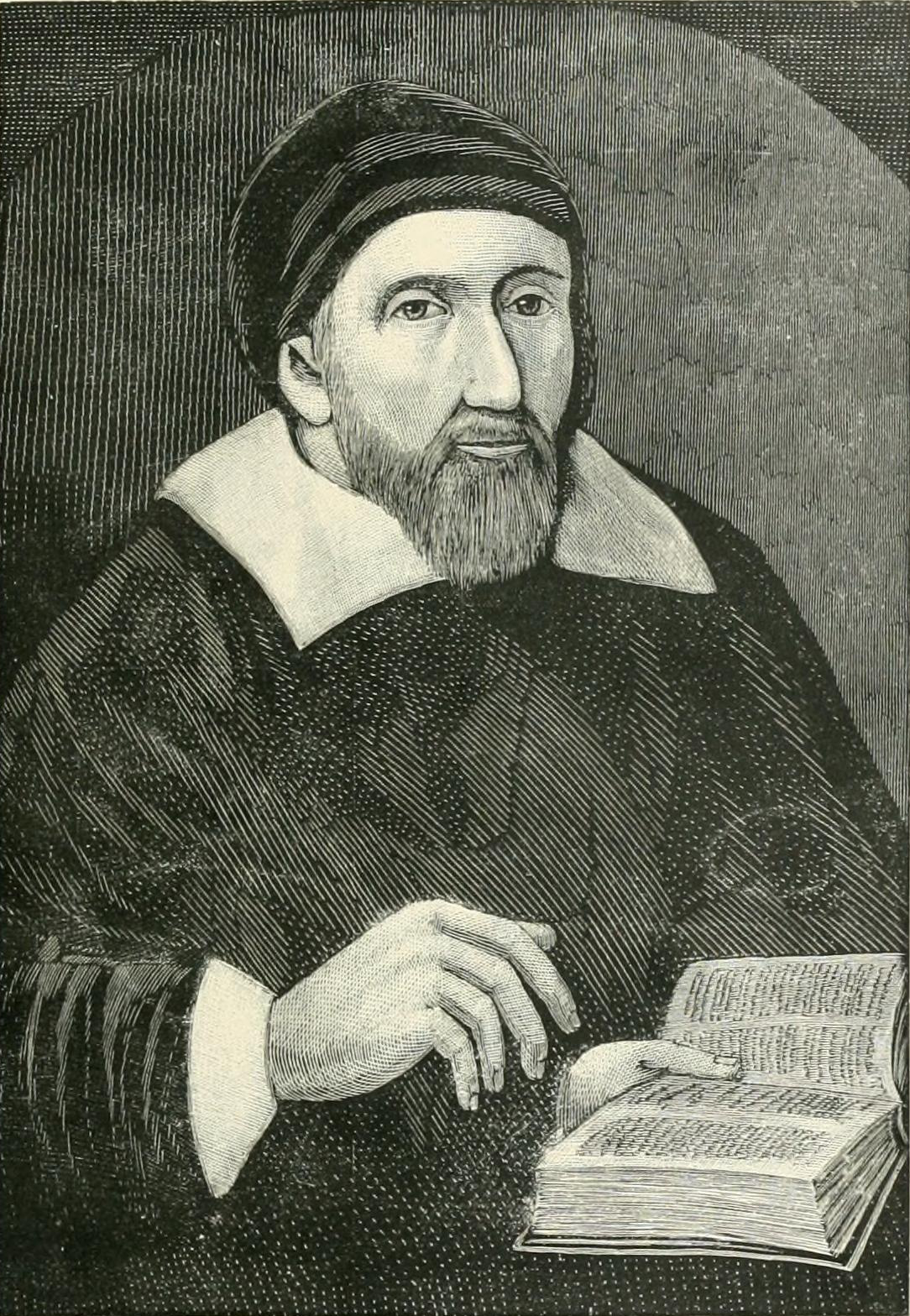
Richard Mather was one of several ministers remembered in Wilson's 1667 will.

Wilson's final years were marked by a prolonged illness. In his will, dated 31 May 1667, Wilson remembered a large number of people, among them being several of the local ministers, including Richard Mather of Dorchester and Thomas Shepard Jr. of Charlestown. He died on 7 August 1667, and his son-in-law Samuel Danforth wrote, "About two of the clock in the morning, my honored Father, Mr. John Wilson, Pastor to the church of Boston, aged about 78 years and an half, a man eminent in faith, love, humility, self-denial, prayer, sound[n]ess of mind, zeal for God, liberality to all men, esp[ecial]ly to the s[ain]ts & ministers of Christ, rested from his labors & sorrows, beloved & lamented of all, and very honorably interred the day following." His funeral sermon was preached by local divine, Increase Mather.

Wilson was notable for making anagrams based on the names of his friends and acquaintances. M'Clure described them as numerous and nimble, and if not exact, they were always instructive, and he would rather force a poor match than lose the moral. An anecdote given by Wilson biographer M'Clure, whether true or not, points to the character of Wilson: a person met Wilson returning from a journey and remarked, "Sir, I have sad news for you: while you have been abroad, your house is burnt." To this Wilson is reputed to have replied, "Blessed be God! He has burnt this house, because he intends to give me a better."

In 1809 historian John Eliot called Wilson affable in speech, but condescending in his deportment. An early mentor of his, Dr. William Ames, wrote, "that if he might have his option of the best condition this side of heaven, it would be [to be] the teacher of a congregational church of which Mr. Wilson was pastor." Plymouth historian Nathaniel Morton called him "eminent for love and zeal" and M'Clure wrote that his unfeigning modesty was excessive. In this vein, M'Clure wrote that Wilson refused to ever sit for a portrait and his response to those who suggested he do so was "What! Such a poor vile creature as I am! Shall my picture be drawn? I say No; it never shall." M'Clure then suggested that the line drawing of Wilson in the Massachusetts Historical Society was made after his death. Cotton Mather, the noted Puritan who was a grandson of both Richard Mather and Cotton wrote of Wilson, "If the picture of this good, and therein great man, were to be exactly given, great zeal, with great love, would be the two principal strokes that, joined with orthodoxy, should make up his portraiture."

== Family ==
Wilson's wife, Elizabeth, was a sister of Anne Mansfield, the wife of the wealthy Captain Robert Keayne of Boston, who made a bequest to Elizabeth in his 1656 will. With his wife, Wilson had four known children, the oldest of whom, Edmund, returned to England, married, and had children. Their next child, John Jr., attended Harvard College in 1642 and married Sarah Hooker, the daughter of the Reverend Thomas Hooker. The Wilsons then had two daughters, the older of whom, Elizabeth, married Reverend Ezekiel Rogers of Rowley, and then died while pregnant with their first child. The younger daughter, Mary, who was born in Boston on 12 September 1633, married first Reverend Samuel Danforth, and following his death she married Joseph Rock.

== See also ==
- History of Boston
- History of Massachusetts
