= Isaac Stearns =

- Born: February 25, 1598; Nayland, Suffolk, England
- Died: June 19, 1671 (aged 75–76)
- Occupation: Tailor
- Known for: Early immigrant to America

Coat of Arms of Isaac Stearns

Isaac Stearns (February 25, 1598 – June 19, 1671) was an English emigrant who, on April 8, 1630, embarked from Yarmouth, England, aboard the ship Arbella. He was among the original settlers of the Massachusetts Bay Colony. Stearns was born c. 1598. He worked as a tailor and married Mary Barker (c. 1604–77) on May 20, 1622, with whom he fathered eight children. His pedigree is unknown, and it is uncertain from where in England he came, but his wife was from the parish of Nayland, in Suffolk, and their first three children were born there.

== Emigration ==
The Arbella arrived in Salem, Massachusetts, on June 12, 1630, but the passengers disliked the location as a place for a permanent settlement, so they proceeded to Charlestown and were among the first settlers of Watertown, near Mount Auburn, Massachusetts. Stearns was declared a freeman on May 18, 1631; he was elected to the area's Board of selectmen several years later. In 1647, Stearns was appointed by the community's selectmen to plan a bridge over the Charles River. This is the first mention of a bridge over the Charles River at Watertown.

== Descendants ==
Isaac was accompanied on the Arbella by a brother, Shubael Stearns, who died, leaving his children to Isaac's care, but the records are unclear which children belonged to whom. Isaac is thought to be the first American ancestor of the Massachusetts Stearns. Every attempt to trace the Stearns lineage in the United States has led back to him, or to Charles or Nathaniel Stearns, men believed to have either been Isaac's brothers or nephews. Notable descendants of Isaac Stearns include Richard Nixon and T. S. Eliot.

== Death ==
Isaac Stearns died on June 19, 1671. The appraisal of his estate suggests he was relatively wealthy; it included fourteen parcels of land, amounting to 467 acres (189 ha), with a significant quantity of stock and farming utensils, provisions, and household goods.

== Bibliography ==
- Gordon, Lyndall (1998). T. S. Eliot: An Imperfect Life. W. W. Norton & Company. p. 262. ISBN 9780393047288.
- Lambdin, Laura C.; Lambdin, Robert T. (2008). Arthurian Writers: A Biographical Encyclopedia. ABC-CLIO. ISBN 9780313346828.
- Sparks, John (Feb 5, 2015). The Roots of Appalachian Christianity: The Life and Legacy of Elder Shubal Stearns. Lexington, Kentucky: University Press of Kentucky. pp. 1–2. ISBN 9780813158396.
- Stearn, Cyrus; Stearn, Jacob; Taggart, Marshall; McFarlan, Elizabeth (1885). Our Kindred: The McFarlan and Stern Families, of Chester County, Pa., and New Castle County, Del. F.S. Hickman.
- Van Wagenen, Avis Stearns (1901). Genealogy and Memoirs of Isaac Stearns and His Descendants. Syracuse, New York: Courier Printing Company.
- Winthrop Society. Settlers. Winthrop Society. Archived from the original on 2015-12-18.
