= Edward Clinton, Lord Clinton =

English politician

Edward Clinton, Baron Clinton (1624–1657) was an English politician who sat in the House of Commons from 1646 to 1648.

Clinton was the son of Theophilus Clinton, 4th Earl of Lincoln, 12th Baron Clinton and his wife, the Hon. Bridget Fiennes, daughter of William Fiennes, Viscount Say and Sele.

In 1646 Clinton was elected Member of Parliament for Callington in the Long Parliament. He sat until 1648 when he was excluded under Pride's Purge.

Clinton died in London at the age of 33.

Clinton married Lady Anne Holles by 1652. Their son was Edward Clinton, 5th Earl of Lincoln, 13th Baron Clinton.

Parliament of England
Preceded by Sir Arthur Ingram; Hon. George Fane	Member of Parliament for Callington; 1646–1648; With: Thomas Dacres	Succeeded by Not represented in Rump Parliament
