= Edward Convers =

American Puritan settler (1590–1663)

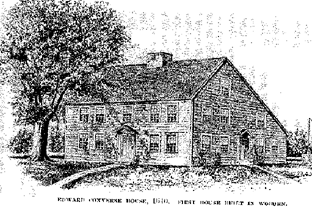
Deacon Edward Converse House, first house built in Woburn, 1640

Deacon Edward Convers (January 20, 1590 – August 10, 1663) was an early Puritan settler in the Massachusetts Bay Colony, and was one of the founders of Woburn, Massachusetts.

Convers was born in England on January 20, 1590. After his first wife (Sarah Parker) died in 1625, he married Sarah Stone in 1629. He and his family arrived in Salem, Massachusetts, with the Winthrop Fleet on June 8, 1630, in the early stages of the Great Migration.

Convers built the first house and mill in the town of Woburn. He was active in town affairs, serving as one of its first selectmen. He served on "every committee and had a part in every movement that had this new settlement in view." He also helped establish Charlestown. He was one of the colony's wealthy landowners, and was a farmer, miller and surveyor.

Convers also founded the First Church of Charlestown, and established the first ferry from Charlestown to Boston. The ferry operated where the Charles River Bridge is now located, and was referred to as the "Great Ferry" (to distinguish it from a smaller ferry operating between Charlestown and Winnisimmet). He died on August 10, 1663, in Woburn, Massachusetts.
