= William Ives Budington =

American minister (1815–1879)

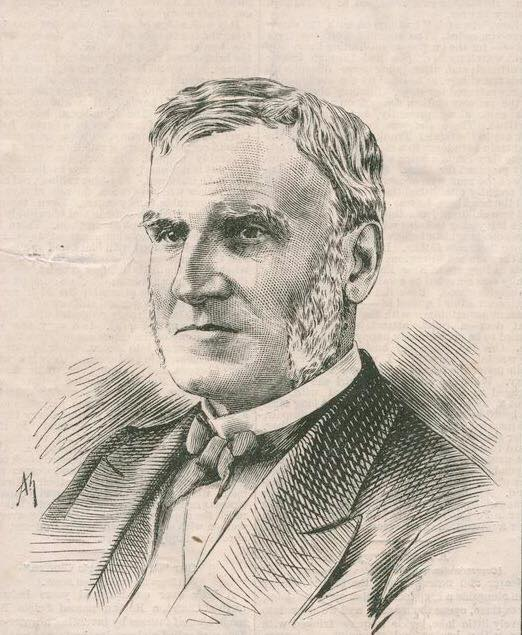
William Ives Budington

William Ives Budington (April 21, 1815 – November 29, 1879) was an American minister.

Budington was born in New Haven, Conn., April 21, 1815, the son of William and Lydia (Ives) Budington. He graduated from Yale College in 1834. After graduating he taught in the academy in New Canaan, Conn., for nearly a year, and then began a three years' course in the Yale Divinity School. The year 1838-9 he spent as a resident licentiate in the Andover Theological Seminary.

He was ordained pastor of the First Church (Congregational) in Charlestown, Mass, April 22, 1840, and served there for 14 years, until he stepped down in 1854. He assumed at once the pastoral care of the Western Presbyterian Church in Philadelphia, Pa., but the death of his wife and other reasons led him to relinquish this position in the following April, when he removed to the Clinton Avenue Congregational Church in Brooklyn, N. Y., over which he was installed, December 19, 1855. He served in Brooklyn for 23 years. In 1877 he was attacked with cancer of the lip, which after three operations still reappeared, each time in a more troublesome form. He resigned his pastoral office, December 22, 1878, and died in Brooklyn, November 29, 1879, in his 65th year.

He was married, Jan. 5, 1841, to Elizabeth L., daughter of William Gunton, of Washington, D C, who died December 24, 1854. He was again married, April 7, 1857, to Elizabeth W. Nicholson, of Canandaigua, N Y, who survived him. His children, three daughters and two sons by the first marriage, and one son by the second marriage, all survived him.

He published (in 1846) a History of the First Church, Charlestown. He also published several occasional sermons and review-articles.

The degree of D.D. was conferred on him by Amherst College in 1856.
