= Thomas Dacres (younger) =

Thomas Dacres (1609–1668) was an English politician who sat in the House of Commons from 1646 to 1648.

Dacres was the son of Sir Thomas Dacres of Cheshunt, Hertfordshire. He matriculated at Exeter College, Oxford on 16 October 1629, aged 20, and was awarded MA on 12 November 1629, when he was "about to go with his Majesty's ambassador into foreign parts" He was at Lincoln's Inn in 1631. In 1632, he was awarded MA at Cambridge University.

In 1646, Dacres was elected Member of Parliament for Callington in the Long Parliament. He sat until he was excluded under Pride's Purge in 1648.

Dacres was knighted in 1660. He died in 1668.

Parliament of England
Preceded by Sir Arthur Ingram; Hon. George Fane	Member of Parliament for Callington; 1646–1648; With: Lord Clinton	Succeeded by Not represented in Rump Parliament
