= Isaac Johnson (colonist) =

English colonist, one of the founders of Massachusetts

Personal life
- Born: 1601
- Died: 30 September 1630 (aged 28–29)

Religious life
- Church: Church of England

The Reverend Isaac Johnson (1601 – 30 September 1630), an English clergyman, was one of the Puritan founders of Massachusetts and the colony's First Magistrate.

== Family background ==
Baptized at St John's Church, Stamford, in Lincolnshire, the eldest son of Abraham Johnson, he grew up at Fineshade, near North Luffenham in Rutland. His grandfather was Archdeacon Robert Johnson, who founded Oakham and Uppingham Schools in Rutland.

He was educated at Emmanuel College, Cambridge, matriculating 1614, graduating B.A. 1617 and proceeding M.A. 1621; a relative, Laurence Chaderton, was the first Master. He was admitted to Gray's Inn in 1620. Johnson was on 27 May 1621, ordained a priest in the Church of England by Thomas Dove, Bishop of Peterborough.

Archdeacon Johnson settled upon his grandson the manor of Clipsham, Rutland, after his marriage in 1623 to Lady Arbella Clinton, second daughter of Thomas Clinton, 3rd Earl of Lincoln, whose brother, the 4th Earl, was a leading proponent of the Puritan colonisation of America.

== Life ==
Johnson was the main shareholder of the Massachusetts Bay Company and one of the twelve signatories to the Cambridge Agreement on 29 August 1629. In 1630 he sailed with the Winthrop Fleet to America, arriving at Salem on 12 June. He was then one of the four founding patrons of the First Church at Charlestown on 30 July 1630 and provided the land for King's Chapel Burying Ground.

William Blaxton, a contemporary at Emmanuel College, invited Johnson to Shawmut (now Boston), a move for which Blaxton offered to provide the finance. At a Charlestown meeting shortly before he died, Johnson renamed the settlement, previously known as Shawmut or Trimountain (on account of three contiguous hills which appear in a range when viewed from Charlestown), after Boston, Lincolnshire in England where he lived with his wife before emigrating and his friend, John Cotton, was vicar of St Botolph's Church, Boston.

He died at Charlestown on 30 September 1630, the richest man in the Massachusetts Bay Colony. The Eagle, a ship in the Winthrop Fleet, was renamed Arbella after his wife, Arbella Johnson, who predeceased him at Salem by one month.

== See also ==
- New England Colonies
