= Arbella Johnson =

Lady Arbella Johnson
- Born: Arbella Clinton; 3 August 1597; England
- Died: 30 August 1630 (aged 33); Massachusetts Bay Colony
- Other names: Arabella
- Known for: Early settler of Massachusetts Bay Colony; Namesake of ship Arbella; First person described in Nathaniel Hawthorne's Grandfather's Chair
- Spouse: Rev. Isaac Johnson (m. 1623)
- Parents: Thomas Clinton, 3rd Earl of Lincoln (father); Elizabeth (mother)

Lady Arbella Johnson (née Clinton; 3 August 1597 – 30 August 1630) was one of the early settlers of the Massachusetts Bay Colony.

She was the daughter of Thomas Clinton, 3rd Earl of Lincoln, and his wife, Elizabeth. William Allen suggests that she was probably named after Lady Arbella Stuart.

On April 15, 1623, she married Rev. Isaac Johnson. In 1630, they both sailed to Massachusetts on a ship that was named the Arbella after her. She died soon after arriving, while her husband died a month later.

She was described as "lovely in both character and person". Cotton Mather says in his Magnalia Christi Americana that Johnson, "left an earthly paradise in the family of an earldom, to encounter the sorrows of a wilderness, for the entertainments of a pure worship in the house of God; and then immediately left that wilderness for the heavenly paradise, whereto the compassionate Jesus, of whom she was a follower, called her."

On the other hand, William Hubbard said of her:

Coming from a paradise of plenty and pleasure, which she enjoyed in the family of a noble Earldom, into a wilderness of wants, it proved too strong a temptation for her; so that the virtues of her mind were not able to stem the tide of those many adversities of her outward condition, which she, soon after her arrival, saw herself surrounded withal.

Johnson is the first person described in Nathaniel Hawthorne's Grandfather's Chair, which is a collection of tales from American history. Gillian Brown notes that "American history, according to Hawthorne, begins with the story of Lady Arbella Johnson."
