= First Church in Charlestown =

Church in Charlestown, Boston, Massachusetts, U.S.

- First Parish Church in Charlestown
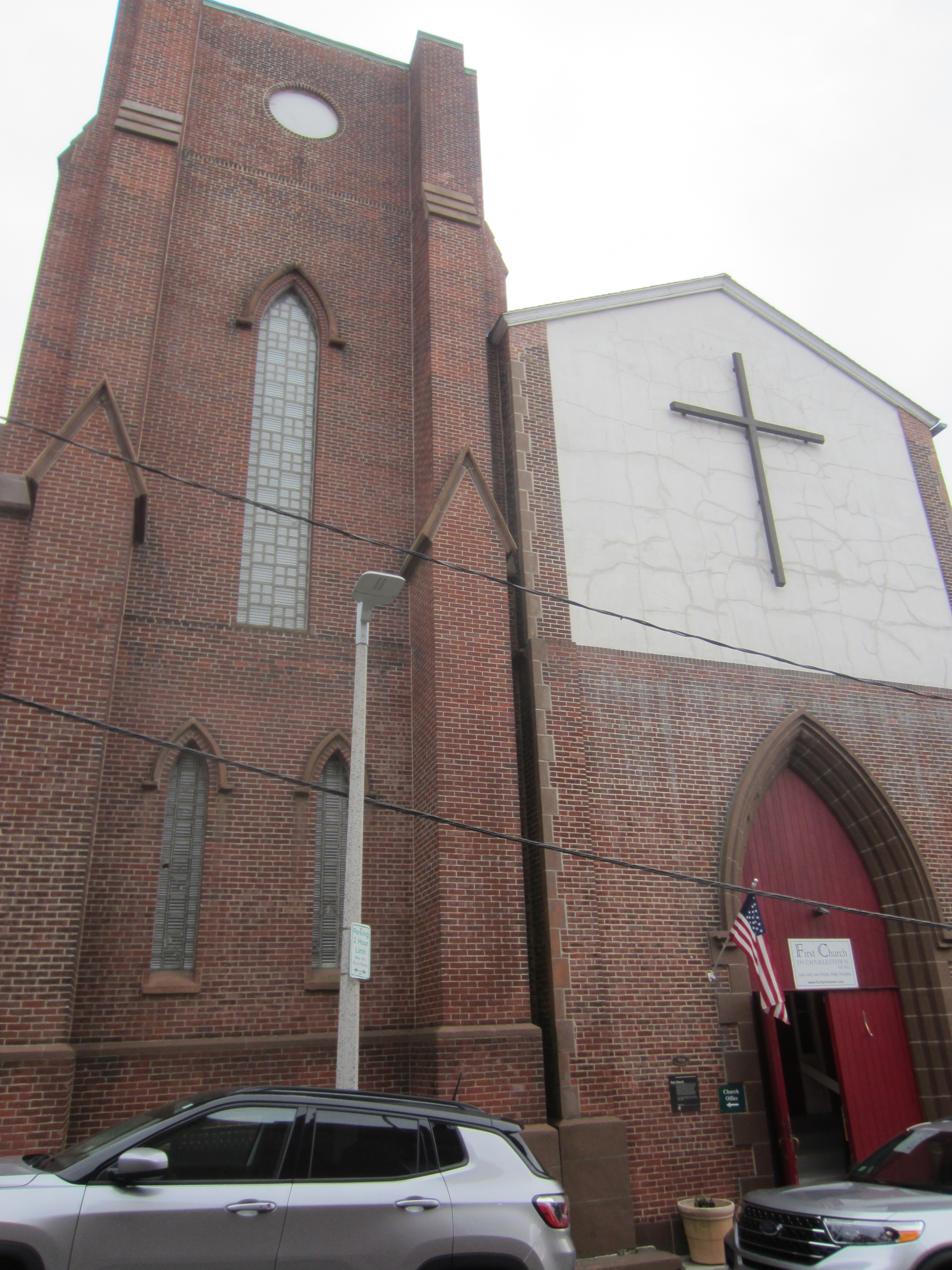
- First Church in Charlestown
- Location: Charlestown, MA
- Country: United States
- Denomination: Southern Baptist Convention
- Website: www.christchurchcharlestown.com

History
- Founded: 1632
- Founder: Thomas James

Architecture
- Style: Gothic
- Years built: 1849

Administration
- Division: Baptist Churches of New England

First Church in Charlestown - now called Christ Church Charlestown - was founded in 1632 in the Charlestown neighborhood of Boston, Massachusetts. Known in the seventeenth century as the Church of Christ at Charlestown, it is one of the six original churches of the Massachusetts Bay Colony and one of the oldest continuously operating churches in the United States. While the church was historically Congregational, it is now part of the Southern Baptist Convention, holding to a conservative view of the Bible and a traditional Reformed view of theology. It is the last church to be pastored by John Harvard, the first benefactor to and namesake of Harvard University.

== History ==
=== 1600s ===
The church was founded in 1632 when the First Church in Boston commissioned 35 of their members to start a new congregation in Charlestown, holding their first worship service on November 12, 1632. For a time, the church held its services in the Great House in the City Square before moving later to a more permanent location on Town Hill and building a church building at that location. The church was later one of six churches that worked together for the creation of Harvard University. The church’s first pastor was Rev. Thomas James, but in 1634 Rev. Zechariah Symmes was installed as pastor and served in that role for the next 37 years. Rev. John Harvard served as an assistant minister to Symmes at the church from 1637-1638 until his death from tuberculosis. Puritan ministers of note in Boston’s history, Rev. Increase Mather and his son Rev. Cotton Mather, were close friends of the Shepherd family, of which Thomas Sr. and Thomas Jr. served as pastors of First Church in the seventeenth century. Commissioning Rev Thomas Thacher to go out from the First Church in Charlestown to serve as their first minister in 1670, the church played a role in the founding of the Old South Church in Boston, MA. The church has a great history of starting new churches and helping new churches get started.

=== 1700s ===
During the First Great Awakening the church twice hosted George Whitefield, whose preaching in Charlestown yielded great numerical results and renewed spiritual fervor. During the earliest days of the American Revolutionary War, in the aftermath of the Battle of Bunker Hill, all of Charlestown including the historic first building of First Church was burned as a result of fires set by a British landing party. A second building was built and completed in 1783 and used until the merger with its daughter church, the Winthrop Church, in 1911. In 1789, the Rev Dr Jedidiah Morse was called as the church's minister, a role in which he served for the next three decades. Rev Morse was both the "father of American geography" and a great minister, serving both the church locally and the greater work of the churches across Boston and throughout New England.

=== 1800s ===
During the first two decades of the nineteenth century, the church's minister, Rev. Dr. Jedidiah Morse, labored to defend and maintain the church's Trinitarian position as the doctrine of Unitarianism spread through the churches around the city. Additionally he contributed to the founding of the Andover Theological Seminary, the organization of the Park Street Church in Boston, the founding of the American Board of Commissioners for Foreign Missions, and the creation of the American Bible Society and the New England Tract Society, which later became the American Tract Society. In 1837, under the leadership of their minister Rev. Warren Fay, the church reached its highest membership, with 271 members. Beginning a numerical decline thereafter, however, the church merged with its daughter congregation, the Winthrop Church, and moved into their facility which is used today as the current home of the church and still shares some of the same architectural design as the original building.

=== 1900s ===
The twentieth century marked a period of great numerical decline in the church's membership, along with other Protestant churches across Charlestown. During these years, the community's churches often talked of merging and consolidating. The First Church building burned in 1957 yet, due to the kind hospitality of the St. John's Episcopal Church in Charlestown, continued to meet until the Green Street church building was repaired and reopened in the months afterward. Collaborating with other churches in the community, the church labored during the Boston desegregation busing crisis to calm tensions and temper the heated response the city's desegregation efforts in the 1970s.

=== 2000s ===
Starting in 2014 the church began a revitalization process together with Celebration Church, a local Brazilian congregation, under the leadership of their pastor Joe Souza. Celebration Church provided spiritual fervor and great enthusiasm, a renewed presence serving the Charlestown community, ministerial care for the aging congregation of First Church, and a major financial investment in refurbishing the facility.

Historically, First Church had been a Congregational church; upon the installation of Rev. Erik Maloy in 2015, the church also became a member of the Southern Baptist Convention through its affiliation with the Baptist Convention of New England. The church also became part of The Gospel Coalition and 9 Marks networks, as well as one of the cohort churches in Overseed, an organization dedicated to reviving historic New England churches, by returning them to a Gospel preaching view of theology.

By 2022, coming out of the COVID-19 pandemic, the congregation's membership had declined significantly and was in danger of closing when Rev. Maloy resigned as pastor. That year, however, the church merged with Christ Church Charlestown, a new congregation started in 2017. The church legally remains the First Church in Charlestown, doing business as Christ Church Charlestown - a near-return to the name by which it would have been called in the seventeenth century, the Church of Christ at Charlestown.

At its height in 1837, the church had 271 members. In 2015, shortly after Celebration Church moved in to help revitalize the congregation, it had declined to just 15 members. The church, however, is growing again with increased numerical attendance in worship and covenant membership, along with a restoration of the church's facilities, its historic vision for starting new churches, and a joyful and grateful presence in serving the Charlestown community. The church has restored its 1632 covenant for membership, and while it is an interdenominational congregation with Baptist affiliations, the members have returned to a Congregational polity and doctrinal convictions closely aligned with the Puritans who founded the church in 1632.

== Design ==
The church building's current design is similar in size to the Gothic Cathedral built by the Winthrop Church in 1849. The fire in the 1950s caused the interior of the church to go through an extensive redesign, a more humble and modest space than the one that came before it. As the fire and rebuild happened during a time of numerical decline for the First Church, the restoration and much of its financing came through the generous giving and labors of church membership with the help of the Charlestown community. The balconies that once surrounded the sanctuary were taken down and parts of the lower floor were enclosed to create Sunday School classrooms.

== Pastors ==
1. Thomas James (1632-1636)
2. Zechariah Symmes (1634-1671)
3. John Harvard (1637-1638)
4. Thomas Allen (nonconformist) (1639-1651)
5. Thomas Shepard (minister) (1659-1677)
6. Thomas Shepard Jr.(1680-1685)
7. Charles Morton (educator) (1686-1698)
8. Simon Bradstreet (1698-1741)
9. Joseph Stevens (1713-1721)
10. Hull Abbot (1724-1774)
11. Thomas Pretince (1739-1782)
12. Joshua Paine (1787-1788)
13. Jedidiah Morse (1789-1819)
14. Warren Fay (1819-1840)
15. William Ives Budington (1840-1854)
16. James B. Miles (1855-1867)
17. Benjamin W. Pond (1867-1871)
18. F.F. Ford (1872-1874)
19. Henry L. Kendall (1776-1879)
20. George W. Brooks (1883-1889)
21. William G. Schoppe (1890-1893)
22. Charles F. Crathern (1893-1896)
23. Charles H. Pope (1896-1901)
24. Peter McQueen (1901-1907)
25. James McD. Blue (1907-1912)
26. Charles H. Talmage (1914-1923)
27. Thomas W. Davison (1925-1944)
28. Thomas W. Kidd (1947-1954)
29. William A. Burnett (1956-1973)
30. Charles Harrah(1973-1978)
31. Victor Ford (1978-2000)
32. Christine Jaronski (2000-2008)
33. Erik Maloy (2015–2022)
34. J.D. Mangrum (2022–Present)
