= Bridget Clinton, Countess of Lincoln =

English noblewoman

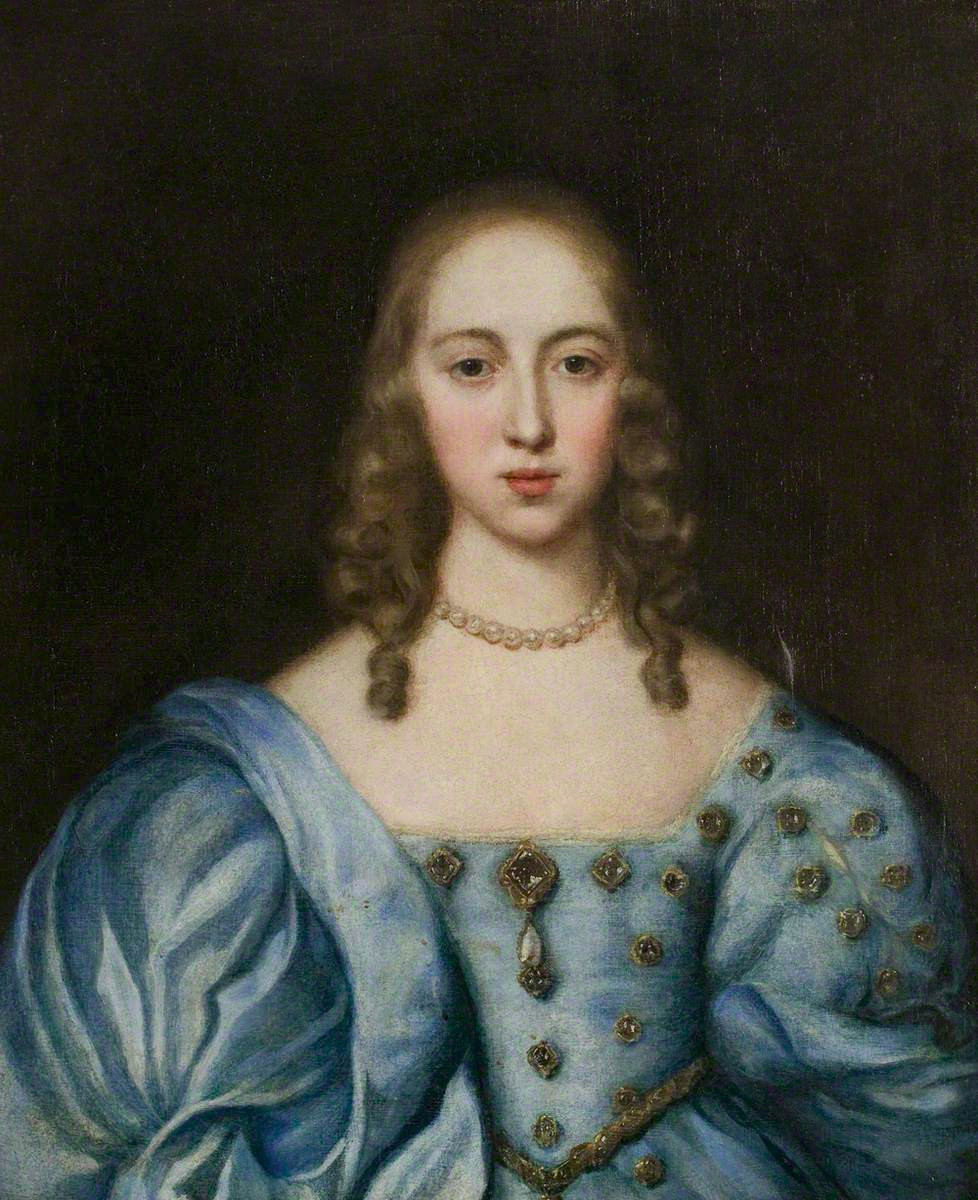
Bridget Clinton, by an unknown artist

Bridget Clinton, Countess of Lincoln, formerly Bridget Fiennes, was an English noblewoman, who became Countess of Lincoln in 1619.

She was the daughter of William Fiennes, 1st Viscount Saye and Sele, and his wife, the former Elizabeth Temple. She married Theophilus Clinton, 4th Earl of Lincoln, some time before 1619, and their children were:

- Lady Catharine Clinton (died c.1643), who married George Booth, 1st Baron Delamer of Dunham Massey, and had one child
- Lady Arabella Clinton (died 1667), who married Robert Rolle and had children
- Margaret Clinton (died 1688), who married Hugh Boscawen and had children
- Edward Clinton, Lord Clinton (1624-1657), who married Lady Anne Holles and had one child, Edward Clinton, 5th Earl of Lincoln

In 1622, her mother-in-law's book, The Countess of Lincoln's Nursery, was dedicated to her. It praised the young countess for opting to breast-feed her own children.

Thomas Dudley, who as the earl's steward had been involved in arranging her marriage to Clinton, wrote to her in 1631, reporting on the experiences of settlers in New England, indicating that she was a popular figure with emigrants from Lincolnshire.

After Bridget's death, the earl married a second time, to the widow Elizabeth Gorges, who was a relation of his, but they had no children.
