= Richard Saltonstall =

English diplomat (1586–1661)

Sir Richard Saltonstall
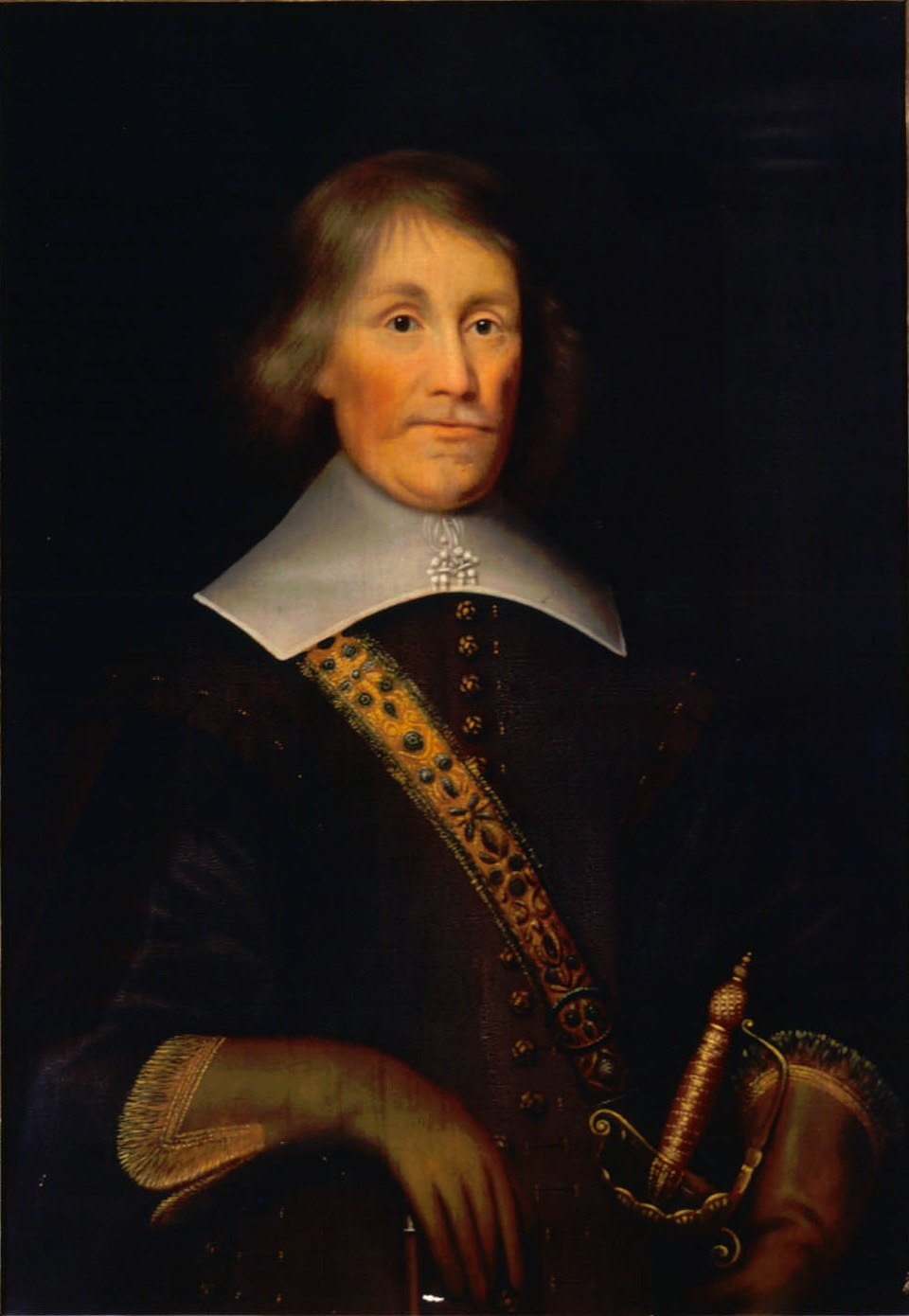
- Posthumous portrait by Charles Osgood, c. 1858
- Born: 4 April 1586; Halifax, West Yorkshire, England
- Died: October 1661 (aged 75); England

Signature
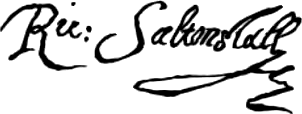

Sir Richard Saltonstall (baptised, 4 April 1586 – October 1661) led a group of English settlers up the Charles River to settle in what is now Watertown, Massachusetts in 1630.

He was a nephew of the Lord Mayor of London Richard Saltonstall (1517–1600), and was admitted pensioner at Clare College, Cambridge, in 1603. Before leaving England for North America, he served as a Justice of the Peace for the West Riding of Yorkshire and was Lord of the Manor of Ledsham, which he got from the Harebreds and later sold to the Earl of Strafford.

== Family ==
Coat of Arms of Richard Saltonstall

Sir Richard Saltonstall was the eldest of the eleven children of Samuel Saltonstall and Anne, born Ramsden.

Sir Richard married his first wife, Grace Kaye, around 1609; their children were named Richard, Rosamond, Grace, Robert, Samuel, and Henry. After Grace died in 1625, Sir Richard married Lady Elizabeth West, with whom he had daughter Anne and son John.

Although Saltonstall remained in Massachusetts only briefly, his descendants played a major role in New England history. Amongst others, Sir Richard's son Henry was graduated in the first class at Harvard in 1642.

== Early life ==
Saltonstall was admitted as a pensioner at Clare College in 1603 and, fifteen years later, was knighted on 23 November 1618. He served as justice of the peace in the West Riding of Yorkshire in 1625–1626 and was Lord of the Manor at Ledsham.

== Massachusetts Bay Colony ==
Sir Richard became involved with the Massachusetts Bay Company in 1629, signing the original charter of Massachusetts, and was named to the emigrant committee and appointed first assistant to Governor John Winthrop. After the death of his first wife, he sold his land in England and set sail for New England with his family. They boarded the Arbella in April 1630 at Yarmouth, off of the southern coast of England, with the Winthrop company and arrived in Salem, Massachusetts on 12 June 1630.

=== Saltonstall Plantation ===
Shortly after his arrival in New England, Sir Richard led a small party of planters, including Rev. George Phillips, up the Charles River on the Arbella. They brought several servants and cattle on the trip to establish the Saltonstall Plantation at present day Watertown. On 30 July 1630, the group of about 40 men at the Saltonstall Plantation entered into a "liberal church covenant". He was soon appointed magistrate and justice of the peace.

Despite a land grant of over 580 acres, Saltonstall decided to leave the colony because of the harsh winter. On 29 March 1631, Sir Richard and his family, less two sons, travelled to Boston where they lodged at Governor Winthrop's house. The next morning they set sail for England.

== Life in Europe ==
Sir Richard Saltonstall settled in London and remained involved with colonial affairs. In a letter to two leaders of the Boston church, Saltonstall expressed his disapproval of their hypocritical punishments and religious persecutions.

=== Connecticut Colony ===
In 1631, Sir Richard, and several other English gentlemen and lords, were granted a patent of Connecticut by the Plymouth Council in England. The patentees appointed John Winthrop as governor and commissioned him to construct a fort at the mouth of the Connecticut River. In 1635, he organized and funded a party of over 20 men, led by Francis Stiles, to prepare a settlement in Connecticut for the arrival of the patentees. This claim was heavily disputed and resulted in severe financial losses for Saltonstall.

=== Domestic service ===
In 1644, Saltonstall was appointed ambassador to Holland. His portrait was painted there. Once thought to be by Rembrandt., the portrait is now attributed to Abraham de Vries. In 1649, he, among others, was commissioned by parliament for the trial of the Duke of Hamilton, Lord Capel, and the Earl of Holland, for high treason.

=== Wales ===
Sir Richard Saltonstall appears to have been in Newtown, Montgomeryshire (Powys), Wales at the Restoration of King Charles II in 1660. On 18 July 1660 the Council of King Charles II issued an order to Sir Matthew Price, High Sheriff of Montgomeryshire to take into safe custody Vavasour Powell (described as, "a most factious and dangerous minister"), Sir Richard Saltonstall, and Richard Price of Aberbechan.

According to Sir Matthew Price's letters to Secretary Sir Edward Nicholas, Vavasour Powell, Sir Richard Saltonstall and Richard Price were concerned in a plot to depose King Charles II. Letters were found in their possession indicating the plot extended all the way to London. By 2 August 1660 Vavasour Powell was taken into custody, while Sir Richard Saltonstall and Capt. Richard Price "had left these parts" [Montgomeryshire].

== Legacy ==
There are several monuments dedicated to Saltonstall in Watertown. These include Saltonstall Park on Main Street, Watertown, Sir Richard's Landing (later to be renamed Gerry's Landing), and the Saltonstall Founders Memorial near the Charles River.

There is a small granite monument commemorating their settlement close to the Mt. Auburn Bridge in Cambridge, Massachusetts.

== See also ==
- Roger Conant
