= John Humphrey (Massachusetts colonist) =

2nd Deputy Governor of the Massachusetts Bay Colony
- In office 1629–1630
- Preceded by: Thomas Goffe
- Succeeded by: Thomas Dudley

Personal details
- Born: c. 1597
- Died: December 19th, 1661

John Humphrey (also spelled Humfrey or Humfry, c. 1597 – 1661) was an English Puritan and an early funder of the English colonisation of North America. He was the treasurer of the Dorchester Company, which established an unsuccessful settlement on Massachusetts Bay in the 1620s, and was deputy governor of the Massachusetts Bay Company from 1629 to 1630. He came to Massachusetts in 1634, where he served as a magistrate and was the first sergeant major general of the Ancient and Honorable Artillery Company. He became involved in English attempts to settle Providencia Island in the late 1630s, and returned to England in 1641 after financial reverses and probable religious differences with other members of the Massachusetts ruling elite. He then became involved in an attempt to settle The Bahamas in the late 1640s, and had some involvement in the politics of the English Civil War.

Children that Humphrey and his wife left in Massachusetts had an unhappy fate, and the Humphreys were criticised at the time for leaving them. Three daughters were subjected to physical and sexual abuse, and only one of them survived to adulthood. The Massachusetts leadership did little to prosecute offenders, and some saw this mistreatment as a form a divine punishment of the Humphreys for their actions in abandoning the Massachusetts colony.

== Early life and family ==
Coat of Arms of John Humphrey

John Humphrey was born in the mid-1590s, probably in the English County of Dorset. The exact date of his birth is uncertain: no histories give precise dates, and estimated dates differ, but are roughly clustered around 1595. His father, Michael Humphrey, was steward at an estate in Dorset. Humphrey was educated at Trinity College, Cambridge, and studied law at Lincoln's Inn in 1615. He settled in Dorchester, Dorset, where he was a member of John White's church.

Humphrey was married at least three times.

- His first wife was Isabel Williams, daughter of Bruen and Elizabeth (Churchill) Williams, who died before 1621.
- He married (2nd) Elizabeth Pelham on 4 September 1621 at St. Thomas, Salisbury, Wiltshire. She died at Dorchester on November 1, 1628. Three children were born to Col. John Humphrey and Elizabeth at Fordington, Dorsetshire:
  - John Humphrey Jr., born August 11, 1622. Named administrator of father's estate on June 4, 1653
  - Elizabeth Humphrey, born November 23, 1623
  - Anne Humphrey, born December 17, 1625. m (1st) William Palmes about 1642. M (2nd) Rev John Myles in Swansea, Wales. They immigrated to Swansea, Mass after the restoration of Charles II around 1662. On January 15, 1680, as the only surviving child of John Humphrey, she appointed her son-in-law Griffin Edwards of Boston, as administrator of the estate of John Humphrey in the colony of Massachusetts.
- In about 1632, Humphrey married his 3rd wife, Lady Susan Clinton (Fiennes), daughter of Thomas Clinton (Fiennes), Earl of Lincoln. Children by this marriage:
  - Dorcus Humphrey b. abt 1633 in England.
  - Sarah Humphrey b. abt 1635 in England.
  - Theophilus Humphrey b, Salem Jan 24, 1636/7.
  - Thomas, baptized 26 Aug 1638 at Salem.
  - Joseph Humphrey b. Salem 5 Apr 1640. Was killed Lisbon, Portugal abt 1669, unmarried, no offspring.
  - Lydia, b. just before Jan 28, 1640/1; d. 25 Apr 1641 at Salem.

== Establishment of the Massachusetts Bay Company ==
Humphrey and White became involved in a variety of plans for migration to North America. In the early 1620s Humphrey served as treasurer of the Dorchester Company, an early effort spearheaded by White to colonise Massachusetts Bay. This colonisation effort failed in 1625 due to a lack of funding.

Humphrey and White persisted in efforts to establish a successful colony. While White sought new sources of funding in London, Humphrey circulated in the Puritan circle of his brother-in-law the Earl of Clinton. White succeeded in interesting new investors, under whose auspices the Massachusetts Bay Company was established in 1628. The company acquired a grant from the Plymouth Council for New England for land roughly between the Charles and Merrimack Rivers. Humphrey also invested in this company and served as its treasurer. A number of Clinton's associates, notably John Winthrop, Thomas Dudley, Richard Bellingham, and Simon Bradstreet, were also drawn to the idea of migration to North America. In 1629 the company received a royal charter, and Humphrey was elected its deputy governor, under Winthrop.

== Massachusetts ==
He was unable to accompany Governor Winthrop on the 1630 fleet that brought the first large-scale migration to Massachusetts, and was consequently replaced by Thomas Dudley as deputy governor shortly before the fleet sailed. He remained actively involved in the Company in London, and assisted in defending its charter against attacks levied by Sir Ferdinando Gorges in 1633. He eventually arrived at the colony in 1634 with his second wife and children, and immediately became involved in the administration of the colony. He had been granted land in what is now Swampscott, Massachusetts, and was regularly elected one of the colony's assistants despite his absence. In 1637 he sat on the tribunal that resulted in the banishment of Anne Hutchinson.

Possibly dissatisfied with the religiously intolerant nature of the Massachusetts government, Humphrey became involved in a scheme headed by Lord Say and Sele to colonise Providencia Island in the Caribbean. His attempts to influence Massachusetts residents to migrate there did not sit well with other Massachusetts leaders, who disagreed with his relatively tolerant views on religion. In 1640 Lord Say and Sele offered, and Humphreys accepted, appointment as governor of the Providence Island colony. A ship of colonists he sent there from New England arrived in 1641 to find the island in Spanish hands, and was forced to return.

== Providence Island and Bahamas ==
Unhappy with the state of affairs in Massachusetts, Humphreys and his wife left the colony in late 1641 for England. Humphreys aligned himself with the Independent faction associated with Henry Vane the Younger and others during the English Civil War. In the late 1640s he became involved in an attempt to establish a more religiously tolerant colony in The Bahamas; the colonisation attempt failed due to a shipwreck and political-religious differences. Humphreys died in England in 1651.

== Fate of children ==
With his second wife he had six children that remained in New England; he also appears to have had a son by his first wife. The children he left in Massachusetts ended not being well cared for, and three daughters were subjected to physical and sexual abuse.

== Legacy ==
A house supposedly built for him still stands in Swampscott and is known as the John Humphreys House (sic); it is one of the oldest wooden houses in the United States.
