= Hedrick (surname) =

Hedrick is a surname. Notable people with the name include:

- Brandon Hedrick (1979–2006), convicted murderer executed by Virginia
- Chad Hedrick (born 1977), American inline speed skater and ice speed skater
- Charles W. Hedrick (born 1934), American scholar
- Christopher Hedrick (born 1962), American entrepreneur, business executive and public servant
- Clinton M. Hedrick (1918–1945), United States Army soldier and recipient of the Medal of Honor
- E. H. Hedrick (1894–1954), American Democratic politician from West Virginia
- Earle Raymond Hedrick (1876–1943), American mathematician and a vice-president of the University of California
- Granville Hedrick (1814–1881), American leader in the Latter Day Saint movement
- J. Karl Hedrick (1944–2017), American controls researcher
- Larry Hedrick (1940–2020), American businessman and former NASCAR team owner
- Philip Hedrick (born 1942), American population geneticist and conservation biologist
- Todd Hedrick (born 1978), American philosopher
- Ulysses Prentiss Hedrick (1870–1951), American botanist and horticulturist
- Wally Hedrick (1928–2003), American artist in the 1950s California counterculture
- Wilbur Olin Hedrick (1868–1954), American economist
- Wyatt C. Hedrick (1888–1964), American architect, engineer, and developer

== See also ==
- Hedrick (disambiguation)
