= Snowicane =

Snowicane may refer to:

- 1804 New England hurricane
- February 25–27, 2010 North American blizzard
- 2011 Bering Sea superstorm
