= Endicott Pear Tree =

Oldest living cultivated fruit tree in North America

Coordinates: 42°32′54″N 70°55′48″W

'Endicott' pear
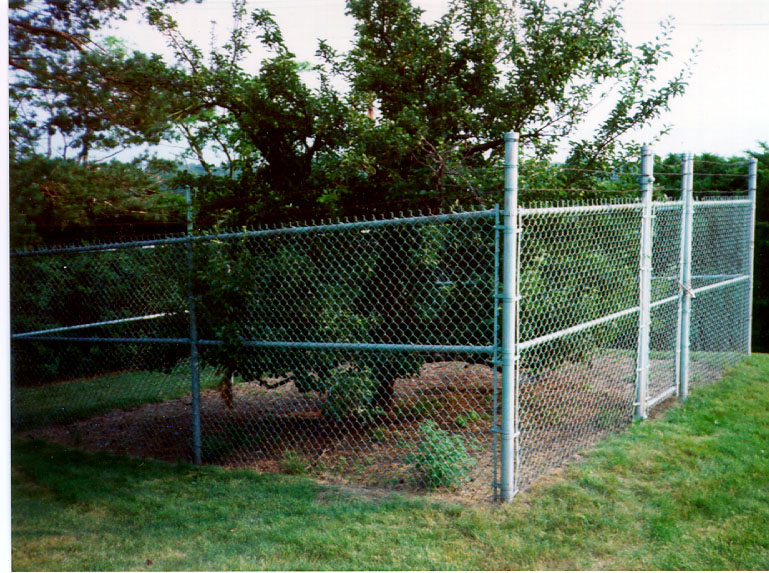
- The Endicott Pear Tree in 1997
- Genus: Pyrus
- Species: Pyrus communis
- Cultivar: 'Endicott'

The Endicott Pear Tree, also known as the Endecott Pear, is a European Pear (Pyrus communis) tree, located in Danvers, Essex County, Massachusetts. It is believed to be the oldest living cultivated fruit tree in North America.

== History ==
=== Early history ===
John Endecott, governor of the Massachusetts Bay Colony, was probably among the first to cultivate fruit in the Colony, and imported the Endecott Pear Tree from England.

The Endicott Pear Tree was planted in its current location between 1628 and 1639 (William Bentley reports dates of 1630, 1631, and 1639 in his diary) by John Endecott—a governor of the Massachusetts Bay Colony, one of the Colony's earliest settlers, and was probably brought from England on the Arbella in June 1630. Various reports indicate an alternate import year of 1628.

Tradition holds to the notion that the tree was planted by Endecott himself, according to Harriet Tapley in Chronicles of Danvers and to Judge Alden Perley White. According to Charles S. Tapley, a President of the Bay State Historical League, White recounted that Endecott personally planted the pear tree in the presence of his children and farmworkers and reportedly declared: "I hope the tree will love the soil of the old world and no doubt when we have gone the tree will still be alive."

The 1925 USDA Agriculture Yearbook, citing the memoir of Samuel Endicott—a descendant of Endecott (the spelling of the family name changed in the 18th century)—suggests that the tree may have been transplanted from Endecott's garden in Salem. An article in the Salem Observer, written in 1852 by Samuel P. Fowler, lends further credence to this idea, noting that it was in Salem proper that Endecott "probably planted his famous pear tree". Flower also reports that Endecott was probably among the first to cultivate fruit in the Massachusetts Bay Colony.

=== 19th century ===
The diary of Rev. William Bentley, who visited the Endecott estate (at the time known as Collins Farm and owned by Capt. John Endicott) on several occasions, makes numerous mentions of the Endicott Pear Tree starting in 1800. Bentley's diary confirms that the tree regularly produced fruit. In September 1809, Bentley passed along some pears harvested from the tree to former President John Adams; he received a letter from Adams concerning the pears the following month. On April 11, 1810, Bentley visited Collins Farm to obtain twigs from the pear tree to send to Adams. Thurl D. Brown, in a lecture before the Danvers Historical Society, suggested that "[t]he twigs must have taken hold", citing a letter from Adams dated September 24, 1815 that noted: "The hurricane of yesterday has covered the ground about me with pears."

The Endicott Pear Tree was damaged by the Storm of October 1804, a late-season major hurricane in the 1804 Atlantic hurricane season, but recovered to "yield many bushels" of fruit. The tree was damaged by hurricanes at least twice more in the 19th century: in 1815 and 1843. By 1875, the Endicott Pear Tree stood at approximately 80 ft (24 m). Sometime in the mid-to-late-19th century, a wooden fence was erected to protect the tree.

=== 20th century ===
In the early 20th century, Ulysses Prentiss Hedrick, a botanist and author of The Pears of New York—a 1921 monograph belonging to a series of publications on fruits, "all of which have become classic references on the fruit cultivars of the period"—confirmed that the Endicott Pear Tree had not been grafted, as was suggested in an 1837 article about the tree in Mr. Hovey's Magazine.

A 1919 account of the Endicott Pear Tree by James Raymond Simmons, author of The Historic Trees of Massachusetts, describes the tree as follows:

Soil has gradually collected about the trunk until the two main branches appear to rise from the ground as separate trees. They evidently join under a heavy covering of sod. Surrounding them is a fence which acts as an effective protection. When the author photographed the tree it was covered in green fruit. It may be seen in a field near Endicott street at Davensport, and is worth turning aside to behold, for it is one of the most quaint and strangely impressive of all the historic trees.

— James Raymond Simmons, The Historic Trees of Massachusetts (1919)

The Endicott Pear Tree was damaged by a hurricane once more in 1934. In the 1940s, The National Grange of the Order of Patrons of Husbandry attempted to acquire possession of the tree from its then-owner, a Mr. Simard, who had acquired the property from George Endicott in 1941. This move was prompted by the discovery that Simard had "stripped the soil near the tree", leaving it exposed. In 1946, at a town meeting, the town of Danvers passed a resolution to "accept a plot of land on which the so-called Endicott Pear Tree is located, subject to an agreement drawn by the owner and in form agreeable to the Town Counsel"; however, the town did not purchase the tree due to the inability of the Town Counsel, a James H. Sullivan, and Simard to agree on the terms of the acquisition. On January 1, 1947, Sullivan was replaced as Town Counsel, and no further action was taken regarding acquisition of the Endicott Pear Tree. Eventually, Simard deeded the property on which the tree is located to North Shore Industries; it was subsequently transferred to CBS-Hytron, which erected a wooden fence around the pear tree, Matchlett Laboratories, and finally Osram Sylvania.

On July 27, 1964, vandals cut off the tree's branches and all but 6 ft (1.8 m) of its trunk using hacksaws. By 1965, it was surrounded by a chain-link fence and located near the headquarters of Osram Sylvania in Danvers.

In 1997, scions were collected from the Endicott Pear Tree for the pear germplasm collection of the National Clonal Germplasm Repository in Corvallis, Oregon, and a fruit-bearing clone of the tree was grown.

=== 21st century ===
Local interest in the Endicott Pear Tree was renewed, after the property was acquired in 2004 by the North Shore Medical Center and a new ambulatory care center for Massachusetts General Hospital was constructed, further encroaching on the tree. Danvers Historical Society, the Danvers Preservation Commission and Richard B. Trask of the Peabody Institute Library presented a list of conservation concerns regarding the tree to the North Shore Medical Center. In response, the Medical Center replaced the chain link fence with a wrought iron fence and hired a tree care service on retainer. Danvers's Tree and Grounds Department also began assisting in the maintaining the tree.

Thereafter, the Endecott-Endicott Family Association, Gov. John Endecott Chapter of the National Society of the Colonial Dames of America and the Essex National Heritage Commission began promoting the tree's history and preservation. In 2009, a permanent display was installed in the lobby of the Medical Center. Preservation efforts culminated in 2011 with the installation of a historic marker by the Gov. John Endecott Chapter of the NSCDA in the Medical Center's parking lot near the tree.

== Cultural impacts ==
According to a 2007 article in the Danvers Herald, the Endicott Pear Tree "holds a special place in the hearts of many Danversites". In 2004, the Danvers Preservation Commission sought to have the tree featured on a stamp of the United States Postal Service.

Lucy Larcom composed a poem, titled "The Governor's Tree", about the Endicott Pear Tree in 1890 for Arbor Day.

== See also ==
- List of oldest trees
- List of individual trees
