= 1804 New England hurricane =

Category 2 Atlantic hurricane in 1804

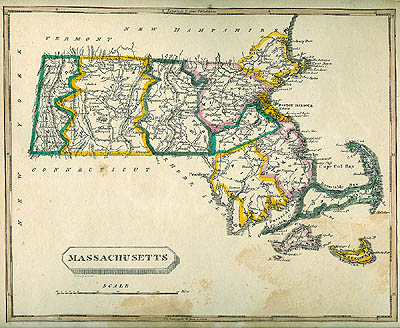
- Map of Massachusetts at the time of the 1804 hurricane

Meteorological history
- Formed: October 4, 1804
- Extratropical: October 10, 1804
- Dissipated: October 11, 1804

Category 2 hurricane
- 1-minute sustained (SSHWS/NWS)
- Highest winds: 110 mph (175 km/h)
- Lowest pressure: 977 mbar (hPa); 28.85 inHg

Overall effects
- Fatalities: 16 direct
- Damage: $100,000 (1804 USD)
- Areas affected: Caribbean Sea, South Carolina, Virginia, Mid-Atlantic States, New England, and southeastern Canada
- Part of the 1804 Atlantic hurricane and 1804–05 North American winter season

The 1804 New England hurricane (also known as the Storm of October 1804) was the first tropical cyclone in recorded history known to have produced snowfall. (Note: There have been several subsequent Atlantic "snow hurricanes": Hurricane Ginny (1963), Hurricane Noel (2007), Hurricane Sandy (2012), Hurricane Zeta (2020), and Hurricane Larry (2021).) An unusual late-season storm in 1804, it yielded vast amounts of snow, rain, and powerful winds across the northeastern United States. Prior to its approach towards the East Coast of the United States, it passed through the Caribbean Sea on October 4, and later emerged near Georgetown, South Carolina. By early on October 9, a trough near the Virginia Capes turned the disturbance toward New England. Soon thereafter, the hurricane's abundant moisture clashed with an influx of cold Canadian air, leading to the deepening of the resulting pressure gradient and provoking inland intensification. While situated over Massachusetts, it attained its peak intensity of 110 mph (175 km/h), undergoing an extratropical transition. Even as it drifted towards the Canadian maritimes, consequently gradually weakening, precipitation persisted for another two days before the snowstorm finally subsided on October 11.

Due to its unusual nature, both heavy snowfall and strong winds caused a swath of devastation stretching from the Mid-Atlantic states to northern New England. In the Middle-Atlantic region, moderate damage occurred at sea but little was noted inland. In New England, strong gusts inflicted significant damage to numerous churches. Widespread residential damage, in contrast, was mostly negligible and had no lasting consequences. Thousands of trees were knocked over, obstructing roads and fiscally damaging the timber industry throughout the region. Cold temperatures, wet snow, and high winds downed numerous branches in fruit orchards, froze potato crops, flattened dozens of barns, and killed over a hundred cattle. In general, the agriculture, shipping, timber, and livestock trades suffered most acutely following the passage of the hurricane, while structural damage was widespread but generally inconsequential.

The storm's most severe effects were concentrated at sea and led to a majority of the hurricane's deaths. Winds swept dozens of watercraft and multiple ships ashore, while high waters capsized many others. Several wharves were destroyed, subsequently harming local shipping businesses. Snow and rainfall totals varied widely between states, with a clear delineation between areas that received frozen precipitation and rainfall in the Northeast. Areas of Massachusetts received up to 7 in (18 cm) of rain, in contrast to snow totals upward of 48 in (120 cm) measured in Vermont. In all, the hurricane caused more than 15 deaths at sea and one inland, and also resulted in at least $100,000 (1804 USD) in damage. (Note: All damage figures in the article are in 1804 United States dollars (USD) unless otherwise stated.) The hurricane of 1804, generally described as the most severe storm in the United States since the Great Colonial Hurricane of 1635 nearly 200 years earlier, set several major precedents which have only infrequently been replicated since. It was the first known tropical cyclone to generate snowfall, and its early and extensive accumulations throughout New England were not only unprecedented but unusually heavy.

== Meteorological history ==
The origins of the hurricane prior to its approach near New England are mostly unknown. A modern study conducted in 2006 traced its origins to north of Puerto Rico on October 4, 1804, and reports indicated it also passed by Dominique and Guadaloupe on the same day. Little else was known about the storm until its approach towards the East Coast of the United States and transit near South Carolina. Weather historian David Ludlum concluded that both the hurricane's strength and its abnormally cold environment were derived from the influx of unseasonably cold air from the north converging upon the storm's abundant moisture, increasing the pressure gradient and leading to intensification. He also speculated that the storm could have formed non-tropically from the southern Appalachian Mountains before arriving on the Atlantic coast, but given meteorological circumstances, characteristics, and timing, it was evaluated that the storm was of tropical origin. The earliest evidence of a disturbance near the United States was noted on October 8, when rainfall was recorded in upstate New York, precipitated by the storm's western periphery, in advance of an approaching trough. The following morning, the trough's motion near the Virginia Capes area was accompanied by intensifying winds and a change in their direction; initially southwesterly at force 3 (retroactively estimated based on the Beaufort scale, which was devised in 1805), the incoming gale's winds rapidly turned towards the west-northwest, escalating to force 6 by the afternoon. A 2001 study noted the unusual orientation of the storm's winds; although a majority of New England hurricanes induced southeasterly gusts, the 1804 hurricane's, in contrast, were mostly southwesterly.

Historical records chronicled the remainder of the storm's track along the East Coast of the United States. A "dreadful squall" occurred near Cape Henry at noon on October 9, and historical documents confirm it quickly reached Chesapeake Bay later that morning, maintaining west-to-north winds. While gusts in New York City, where the storm arrived that afternoon, initially blew towards the southeast, they soon shifted towards the north-northwest and coincided with a rapid drop in atmospheric pressure, which bottomed out at 977 mbar (28.87 inHg) by the early afternoon. Though the barometer at the weather station remained at that point for much of the afternoon, the air temperature plummeted rapidly from 55 °F (13 °C) to 42 °F (6 °C) during the same period. A strong westerly circulation encouraged the swift eastward movement of the trough's northern segment, steering the track of the storm northeastward over New England. By the evening, the storm had fully traversed the northeastern United States, where accounts indicated the passage of the storm's eye. The results of the 2001 study also suggested atypical strengthening occurred around this time, achieving its peak intensity with 1-minute maximum sustained winds of 110 mph (175 km/h) over Massachusetts, equivalent to a Category 2 hurricane on the Saffir–Simpson hurricane wind scale. The storm's maximum diameter was estimated to be 90 mi (150 km) at its largest point. As the hurricane weakened throughout the night, it underwent an extratropical transition, evidenced by a passageway of weak winds off of the trough's center. Its eye was consequently distorted as it meandered northward towards Canada, where it subsequently encountered an area of high pressure; though gusts diminished that evening, moderate precipitation persisted for another two days, before the snowstorm finally departed on October 11.

== Impact and records ==
The hurricane brought strong gusts, copious snow, and heavy rain throughout New England and across the Mid-Atlantic region. High precipitation amounts were observed along the storm's trajectory, peaking at 7 in (180 mm) inches of rain in Salem, Massachusetts and 48 in (120 cm) of snow at Windsor, Vermont. It was the first known tropical cyclone to feature frozen precipitation, and remained the only instance until a later disturbance in 1841 and Hurricane Ginny in 1963, which triggered 13 in (33 cm) of snow in regions of northern and central Maine. The unusually widespread and severe October snow was seen few times – if ever – until the 2011 Halloween nor'easter, which dropped several feet in New England at its worst. Similarly, Hurricane Sandy in 2012 brought heavy snow along areas of the East Coast, with its highest depths concentrated in Virginia, albeit while exhibiting extratropical characteristics. In addition, a modern survey concluded that the 1804 storm was the only known hurricane to strike New England with southwesterly winds, and it was also one of only two, the other being the 1869 Saxby Gale, confirmed to have intensified while inland over New England.

In the Middle-Atlantic states, it caused little injury overall, though many boats and ships were capsized. To the north in New England, many churches endured significant damage, and shipwrecks led to 15 deaths, with one other death owing to a building collapse. Due to intense gusts, hundreds of trees were uprooted and many buildings were unroofed. Agriculture, shipping, timber, and livestock industries also suffered substantial impairment, with considerable injury experienced by barns, crops, watercraft, timber, and livestock. Farther north, entire swaths of forest were leveled, and heavy snow blocked roads, paths, and turnpikes. Fruit orchards and sugar groves endured the worst of the storm, reducing the season's harvests. Private properties generally suffered damage to roofs, windows, and chimneys; several buildings throughout the region were reported to have collapsed. Overall, approximately $100,000 in damage and more than 16 deaths were recorded. (Note: Deaths were totaled as follows: one due to a house collapse in Boston, one due to a ship capsizing in Boston, seven due to the sinking of the Dove, one due to the grounding of the Hannah, one as a result of the destruction of the Protector, three due to presumed drowning at Plymouth, one offshore Rye Beach, and one to the wrecking of the Amity. A number of individuals died upon the John Harris; however, no specific number is known.)

=== Mid-Atlantic and south ===
Though the hurricane was reported to have passed by Dominique, Guadaloupe, and Georgetown, South Carolina, few other details are known and no damage was observed. Losses in the Mid-Atlantic states were much less severe than those in New England, but isolated damage was still noted. Offshore Cape Henry, Virginia, a vessel weathered through a squall, but managed to escape without being capsized. To the north near Chesapeake Bay, a mail boat was impeded by unrelenting west-to-northwesterly gusts at Havre de Grace, Maryland, and consequently was unable to traverse the bay. A negative storm tide at Baltimore grounded multiple boats, and farther north at Philadelphia, an arriving ferry was inundated by a sudden gale. In New Jersey, a ferry was overturned near Trenton, and another ran ashore within the proximity of Absecon Beach. The hurricane's impact in New York state was largely insignificant, though rain totals reached 2.27 in (58 mm) in New York City. Meanwhile, to the west in the Catskill Mountains, up to 18 in (46 cm) of snow accumulated, despite reports of fast-melting snow at Rochester. Winds at Hudson were seemingly more extreme than any other previous storm in the region, and the Hudson Valley as a whole experienced intense gusts throughout the day; however, there was only a single report of inland damage, with houses flattened at Newburgh as a result of the severe winds. Shipping was slightly disrupted throughout the state of New York, with high winds forcing ships to travel with lowered sails, also preventing vessels from docking at New York Harbor on October 10.

=== Southern New England ===
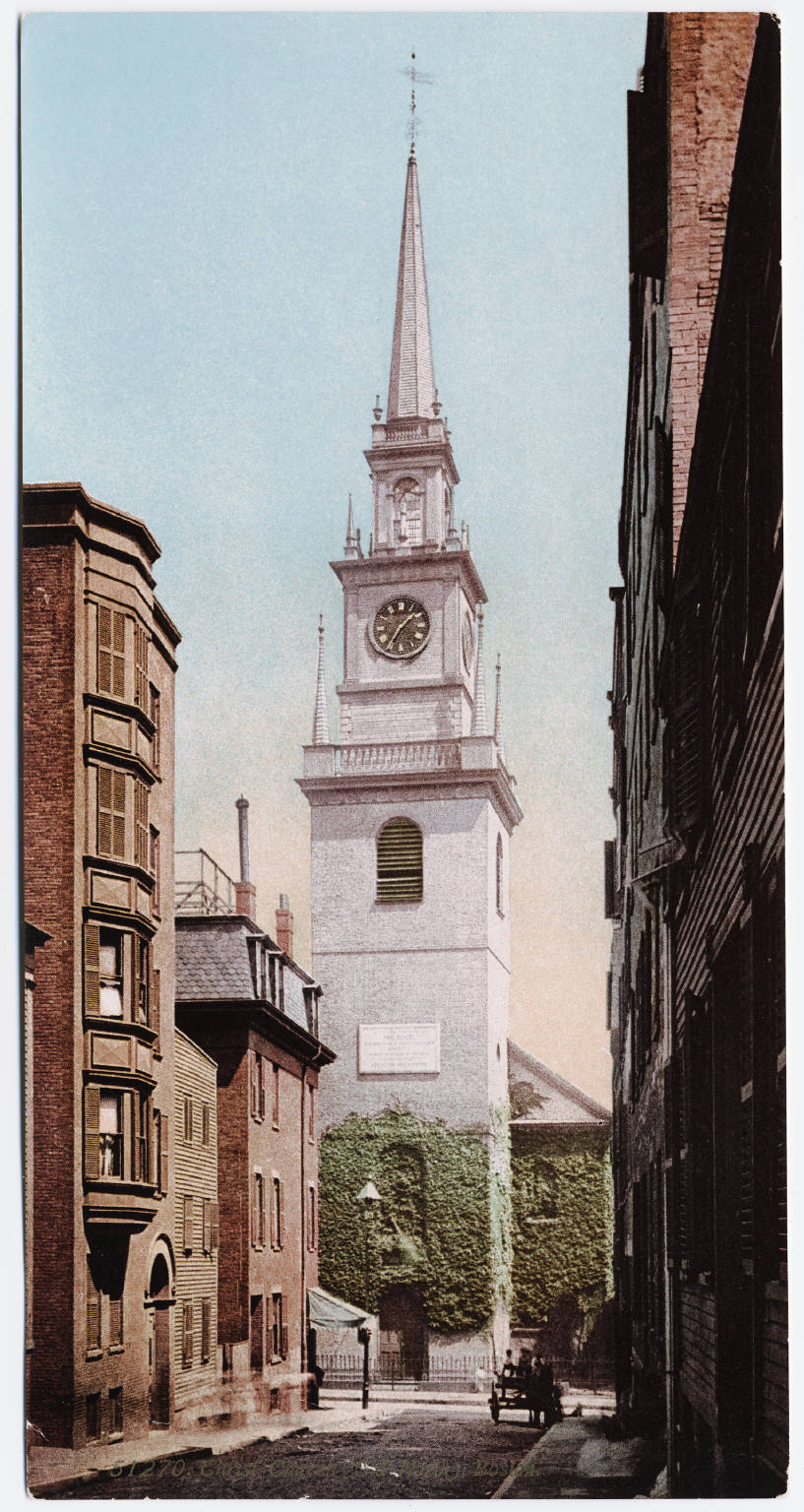
The second steeple of the Old North Church, which replaced the original toppled by the 1804 hurricane

Devastation was widespread throughout the state of Massachusetts, with high winds and heavy snow averaging 5 to 14 in (13 to 36 cm) causing significant havoc. In Boston, strong winds, described as "unprecedented in the annals" of the city, were documented during the afternoon of October 9, with the intense gusts blowing off the steeple of the Old North Church. The steeple was eventually repaired and restored several times, yet was blown down by once more in 1954 by Hurricane Carol and mended once again. Meanwhile, the roof of the King's Chapel was tossed 200 ft (61 m) from its initial location, landing on an adjacent house and crushing two carriages into pieces. Churches and meetinghouses in Salem, Beverly, Charlestown, and Danvers were also seriously impaired. A residence in Boston caved in, killing one person and injuring three others, and consequently was to be demolished. All across the state, the storm bent and crumpled structures and also ruined many wharves. In Dighton and Milton, winds toppled several homes, while shipping was impacted by the storm in Gloucester. Property damage throughout the state – especially to chimneys, roofs, and windows – was generally severe, with chimneys even falling onto stage coaches in the streets of Boston. The Charlestown Navy Yard was dismantled to prevent its imminent collapse, and in Peabody, more than 30,000 unburnt bricks were wrecked.

The storm uprooted thousands of trees throughout the easternmost sections of the state. In the town of Lynn, the storm was reportedly the most severe since the Great Colonial Hurricane of 1635, with roofs torn off structures, fences and chimneys toppled, and orchards bearing the brunt of formidable destruction. The chimney of the local schoolhouse collapsed into the roof and a bench was thrown into the cellar. Intense winds uprooted thousands of trees, of which many sank into local marshes. At Plum Island, gusts toppled trees and fences, yet no residential damage was observed. Further south in Plymouth, however, winds wrecked several houses and overturned numerous boats. At Rehoboth, winds brought down at least 80 trees, and in Quincy, a few houses' roofs were torn away, more than a dozen barns were demolished, and gusts killed numerous cows, with similar damage noted at Taunton. Many ornamental and fruit trees also endured significant damage, high winds blew away many roofs, chimneys, and fences. Meanwhile, at Dedham, more than 130 trees toppled onto the fifth Massachusetts Turnpike, and many forests were razed throughout other parts of the region, making roads impassable. Remarkably, the Endicott Pear Tree in Danvers survived to later weather through three other hurricanes in 1815, 1843, and 1934. Approximately 4 in (100 mm) of rain was measured during the day in Salem, while an additional 3 in (76 mm) fell that evening, apparently "a greater quantity than has ever been known in the same space of time".

At least 27 vessels were damaged by the hurricane in Boston, with six watercraft having struck the South Boston Bridge, resulting in one death. Winds propelled several boats off of Gloucester out to sea, and their company was presumed to be lost. Ships elsewhere also withstood the hurricane's powerful gusts without much success – the Dove capsized at Ipswich Bar, killing seven people. The captain of the Hannah drowned at Cohasset and the vessel Mary was also beached, but the latter craft's crew survived. At Cape Cod, the Protector was swept inland near Highland Light, losing $100,000 (1804 USD) in goods and leading to one death, while the John Harris capsized nearby, its crew perishing with it. Three bodies were also washed ashore at Plymouth, apparently from drowning at sea. Dozens of watercraft were driven aground at Salem, Cape Ann, and Marblehead, causing significant damage. At Abington, the storm's effects to local shipping activities were detrimental, with many vessels shipwrecked by high winds. Despite being heavily occupied, the port at New Bedford experienced no losses of ships or boats.

Powerful winds induced substantial destruction throughout other portions of the state. The diary of William Bentley featured an account on the hurricane, describing the destruction of two barns in Salem and the death of a horse. The property of Paul Revere and Bentley's own house suffered considerable injury, and in nearby Nahant, many buildings' roofs were hurled away by intense gusts. Bentley also observed the unusual abundance of seaweed which was swept inland during the aftermath of the storm. Where snow fell it was mainly heavy, with reports of snowfall totaling 24 to 30 in (61 to 76 cm) in the Berkshires and up to 18 in (46 cm) near Stockbridge; however, no accumulation was measured in Boston and Worcester due to higher-than-optimal temperatures. In Abington, the hurricane not only impacted the shipping industry but also inflicted severe damage to oak and pine forests. Severe damage was inflicted to crops as a result of the storm, with potatoes freezing, apples tossed from branches, and stacks of hay ruined. Livestock also encountered noteworthy losses, with "large numbers" of cattle, sheep, and fowl having died near Walpole, Newbury, and Topsfield – over a hundred cattle died at Topsfield alone.

While reports of snowfall were generally sporadic in Massachusetts, snowfall was copious in Connecticut. More than 3 in (7.6 cm) of snow accumulated at Litchfield, while over 12 in (30 cm) was recorded at Goshen. Moderate snowfall also accrued at Woodbridge, and other regions of the state received up to 24 in (61 cm). However, the delineation between areas of rain and snow was clearly evident, with more than 3.66 in (93 mm) of rain measured in nearby New Haven. Devastation was also widespread in Rhode Island, with numerous houses damaged at Newport and Providence. In Newport, many ships were damaged, and several deaths were recorded. Trees of immense size were also uprooted in both towns, and fence boards were scattered by strong gusts. In Providence, many ships were grounded, a brick house was impaired, and various other structures' chimneys collapsed. The hurricane was described as the "severest storm and gale of wind within the recollection of any of its inhabitants," although little else was known about its impacts in Rhode Island. Despite the high wind speeds and proximity to other snow-receiving areas, none fell in Providence as a result of warmer temperatures.

=== Northern New England and Canada ===
Although winds in New Hampshire, along the hurricane's northern edge, were less severe, higher snowfall totals were recorded. In Portsmouth, damage was minimal and mainly confined to fences. On October 10, thundersnow was observed in Walpole as precipitation changed due to sinking temperatures, which soon followed by a period of high winds. Though the average snowfall amount in the Connecticut River Valley was estimated to be near 15 to 18 in (38 to 46 cm), much of it quickly melted, leaving only 4 to 5 in (10 to 13 cm) left by the snowstorm's departure. Still, the heavy weight of the unusually early wet snow snapped many tree branches still in full bloom, ruining fruit orchards and sugar groves. As a result, production of cider, already in low supply, was reduced even further; damages to one orchard alone reached $300 (1804 USD). Due to snow-obstructed roads, post was delivered on horseback, and at Gilsum, the hurricane was so intense that a group of men traveling toward Keene were forced to return due to blocked roads smothered with over 10 in (25 cm) of snow. The timber industry suffered the blizzard's detrimental effects, the worst blow to the trade since its formation in New Hampshire; in addition, several barns were obliterated. Totals reached 6 in (15 cm) at Hanover, 24 in (61 cm) at Goffstown, and over 36 to 48 in (91 to 122 cm) in the Green Mountains; meanwhile, in southern portions of the state, 4 in (10 cm) of ice accrued upon the accumulations already on the ground. The storm's damage radius was estimated to be at least 50 mi (80 km), and encompassed the towns of Peterborough, Rindge, Lyme, and Amherst, each received 24 to 36 in (61 to 91 cm) of frozen precipitation. At Rye Beach, a woman, swept to sea on a stranded ship, was found dead with an infant in her hands, and the Amity was also wrecked along its shores, causing an additional death.

In contrast to the higher precipitation totals found in New Hampshire, accumulations merely averaged 5 in (13 cm) in Vermont. Even so, a source detailed snowfall depths of 20 in (51 cm) within the vicinity of Lunenburg by the time the hurricane's precipitation subsided, and reported higher depths of 3 ft (0.91 m) in other regions of the state. In the vicinity of Windsor, up to 48 in (120 cm) of snow may have fallen during the course of the snowstorm. The snow was deep enough to cover the entire heights of corn stalks and potato crops, impeding the impending harvest, while massive drifts in the state's hills obstructed roads. Even farther north in Maine, the snowstorm's effects remained disastrous; following its passage, a 60 acres (240,000 m^{2}) timber lot at Thomaston was nearly entirely uprooted, clearing a massive forested area and making towns from great distances away, previously obstructed, suddenly visible. The effect of the storm was so pronounced that, according to Sidney Perley, "people felt as if they were in a strange place". The storm was particularly severe on the Atlantic coast, especially in Kennebec, Wiscaset, Berwick, Kittery, and York, causing moderate destruction and killing several cattle. However, at Portland, the hurricane was less severe and its impact was minimal. Precipitation arrived in Canada on October 9 and persisted through the following day, without triggering any recorded damage.

=== Records ===
Due to its unusual nature, the hurricane of 1804 set several major precedents which have only rarely occurred since then. Having defied many behaviors normally exhibited by New England hurricanes, the cyclone, described as the most severe in the United States since the Great Colonial Hurricane of 1635, was not only unique in its production of snow, but also in its meteorological characteristics and unusual timing. Though the disturbance developed within the confines of the Atlantic hurricane season, its widespread early-season snowfall was unprecedented, with few comparable storms since, among them being the 2011 Halloween nor'easter, producing several feet of snowfall in many areas. Similar circumstances occurred in 2012 with the arrival of Hurricane Sandy, which had a comparable track to the 1804 snowstorm, though it was extratropical by the time it made landfall. The storm was also the first known instance of snow instigated by a tropical cyclone until a later storm in 1841. Since that time, there has been only one other confirmed snowfall event as a result of a tropical cyclone while still considered to be tropical, which was caused by Hurricane Ginny in 1963, generating accumulations of 13 in (33 cm) in Maine. The storm also displayed abnormal meteorological characteristics which went against conventional understanding. Winds prevailed toward the southwest, the only known example of a northeastern hurricane producing winds in that direction; most generally yielded southeasterly gusts. In addition, it was one of only two systems recorded strengthening while inland, the other being the 1869 Saxby Gale.

== See also ==
- 1804 Antigua–Charleston hurricane
- 1804 Atlantic hurricane season
- List of New England hurricanes
- List of disasters in Massachusetts by death toll
- Little ice age
