= Hedrick =

Hedrick may refer to:

- Hedrick, Indiana
- Hedrick, Iowa
- Hedrick, Missouri
- Hedrick (surname)
