= John Endecott =

Governor of Massachusetts Bay Colony (1600–1664)

- Posthumous portrait, c. 1783

1st, 10th, 13th, 15th, and 17th Governor of the Massachusetts Bay Colony
- In office 1629–1630
- Preceded by: Office established
- Succeeded by: John Winthrop
- In office 1644–1645
- Preceded by: John Winthrop
- Succeeded by: Thomas Dudley
- In office 1649–1650
- Preceded by: John Winthrop
- Succeeded by: Thomas Dudley
- In office 1651–1654
- Preceded by: Thomas Dudley
- Succeeded by: Richard Bellingham
- In office 1655–1664
- Preceded by: Richard Bellingham
- Succeeded by: Richard Bellingham

Commissioner of the United Colonies for Massachusetts Bay
- In office 1646–1648
- In office 1658–1658

Personal details
- Born: 1588 Devon England, possibly
- Died: 15 March 1664/1665 (aged 77) Boston, Massachusetts Bay Colony
- Resting place: Tomb 189, Granary Burying Ground
- Spouses: Jane Francis (died 1629); Elizabeth Gibson Married (m. 1630–1665)

John Endecott (also spelled Endicott; 1588 – 15 March 1665), regarded as one of the Fathers of New England, was the longest-serving governor of the Massachusetts Bay Colony, which became the Commonwealth of Massachusetts. He served a total of 16 years, including most of the last 15 years of his life. When not serving as governor, he was involved in other elected and appointed positions from 1628 to 1665 except for the single year of 1634.

Endecott was a zealous and somewhat hotheaded Puritan, with Separatist attitudes toward the Anglican Church. This sometimes put him at odds with Nonconformist views dominant among the colony's early leaders, which became apparent when he gave shelter to the vocally Separatist Roger Williams. He also enslaved a boy from the Pequot tribe. Endecott argued that women should dress modestly and that men should keep their hair short, and issued judicial decisions banishing individuals who held religious views that did not accord well with those of the Puritans. He notoriously defaced the English flag because he saw Saint George's Cross as a symbol of the papacy, and had four Quakers put to death for returning to the colony after their banishment. An expedition he led in 1636 is considered the opening offensive in the Pequot War, which practically destroyed the Pequot tribe as an entity.

Endecott used some of his properties to propagate fruit trees; a pear tree he planted still lives in Danvers, Massachusetts. He also engaged in one of the earliest attempts to develop a mining industry in the colonies when copper ore was found on his land. His name is found on a rock in Lake Winnipesaukee, carved by surveyors sent to identify the Massachusetts colony's northern border in 1652. Places and institutions are named for him, and (like many early colonists) he has several notable descendants.

== Life ==
Coat of Arms of John Endecott

Little is known of Endecott's origins. 19th century biographers believed he hailed from Dorchester, Dorset, due to his significant later association with people from that area. In the early 20th century, historian Roper Lethbridge proposed that Endecott was born circa 1588 in or near Chagford in Devon. In the 16th century the prominent Endecott family, together with the Whiddons, Knapmans and Lethbridges, owned most of the mines around the stannary town of Chagford, which might—if he is indeed from this family—explain his interest in developing copper mining. (Based on this evidence, Chagford now has a house from the period named in Endecott's honour.)

However, more recent research by the New England Historic Genealogical Society has identified problems with Lethbridge's claims, which they dispute. According to their research, Endecott may have been born in or near Chagford, but there is no firm evidence for this, nor is there evidence that identifies his parents. They conclude, based on available evidence, that he was probably born no later than 1600. A John Endecott was active in Devon early in the 17th century, but there is no firm evidence connecting him to this Endecott.

Very little is known of Endecott's life before his association with colonisation efforts in the 1620s. He was known to Sir Edward Coke, and may have come to know Roger Williams through this connection. He was highly literate, and spoke French. Some early colonial documents refer to him as "Captain Endecott", indicating some military experience, and other records suggest he had some medical training.

=== Settlement in the New World ===
In March 1627/28, Endecott was one of seven signatories to a land grant given to "The New England Company for a Plantation in Massachusetts" (or the New England Company) by the Earl of Warwick on behalf of the Plymouth Council for New England; the council was at the time the umbrella organisation overseeing English colonisation efforts in North America between 40 and 48 degrees latitude.

Endecott was chosen to lead the first expedition, and sailed for the New World aboard the Abigail with fifty or so "planters and servants" on 20 June 1628. The settlement they organized was first called Naumkeag, after the local Indian tribe, but was eventually renamed Salem in 1629. The area was already occupied by settlers of the failed Dorchester Company, some of whose backers also participated in the New England Company. This group of earlier settlers, led by Roger Conant, had migrated from a settlement on Cape Ann (near present-day Gloucester, Massachusetts) after it was abandoned. Endecott was not formally named governor of the new colony until it was issued a royal charter in 1629. At that time, he was appointed governor by the Company's council in London, and Matthew Craddock was named the Company's governor in London.

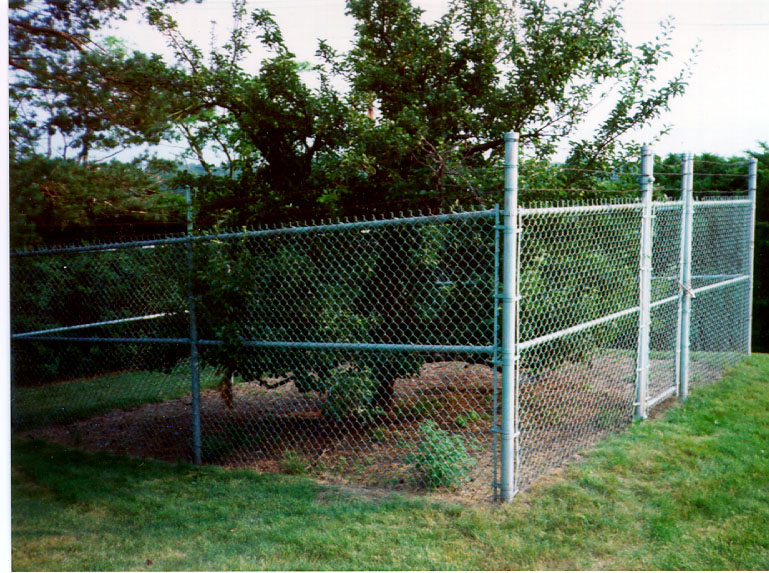
The Endicott Pear Tree in 1997

Endecott's responsibility was to establish the colony and to prepare it for the arrival of additional settlers. The winters of 1629 and 1630 were difficult compared to those in England, and he called on the Plymouth Colony for medical assistance. His wife, who had been ill on the voyage over, died that winter. Other difficulties he encountered included early signs of religious friction among the colony's settlers (dividing between Nonconformists and Separatists), and poor relations with Thomas Morton, whose failed Wessagusset Colony and libertine practices (which included a maypole and dancing) were anathema to the conservative Puritanism practiced by most settlers in the Massachusetts Bay and Plymouth colonies. Early in his term as governor he visited the abandoned site of Morton's colony and had the maypole taken down. When one group of early settlers wanted to establish a church independent of that established by the colonial leadership, he had their leaders summarily sent back to England.

=== Early 1630s ===
Endecott's first tenure as governor came to an end in 1630, with the arrival of John Winthrop and the colonial charter. The company had reorganised itself, relocating its seat to the colony itself, with Winthrop as its sole governor. After seeing the conditions at Salem, Winthrop decided to relocate the colony's seat at the mouth of the Charles River, where he founded what is now the city of Boston. Endecott, who was chosen as one of the governor's Assistants (a precursor to the later notion of a Governor's Council), chose to remain in Salem, where he was one of its leading citizens for the rest of his life, serving in roles as town councilor and militia leader, in addition to statewide roles as militia leader, magistrate, deputy governor, and governor. He established a plantation called "Orchard" in Salem Village (now known as Danvers), where he cultivated seedlings of fruit trees. One particular pear tree, brought over as a sapling on one of the early settlement convoys, still lives and bears fruit; it is known as the Endicott Pear Tree.

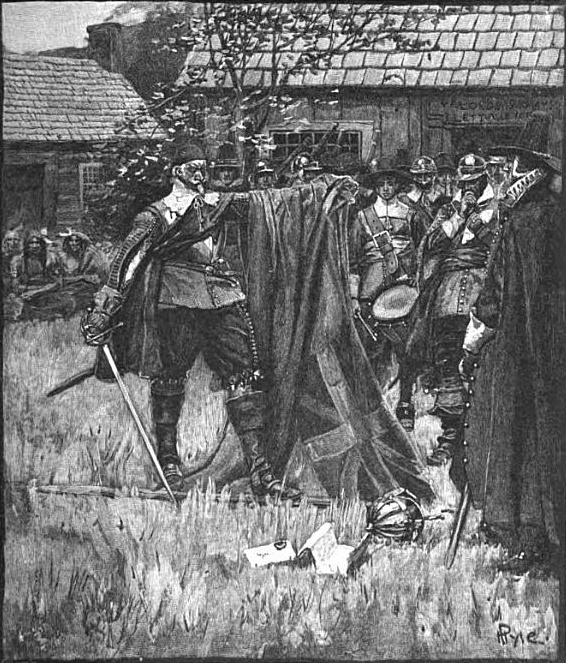
Illustration by Howard Pyle showing Endecott defacing the English flag. Pyle has incorrectly depicted the flag as a Union Jack, when the flag at the time only contained Saint George's Cross.

In the early 1630s the religious conflict between the Nonconformists and the Separatists was the primary source of political disagreement in the colony, and it was embodied by the churches established in Boston and Salem. The Salem church adhered to Separatist teachings, which sought a complete break with the Church of England, while Nonconformist teachings, which were held by Winthrop and most of the colonial leadership in Boston, sought to reform the Anglican church from within.

The arrival in Boston in 1631 of Roger Williams, an avowed Separatist, heightened this conflict. Authorities there banished him, and he first went to Salem, where, due to Endecott's intervention, he was offered a position as a teacher in the local church. When word of this reached Boston, Endecott was criticised for supporting Williams, who was banished from the colony. Williams went to Plymouth, but returned to Salem a few years later, becoming the church's unofficial pastor following the death of Samuel Skelton in 1634. Boston authorities called for his arrest after he made what they viewed as treasonous and heretical statements; he fled, eventually establishing Providence, Rhode Island.

During this time Endecott argued that women should be veiled in church, and controversially defaced the local militia's flag, because it bore St George's Cross, which Williams claimed was a symbol of the papacy. This action is celebrated in Nathaniel Hawthorne's story, "Endicott and the Red Cross", where the writer presents the "tension between Endecott as a symbol of religious intolerance and as emblem of heroic resistance to foreign domination of New England." Endecott did this at a time when the Privy Council of King Charles I was examining affairs in Massachusetts, and the colonial administration was concerned that a strong response was needed to prevent the loss of the colonial charter. Endecott was censured for the rashness of his action (and not for the act itself), and deprived of holding any offices for one year; 1635 was the only year in which he held no office. The committee managing the colonial militia voted that year to stop using the English flag as its standard.

Following the incident, and the refusal of the colonial assembly to grant Salem additional land on the Marblehead Neck because of Williams' presence in Salem, the Salem church circulated a letter to other churches in the colony, calling the legislative act a heinous sin. Although the authorship of the letter is uncertain, Endecott defended the letter when summoned to Boston, and was consequently jailed for a day; after "he came and acknowledged his fault, he was discharged."

=== Pequot War ===
In 1636 the boat of Massachusetts trader John Oldham was seen anchored off Block Island, swarming with Indians. The Indians fled at the approach of the investigating colonists, and Oldham's body was found below the main deck. The attackers were at the time believed to be from tribes affiliated with the Narragansetts, but Narragansett leaders claimed that those responsible had fled to the protection of the Pequots. At the time the Pequots were aggressively expansionist in their dealings with the surrounding native tribes (including the Narragansett), but had generally kept the peace with the English colonists of present-day southern New England. The accusation of the Narraganssetts angered Massachusetts authorities (then under governor Henry Vane), who were already upset that the Pequots had earlier failed to turn over men implicated in killing another trader on the Connecticut River. This second perceived affront produced calls in Massachusetts for action against the Pequots. In August 1636 Governor Vane placed Endecott at the head of a 90-man force to extract justice from the Pequots.

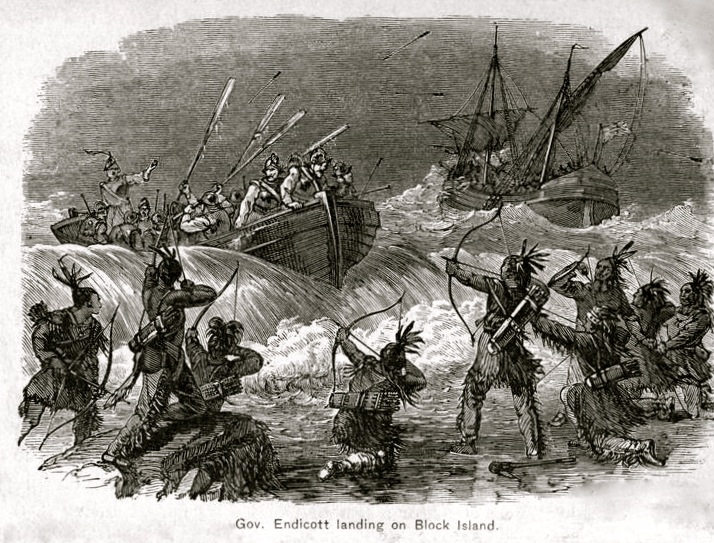
Engraving depicting Endecott's men landing on Block Island

Endecott's instructions were to go to Block Island, where he was to kill all of the Indian men and take captive the women and children. He was then to go to the Pequots on the mainland, where he was to make three demands: first, that the killers of Oldham and the other trader be surrendered; second, that a payment of one thousand fathoms of wampum be made; and third, that some Pequot children be delivered to serve as hostages.

Endecott executed these instructions with zeal. Although most of the Indians on Block Island only briefly opposed the English landing there, he spent two days destroying their villages, crops and canoes; most of the Indians on the island successfully eluded English searches for them. English reports claimed as many as 14 Indians were killed, but the Narragansetts only reported one fatality. Endecott then sailed for Saybrook, an English settlement at the mouth of the Connecticut River. Lion Gardiner, the leader there, angrily informed Endecott when he learned of the mission's goals, "You come hither to raise these wasps around my ears, and then you will take wing and flee away."

After some discussion and delays due to bad weather, Gardiner and a company of his men agreed to accompany the Massachusetts force to raid the Pequot harvest stores. When they arrived at the Pequot village near the mouth of the Thames River, they returned the friendly greetings of the inhabitants with stony silence. Eventually a Pequot sachem rowed out to meet them; the English delivered their demands, threatening war if they did not receive satisfaction. When the sachem left to discuss the matter in the village, Endecott gave a promise to await his return; however, shortly after the sachem left, he began landing his fully armed men on shore. The sachem rushed back, claiming the senior tribal leaders were away on Long Island; Endecott responded that this was a lie, and ordered an attack on the village. Most of the villagers got away, and once again the expedition's activity was reduced to destroying the village and seizing its crop stores; Gardiner reported that "[t]he Bay-men killed not a man." After completing this work, Endecott and the Massachusetts men boarded their boats to return to Boston, leaving Gardiner and his men to finish the removal of the crops. The Pequots regrouped and launched an attack on Gardiner's party whose armor protected them from the arrowfire, but their escape was nevertheless difficult.

Historian Alfred Cave describes Endecott's actions as a "heavy-handed provocation of an Indian war." All of the surrounding colonies protested the action, complaining that the lives of their citizens were placed in jeopardy by the raid. Since the Pequots had previously been relatively peaceful with the English, Endecott's raid had the effect Gardiner predicted and feared. Communities on the Connecticut River were attacked in April 1637, and Gardiner was virtually besieged in Saybrook by Pequot forces. Endecott had no further role in the war, which ended with the destruction of the Pequots as a tribe; their land was divided up by the colonies and their Indian allies in the 1638 Treaty of Hartford, and the surviving tribespeople were distributed among their neighbors. One captive, an enslaved Pequot boy, was sold to Endecott in 1637.

=== Later terms as governor ===
Endecott was elected deputy governor in 1641 and in this role was one of the signatories to the Massachusetts Body of Liberties, which enumerated a number of individual rights available to all colonists, and presaged the United States Bill of Rights. The next few years were quiet, although rumors of war with the Indians led to the formation in 1643 of the New England Confederation, designed to facilitate united action by the New England colonies against common external threats as well as internal matters such as dealing with escaped slaves and fugitives from justice.

In 1643, Governor Winthrop became embroiled in a controversy over the propriety of taking sides in a power struggle going on in neighbouring French Acadia. Endecott pointed out that he should have let the French fight amongst themselves without English involvement, as this would weaken them both. The 1644 governor's election became a referendum on Winthrop's policy; Endecott was elected governor, with Winthrop as his deputy. During his one-year term he oversaw the division of the colony into four counties: Suffolk, Essex, Middlesex, and Norfolk. The ascent of the Salem-based Endecott also prompted an attempt by other Salem residents to have the colonial capital relocated there; the attempt was rejected by the governor's council of assistants.

Fallout from the English Civil War (begun in 1642) also permeated Boston during Endecott's tenure. Two ships, one with a Royalist captain, the other with a Parliamentarian captain, arrived in Boston, and the Parliamentarian sought to seize the Royalist ship. After much deliberation, Endecott's councils essentially adopted support of the Parliamentarian position, reserving the right to declare independence if the Parliament "should hereafter be a malignant spirit." The Parliamentarian was permitted to seize the Royalist vessel, and the colony also began seizing Royalist vessels that came into port.

Thomas Dudley was elected governor in 1645, with Winthrop as his deputy. Endecott, as a consolation, was given command of the colonial militia, reporting to the governor. He was also once again made a governor's assistant, and was chosen to represent the colony to the confederation in 1646. The threat of Indian conflicts in neighbouring colonies prompted the colony to raise its defensive profile, in which Endecott played a leading role. Winthrop was reelected governor in 1646; after his death in 1649, Endecott succeeded him as governor. By annual re-elections Endecott served nearly continuously until his death in 1664/5; for two periods (1650–1651 and 1654–1655) he was deputy governor.

In 1639 Endecott had been granted several hundred acres of land north of Salem, in what is now Boxford and Topsfield. The tract was not formally laid out until 1659, but as early as 1651 Endecott was granted an additional "three hundred acres of land to tend the furtherance of a copper works" that was adjacent to his land. Endecott hired Richard Leader, an early settler who had done pioneering work at an iron works in nearby Lynn, but the efforts to develop the site for copper processing failed.

A persistent shortage of coinage in all of the colonies prompted Massachusetts to establish a mint on 27 May 1652, and begin production of coins from its silver reserves. This act solved a practical problem, but the colony had no authority to do so from the crown. Although this did not become an issue while Endecott was governor, it eventually became a source of controversy with the crown, and the mint had apparently ceased operations around 1682.

The colony's boundaries expanded somewhat during Endecott's tenure, mainly in the 1650s. In addition to formally claiming present-day Stonington, Connecticut as spoils from the Pequot War, Endecott sought to establish the colony's northern boundary. In 1652 he sent a commission with surveyors to locate the most northerly point on the Merrimack River, since the colonial grant defined its northern border as 3 miles (4.8 km) north of that river. These surveyors were led by Indian guides to the outlet of Lake Winnipesaukee which was claimed by the guides to be the source of the Merrimack. At that location, the party incised an inscription on a rock that survives, and is now located in a small New Hampshire state park. When this survey line was extended eastward, the boundary was determined to fall on the coast at Casco Bay, and the colony thus claimed most of what is now southern Maine and New Hampshire.

=== Religious intolerance ===
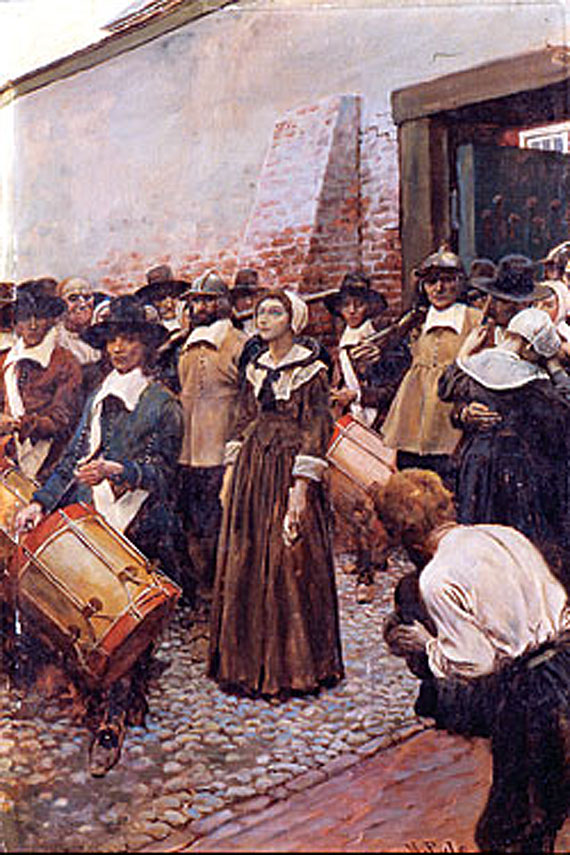
Mary Dyer being led to the gallows in 1660 (painting by Howard Pyle)

One written statement made early in his tenure in May 1649 showed Endecott's dislike of a fashionable trend toward long hair: "Forasmuch as the wearing of long haire after the manner of Ruffians and barbarous Indians, hath begun to invade new England contrary to the rule of gods word ... Wee the Magistrates who have subscribed [signed] this paper ... doe declare and manifest our dislike and detestation against the wearing of such long haire." In 1651 he presided over a legal case in which three people were accused of being Baptists, a practice that had been banned in the colony in 1644. In convicting John Clarke and sentencing him to either pay a fine or be whipped, Endecott, according to Clarke's account of the exchange, told Clarke that he "deserved death, and said he would not have such trash brought into his jurisdiction." Clarke refused to pay the fine; it was paid by friends against his wishes, and he returned to Rhode Island. Of the three men convicted, only Obadiah Holmes was whipped; John Crandall, out on bond, returned to Rhode Island with Clarke.

When Oliver Cromwell consolidated his control over England in the early 1650s, he began a crackdown on religious communities that dissented from his religious views. This notably included Baptists and Quakers, and these groups began their own migration to the North American colonies to escape persecution. Those that first arrived in Boston in 1656 were promptly deported by Endecott's deputy, Richard Bellingham, while Endecott was in Salem. More Quakers arrived while Endecott was resident in Boston, and he had them imprisoned pending trial and deportation. He met several times with the Quaker Mary Prince, after receiving an "outrageous letter" from her. The meetings were apparently fruitless, and she and the other Quakers were deported. Following these acts, the members of the New England Confederation all adopted measures for the prompt removal of Quakers from their jurisdictions.

And on his horse, with Rawson, his cruel clerk at hand,
Sat dark and haughty Endicott, the ruler of the land.

— Excerpt from "Cassandra Southwick" by John Greenleaf Whittier

The measures adopted were insufficient to prevent the influx of these perceived undesirables, so harsher measures were enacted. Repeat offenders were to be punished by having ears cut off, and, on the third offense, to have the tongue "bored through with a hot iron". By 1658 the punishment for the third offense had been raised to death, "except they do then and there plainly and publicly renounce their said cursed opinions and devilish tenets." In October 1658 the death penalty was enacted for the second offense in Massachusetts. One year later, three Quakers were arrested and sentenced to death under this law. Two of them, Marmaduke Stephenson and William Robinson, were hanged, while the third, Mary Dyer, received a reprieve at the last minute. Dyer returned to the colony in 1660, and, under questioning by Endecott and the other magistrates, refused to either recant her beliefs or agree to permanent banishment from the colony. She was hanged on 1 June 1660; she, Stephenson, Robinson, and William Leddra (hanged in 1661) are now known as the Boston martyrs. The severity of these acts was recognized by the colonists as problematic, and the laws were changed so that execution was the penalty for the fifth offense. (The poor treatment of Quakers and other religious dissenters would be cited as one of the reasons for revocation of the colonial charter in 1684.)

Endecott's role in the treatment of the Quakers was immortalized by John Greenleaf Whittier in his poem "The Ballad of Cassandra Southwick," named for another Quaker who suffered persecution along with husband Lawrence and at least three of her six children, daughter Provided and sons Daniel and Josiah, while Endecott was governor. Whittier characterized Endecott as "dark and haughty", and exhibiting "bitter hate and scorn" for the Quaker. Henry Wadsworth Longfellow recreated the trial of Wenlock Christison in "John Endicott", one of three dramatic poems in a collection called New England Tragedies. Christison was the last Quaker Endecott sentenced to death for returning to Massachusetts after having been banished. He was not executed, however, because the law was changed shortly after his sentencing. Author Nathaniel Hawthorne described Endecott in "The Gentle Boy", whose title character is the six-year-old son of William and Mary Dyer, as "a man of narrow mind and imperfect education, and his uncompromising bigotry was made hot and mischievous by violent and hasty passions; he exerted his influence indecorously and unjustifiably to compass the death of the enthusiasts [i.e., the Quakers]; and his whole contact, in respect to them, was marked by brutal cruelty."

Even though the Puritan colonists of New England were supportive of Oliver Cromwell's reign in England, they were not always receptive to Cromwell's suggestions. In response to a proposal by Cromwell that New Englanders migrate to Ireland to increase its Protestant population, the Massachusetts assembly drafted a polite response, signed by Endecott, indicating that its people were happy where they were.

=== English Restoration ===
In July 1660 word arrived in Boston that Charles II had been restored to the English throne. This was an immediate cause for concern in all of the colonies that had supported Cromwell, since their charters might be revoked. In Boston it created a more difficult problem for Edward Whalley and William Goffe, two of the "regicide" commissioners who had voted to execute Charles I. Although Charles promised in the 1660 Declaration of Breda that all were pardoned except by act of Parliament, the Indemnity and Oblivion Act 1660 singled out all of the regicides for punishment. Whalley and Goffe moved freely about the Boston area for some time, and Endecott refused to order their arrest until word arrived of the passage of the Indemnity Act. Endecott then issued a warrant for their arrest on 8 March 1661. It is unknown whether Whalley and Goffe had advance warning of the warrant, but they fled, apparently to the New Haven area.

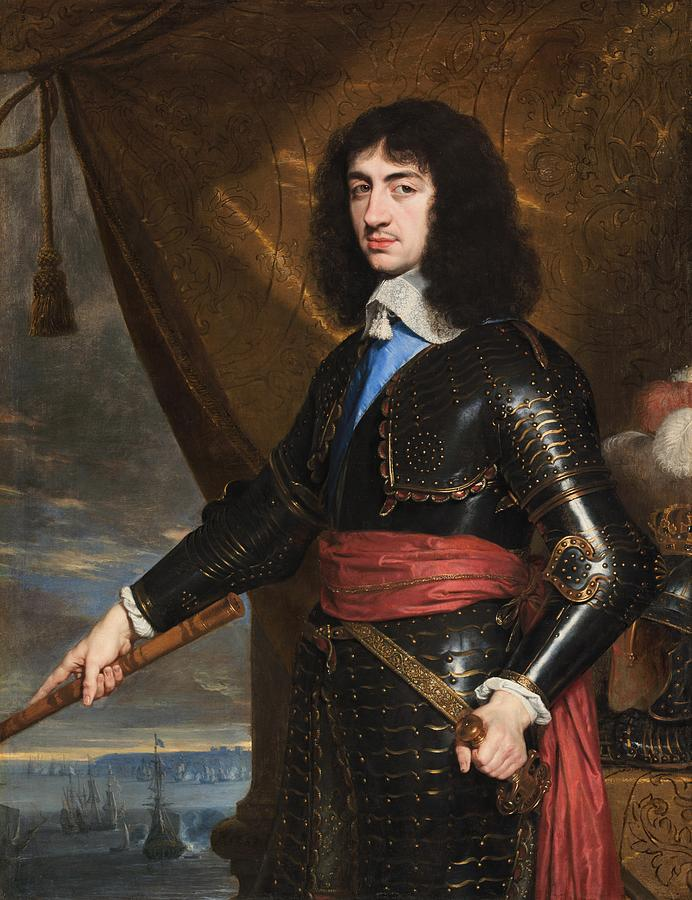
Portrait of Charles II, c. 1653

Endecott's warrant was followed by an order issued by King Charles in March and received by Endecott in May 1661 containing a direct order to apprehend the two fugitives and ship them back to England. Endecott dutifully obeyed, but he appointed two recently arrived Royalists to track them down. Somewhat predictably, their search came up empty, and Whalley and Goffe thus escaped. Biographer Lawrence Mayo suggests Endecott would have appointed different men for the search had he been serious about catching them.

Opponents to the rule of the Puritans in Massachusetts were vocal in airing their complaints to the new king. Among their complaints was that Charles' ascension to power had not been formally announced; this only took place in 1661 after Endecott received a chastising order from the king. This prompted the assembly to draft another of several laudatory letters it addressed to the king, congratulating him on his rise to power. The mint was claimed to be a bald-faced attempt to devalue good English currency, some colonists complained that the expansion of the colony's borders in 1652 was little more than a land grab, while others put forward claims of administrative malfeasance with respect to funds provided by the crown for the Christianization of Indians, and the Quakers catalogued a long list of grievances. Believing that it was best to ignore the accusations, Endecott and other members of the old guard opposed sending representatives to London to argue against these charges. Supporters of the idea raised funds in a private subscription, and sent a commission to London.

The colonial mission, led by future governor Simon Bradstreet and pastor John Norton, was successful, and King Charles announced that he would renew the colonial charter, provided the colony allowed the Church of England to practice there. The Endecott administration dragged its feet on implementation, and after months of inaction, the king sent a commission headed by Samuel Maverick, one of the colony's most vocal critics, to investigate. Endecott had advance warning of what the commission was to investigate, and took steps to address in form, if not in substance, some of the expected actions. Charles insisted that all religious dissenters be freed, which Endecott had done long before Maverick's arrival, but he did so by deporting them. Upon the commissioners' arrival, the assembly took up the matter of allowing Church of England activity in the colony. They passed a law deliberately using the king's language, allowing anyone "orthodox in religion" to practice in the colony; however, they also defined such orthodoxy as consisting of views that were acceptable to local ministers. This effectively negated the law, because there were probably no ministers in the colony who would agree that Anglicans satisfied their idea of orthodoxy.

=== Last years ===
In 1655 the Massachusetts assembly passed a law requiring its governor to live closer to Boston; this was probably done in response to Endecott's sixth consecutive election as governor. Endecott was consequently obliged to acquire a residence in Boston; although he returned to Salem frequently, Boston became his home for the rest of his life. Endecott died in Boston on 15 March 1664/5. Although early accounts claim he was buried at Boston's King's Chapel, later evidence has identified his burial site as tomb 189 in the Granary Burying Ground.

== Family ==
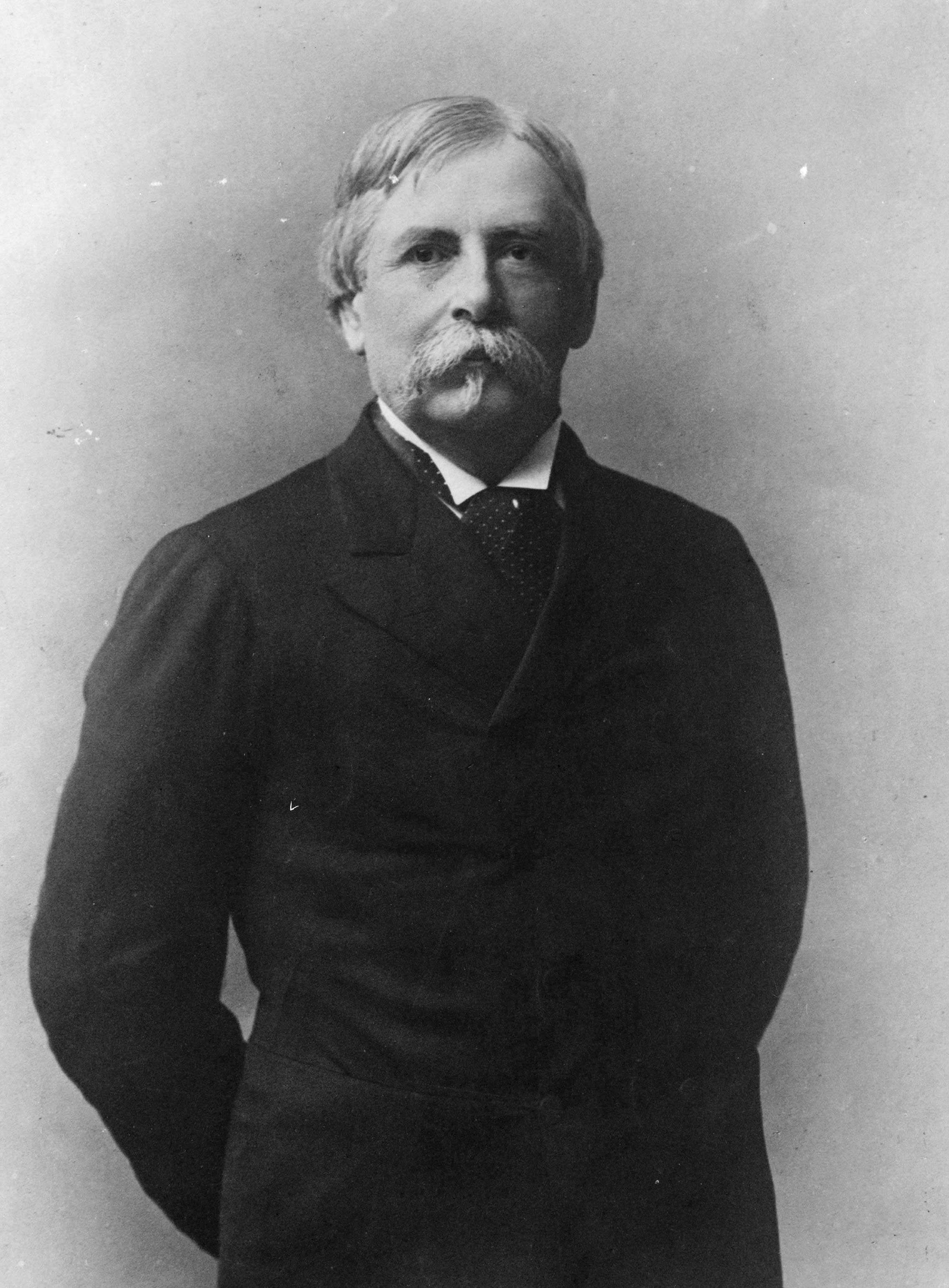
Endecott descendant William Crowninshield Endicott

Before he came to the colonies in 1628, Endecott was married to his first wife, Anne Gourer (or Gower), who was a cousin of Governor Matthew Craddock. After her death in New England, he was married in 1630 to a woman whose last name was Gibson, and by 1640 he was married to Elizabeth, the daughter of Philobert Cogan of Somersetshire. It is uncertain whether these represent two different wives, or a single wife whose name was Elizabeth (Cogan) Gibson. Due to this uncertainty concerning his wives, it is not known who the mother of his two sons was. There is only firm evidence that he was already married to Elizabeth in 1640, and the records that survive for the 1630s, when his sons were born, do not otherwise identify his wife by name. Endecott's last wife, Elizabeth, was a sister-in-law of the colonial financier and magistrate Roger Ludlow. Endecott's two known children were John Endecott and Dr. Zerubabbel Endecott, neither of whom, seemingly to his disappointment, followed him into public service. There is also evidence that Endecott fathered another child in his early years in England; in about 1635 he arranged funds and instructions for the care of a minor also named John Endecott.

Despite his high position, Endecott was never particularly affluent. According to his will, several large tracts of land, including the Orchard estate in Salem and one quarter of Block Island, were distributed to his wife and sons; however, it was also noted that some of his books were sold to pay debts. One unexpected legacy left behind by Endecott was the uncertain boundaries of the Orchard estate. Several generations later, his descendants were involved in litigation concerning disputed occupancy of part of the estate.

Endecott's descendants include Massachusetts governor Endicott Peabody and United States Secretary of War William Crowninshield Endicott. His descendants donated family records dating as far back as the colonial era to the Massachusetts Historical Society.

In 1930, the Massachusetts tercentenary was marked by the issuance of a medal bearing Endecott's likeness; it was designed by Laura Gardin Fraser. Endicott College in Beverly, Massachusetts (once a part of Salem) is named for him.

== Namesakes ==
In 1831, the brig Governor Endicott, of Salem, H. H. Jenks, master, was engaged in the pepper trade on the coast of Sumatra when she had occasion to help free Friendship, also of Salem, Charles Endicott, master, from Malay pirates. He and some of his officers had gone ashore to negotiate for pepper in the town of Quallah Battoo when pirates took over the ship, murdered some of her crew and looted the cargo. Captain Endicott obtained aid from Governor Endicott and the ship James Monroe, of New York, J. Porter, master, to rescue his ship from her captors and return her to Salem, where he arrived 16 July 1831.

== Notes ==
Political offices
New office	Governor of the Massachusetts Bay Colony; 1629–1630	Succeeded by John Winthrop
Preceded by John Winthrop	Governor of the Massachusetts Bay Colony; 1644–1645	Succeeded by Thomas Dudley
Preceded by John Winthrop	Governor of the Massachusetts Bay Colony; 1649–1650	Succeeded by Thomas Dudley
Preceded by Thomas Dudley	Governor of the Massachusetts Bay Colony; 1651–1654	Succeeded by Richard Bellingham
Preceded by Richard Bellingham	Governor of the Massachusetts Bay Colony; 1655–1664	Succeeded by Richard Bellingham
