= Endicott Rock =

- U.S. National Register of Historic Places
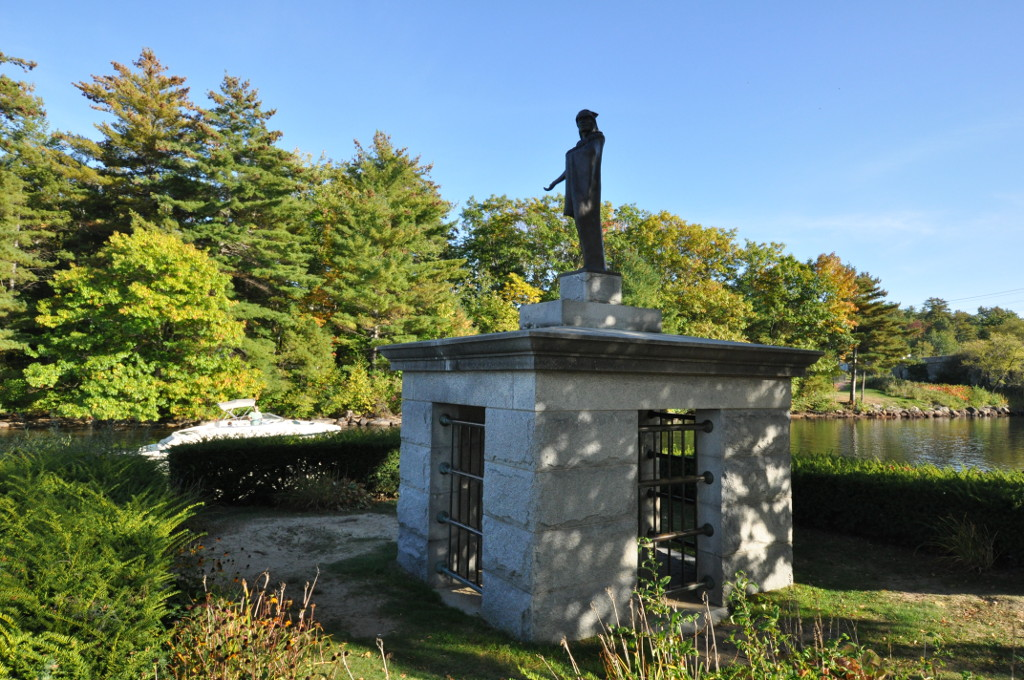
- The rock's enclosure

- Location within New Hampshire Location within the United States
- Location: Weirs Channel, Laconia, New Hampshire
- Coordinates: 43°36′15″N 71°27′22″W
- Area: less than one acre
- Built: 1652
- Website: Endicott Rock State Historic Site
- NRHP reference No.: 80000264
- Added to NRHP: May 28, 1980

Endicott Rock is a state park located on the shore of Lake Winnipesaukee in the Weirs Beach village of Laconia, New Hampshire. Its principal attraction is a large rock originally in the lake that was incised with lettering in 1652 by surveyors for the Massachusetts Bay Colony. The rock provides definitive evidence of one of the earliest incursions of Europeans into the area.

For many years the rock's existence was unknown, until it was rediscovered in the 19th century when the Weirs Channel was dredged. The state then undertook to protect the rock from the elements, building a pavilion over it and stabilizing cracks in the rock with iron fittings. The markings on the rock include "IOHN ENDICUT GOV", a reference to John Endecott, who was then governor of the Massachusetts Bay Colony, and the initials of the surveyors. The colony's boundaries, according to its charter, were 3 miles (4.8 km) north of the Merrimack River, and the rock was incorrectly believed by the English party to mark the northernmost head of the river (the headwaters of the Merrimack's main tributary, the Pemigewasset River, are significantly further north, but the survey party was misled by its Indian guides).

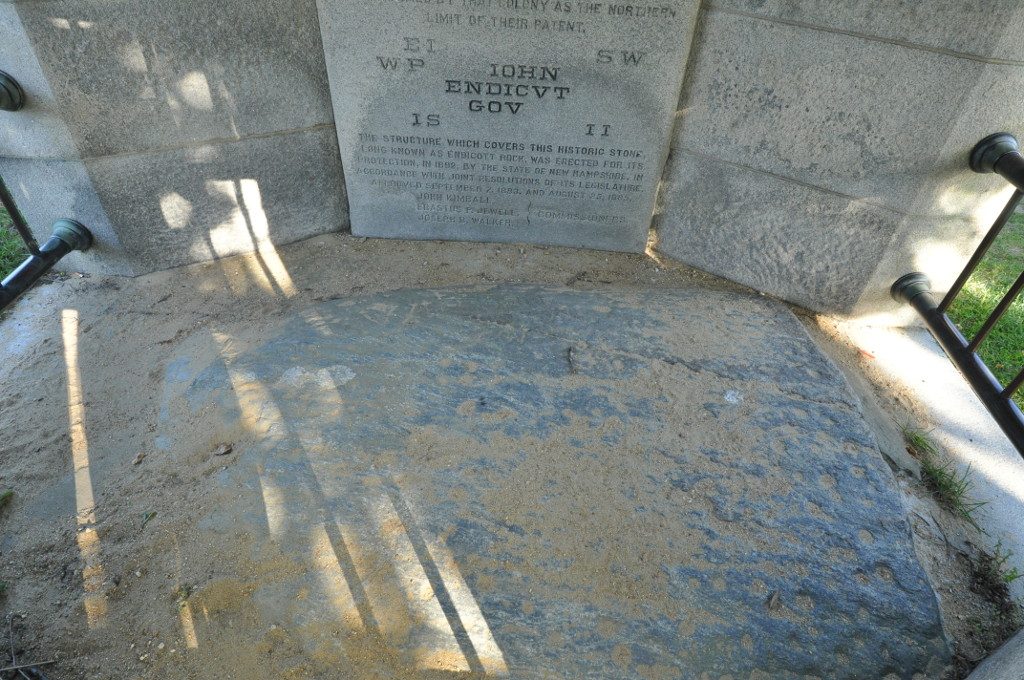
The rock

Admission to the small park is free and offers picnic facilities. (The parking fee in the immediate vicinity is $10.) Materials from the New Hampshire Division of Parks and Recreation sometimes identify the site as a historic site, and sometimes as a state park. A rectangular area surrounding the rock and its sheltering pavilion were listed on the National Register of Historic Places in 1980.

== See also ==
- National Register of Historic Places listings in Belknap County, New Hampshire
