= Wilbur Olin Hedrick =

- Former economics professor at the M.S.C. and the U. of M.
- Born: April 3, 1868; Elkhart, Indiana, U.S.
- Died: June 10, 1954 (aged 86)

Academic work
- Discipline: Economics
- Notable ideas: Economics of a Food Supply

Wilbur O. Hedrick (1868–1954) started as a professor of economics at Michigan State College in 1908.

== Life ==
Born on April 3, 1868, in Elkhart, Indiana. He grew up in northern Michigan near Harbor Springs. He is the brother of Ulysses Prentiss Hedrick. He was married to Lucelia D. Baker. He fathered five children, Prentice Benjamin, Helen, Hester, Amy, and Marian.

He pioneered student co-operatives in East Lansing, and Hedrick House, named after him and opened in 1939, is the oldest student-owned co-operative in the USA.

"No living person in this community has contributed more to M.S.C. than you have in your long period of distinguished service," said John A. Hannah in reference to Hedrick's accomplishments over his lengthy employment of 47 years as a faculty member at M.S.C.

== Bibliography ==
- The history of Railroad Taxation in Michigan: a thesis, Lansing, 1912
- The Economics of a Food Supply, D. Appleton & Co.: New York, London, 1924.
