= 2011 Halloween nor'easter =

Heavy snowstorm that hit Northeast US and Canada in late October that year

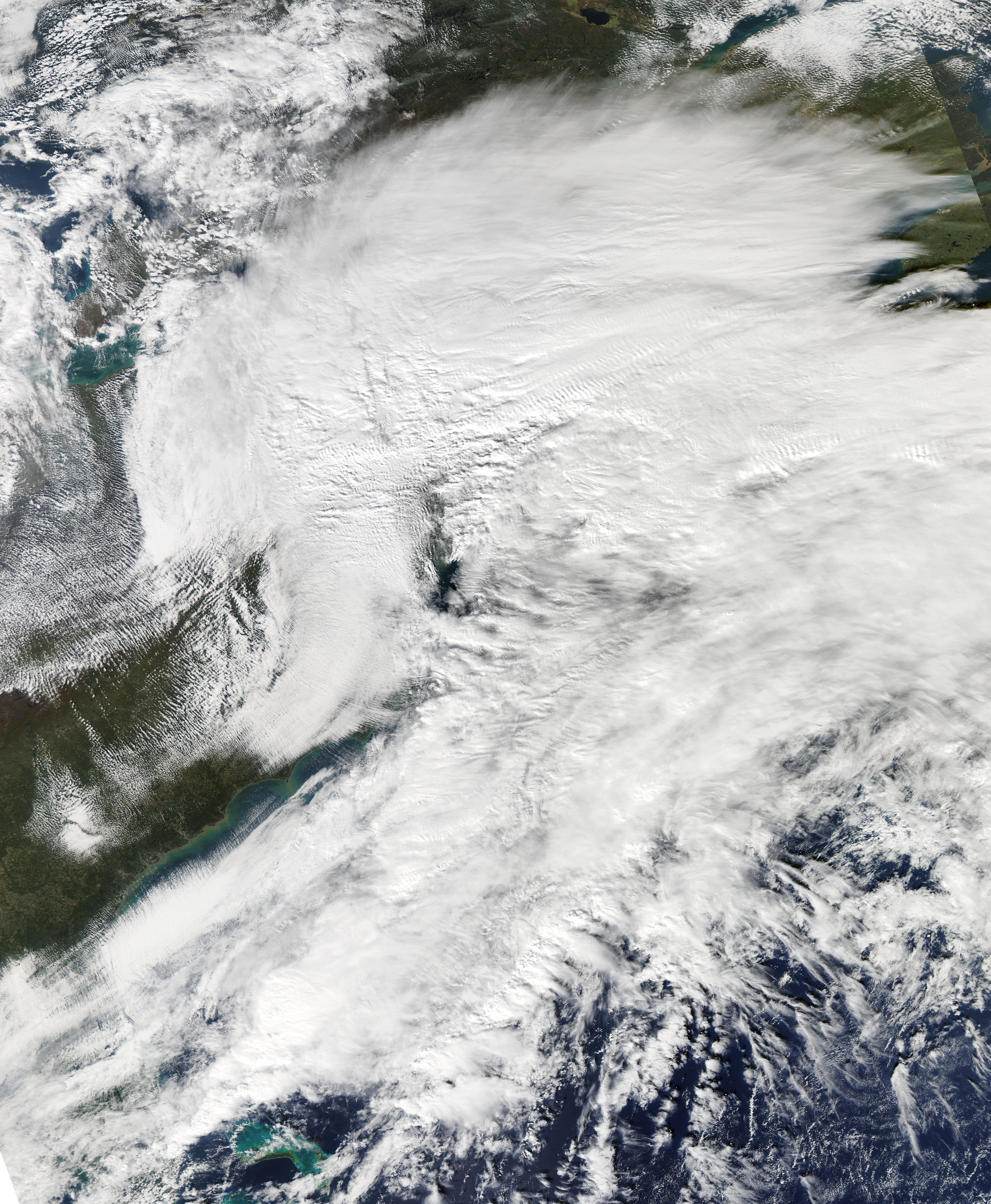
- Satellite image of the storm on October 29, 2011

Meteorological history
- Formed: October 28, 2011
- Dissipated: November 1, 2011

Category 1 "Notable" Winter storm
- Regional snowfall index: 1.97 (NOAA)
- Lowest pressure: 971 mbar (hPa); 28.67 inHg
- Max. snowfall: 32 inches (81 cm), Peru, Massachusetts

Overall effects
- Fatalities: 39 total
- Damage: $1–3 billion (2011 USD)
- Areas affected: Northeastern United States, Atlantic Canada
- Power outages: >3,389,000
- Part of the 2011–12 North American winter

The 2011 Halloween nor'easter, sometimes referred to as "Snowtober," "Shocktober," "Storm Alfred," and "Oktoberblast," was a large low pressure area that produced unusually early snowfall across the Canadian Maritimes and the northeastern United States. It formed early on October 29 along a cold front to the southeast of the Carolinas. As it moved up the East Coast, its associated snowfall broke records in at least 20 cities for total accumulations, resulting in a rare "white Halloween" two days later.

The storm arrived just two months after Hurricane Irene caused extensive power outages and property damage in the Northeast; with the 2011 New England tornado outbreak also causing damage in Western Massachusetts. It dumped snow on trees that were often still in leaf, adding extra weight, with the ground in some areas still soft from a preceding warm, rainy period that increased the possibility trees could be uprooted. Trees and branches that collapsed caused considerable damage, particularly to power lines, with estimates of storm costs ranging between $1 billion and $3 billion. In all, 3.2 million U.S. residences and businesses in 12 states experienced power outages, with the storm also impacting three Canadian provinces.

Some customers in Connecticut did not get power back until early November; many outages lasted 11 days. Many communities chose to postpone celebrations of Halloween from two days to a week later as a result, or cancel them entirely. Delays in restoring power led to the resignation of the chief operating officer of Connecticut Light & Power amid widespread criticism of the company's mishandling of both the nor'easter and Irene.

== Meteorological history ==
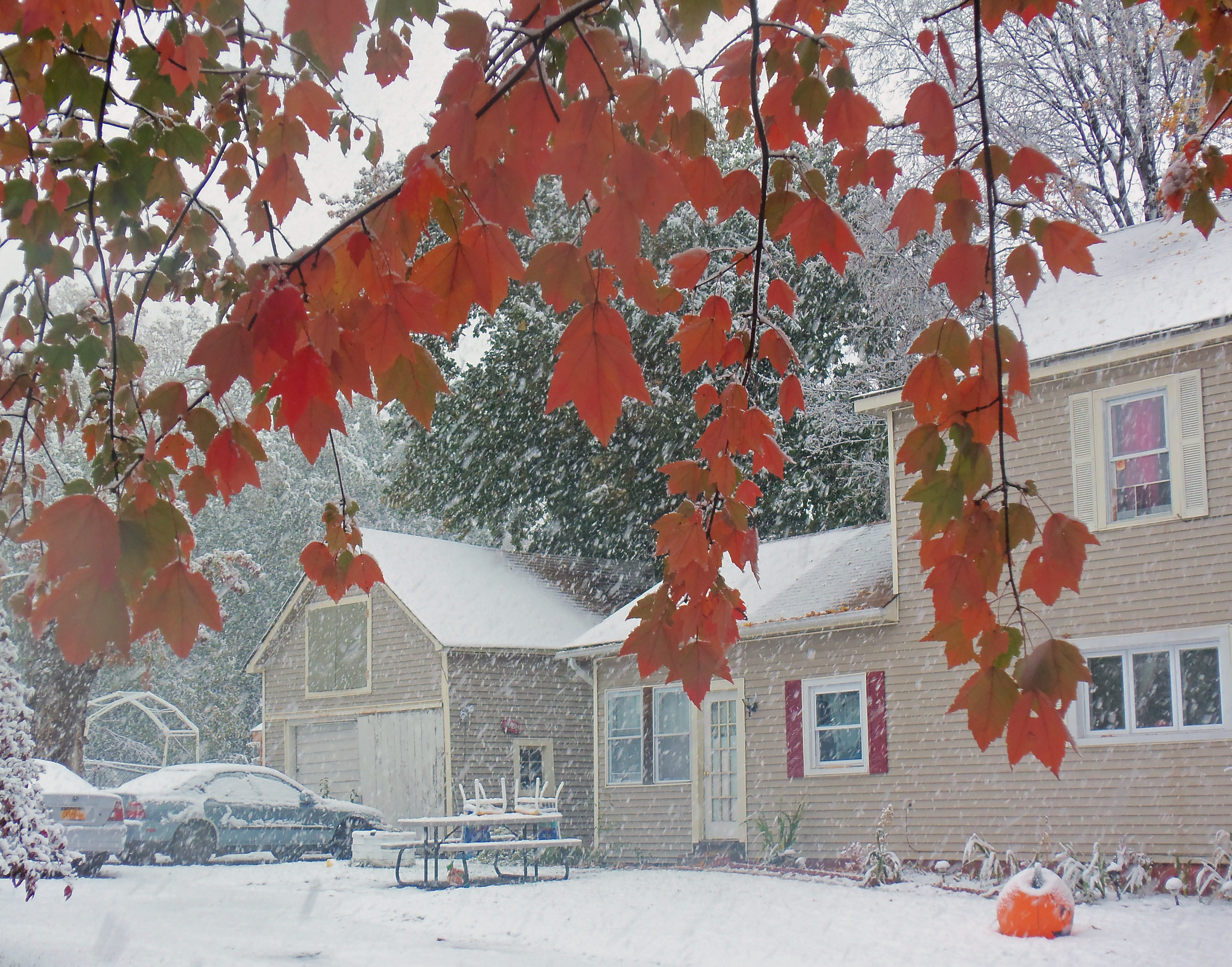
Snow falling on autumn leaves in Walden, NY

Early on October 28, 2011, a ridge over Canada advected an unseasonably cold air mass across the Mid-Atlantic states and New England; at the same time, a surface low-pressure area began developing along the coast of Louisiana. A cold front moved eastward from the Ohio Valley and exited the East Coast of the United States, developing another low pressure area off the coast of the Carolinas on October 29. The remnants of Hurricane Rina had also been absorbed into the developing system. At the same time, an area of precipitation extended from South Carolina through Pennsylvania, mostly falling as rain with some snow observed at higher elevations. By late that morning, the system was producing precipitation over much of the Mid-Atlantic and New England.

As the system moved to the northeast through the day, it produced widespread snow and winds near hurricane-strength north of the cyclone's warm front over the open waters of the Atlantic Ocean. Winds as high as 69 mph (111 km/h) were observed in Massachusetts, and the National Weather Service, issued a Hurricane Force Wind Warning for the Gulf of Maine and other high seas off New England. Overnight into October 30, the storm passed south of Nantucket, and it moved over Nova Scotia later that day with a barometric pressure of 975 mb (28.8 inHg). As it did so, the associated precipitation diminished over New England and moved into Atlantic Canada. As the system moved out into the Atlantic Ocean, it reached a minimum barometric pressure of 971 mb (28.7 inHg) as it passed to the east of the island of Newfoundland late on October 31. By the early morning of November 1, the system had fully moved out to sea. The storm then hit the UK as Cyclone Quinn.

== Preparations ==
Before the storm was at its strongest, local National Weather Service offices issued winter storm warnings from northwestern Virginia through central New England, as well as winter storm watches from central Maryland through central Maine. Officials anticipated peak snowfall totals to be from 8–10 inches (20–25 cm) across much of the region. All warnings were canceled after the storm moved away from the region.

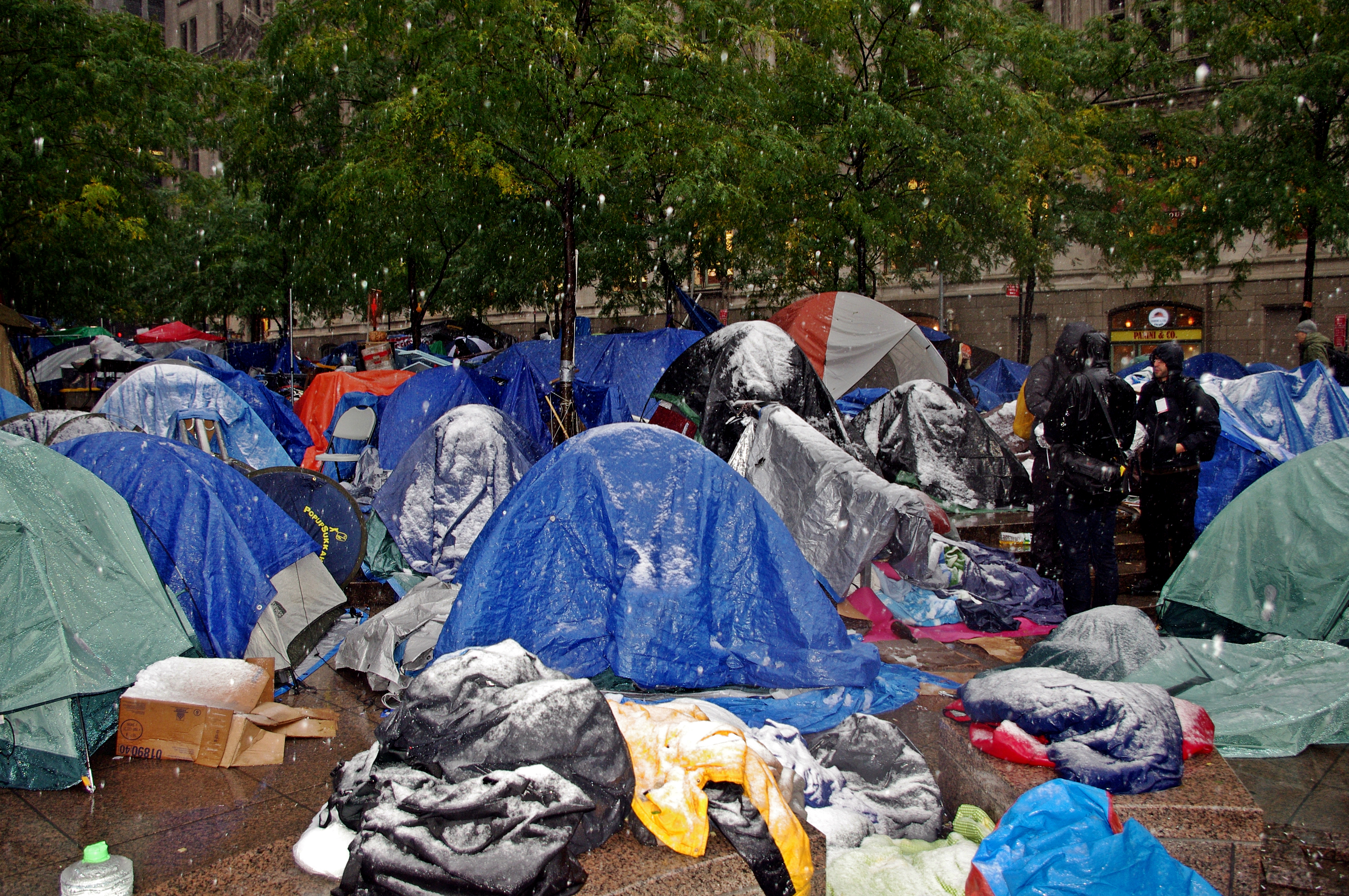
Snow falling on Occupy Wall Street

Early on October 29, the Pennsylvania Department of Transportation activated their fleet of salt trucks. In eastern Pennsylvania, the most recent significant snowstorm during October was in 1972. Utility crews prepared additional crews in the event of power outages. The Delaware Water Gap National Recreation Area closed a road due to the storm's threat. Connecticut governor Dan Malloy opened the state's Emergency Operations Center in Hartford, which included members of the transportation, health, and energy departments. Officials opened 41 shelters in Connecticut. Occupy Wall Street protesters pledged to remain in Lower Manhattan's Zucotti Park despite the weather, obtaining coats and blankets.

== Snowfall totals and records ==
Precipitation began falling in North Carolina and Virginia late on October 28. By early the next day, measurable snowfall had been reported from West Virginia through Maryland, and eventually as far north as Maine. The deepest snowfall reported was 32.0 in (81 cm), at Peru, Massachusetts. At least 20 cities reported record-breaking totals, and the peak of 19 in (48 cm) in West Milford, New Jersey broke that state's record for highest snowfall in October. Newark, New Jersey's largest city, also broke its all-time October snowfall record with 5.2 in (13 cm). Central Park in Manhattan observed 2.9 in (7.4 cm), also a record. In fact, this was New York City's 3rd October snowfall on record. Hartford, Connecticut's state capital, observed a record 12.3 in (31 cm), and the highest total in the state was 24.0 in (61 cm) in Farmington southwest of Hartford; this, too, broke the state record for an October snowfall.

In Massachusetts, the nor'easter brought wind gusts peaking at 69 mph (111 km/h) in Barnstable and, unofficially, 76 mph (122 km/h) in Provincetown. An automated marine weather station at Mount Desert Rock off the coast of Maine recorded a top gust of 77.2 mph (124.2 km/h). In Concord, New Hampshire this became the largest 24 hour snowstorm on record.

Effects by state or province
State/Province	Deaths	Power outages	Maximum Snowfall
Connecticut	10	830,000	24.0 inches (61 cm)
Maine	0	160,000	20.0 inches (51 cm)
Maryland	0	43,000	11.6 inches (29 cm)
Massachusetts	6	420,000	32.0 inches (81 cm)
New Brunswick	3	3,500	N/A
New Hampshire	0	315,000	31.4 inches (80 cm)
New Jersey	8	700,000	19.0 inches (48 cm)
New York	3	300,000	21.6 inches (55 cm)
Nova Scotia	0	40,000	1.2 inches (3.0 cm)
Pennsylvania	8	500,000	16.0 inches (41 cm)
Prince Edward Island	1	3,000	1.4 inches (3.6 cm)
Rhode Island	0	20,000	6.6 inches (17 cm)
Vermont	0	7,500	16.0 inches (41 cm)
Virginia	0	>4,000	9.0 inches (23 cm)
West Virginia	0	43,000	14.0 inches (36 cm)
Total	39	>3,385,000	32.0 inches (81 cm)

== Impact ==
The nor'easter storm became the 14th multibillion-dollar weather-related disaster of 2011, breaking the three-year-old record of nine. Across the Northeast, the combination of high winds and wet, heavy snow downed trees, most of which retained their leaves, did extensive damage. In New York City, a thousand trees were estimated to have fallen in Central Park, far more than had been damaged by Hurricane Irene two months earlier, just as had been reported in Connecticut. The New York Botanical Garden in the Bronx reported that 2,200 trees in the Thain Family Forest, its old-growth forest and the only one remaining in the city from the era prior to European colonization, were damaged. Downed trees caused widespread power outages, leaving over 3 million people without power. In Central Park workers put a priority on making the park safe for the annual New York City Marathon the following weekend.

=== Fatalities ===
Traffic accidents killed at least six people. Two were electrocuted by downed power lines. Overall, there were 39 deaths.

=== Transportation ===
The storm affected transportation across the Northeast. Two rail services were closed in the New York area, and Amtrak service across the region was either delayed or canceled. NJ Transit suspended service on the Morris and Essex Lines until November 1 due to downed wires and branches, and even then was only able to restore service as far west as Lake Hopatcong. North of New York City, Metro-North suspended commuter rail service on the Harlem Line north of North White Plains, leaving passengers marooned on a train at Southeast for 11 hours when fallen trees blocked the tracks in both directions. Service was also suspended on the Port Jervis Line and the New Canaan, Danbury and Waterbury branches of the New Haven Line. Service on the Port Jervis Line and electrified portions of the Harlem Line was restored on Monday; bus service replaced trains between Southeast and Wassaic and on the Danbury and Waterbury branches for the rest of the week.

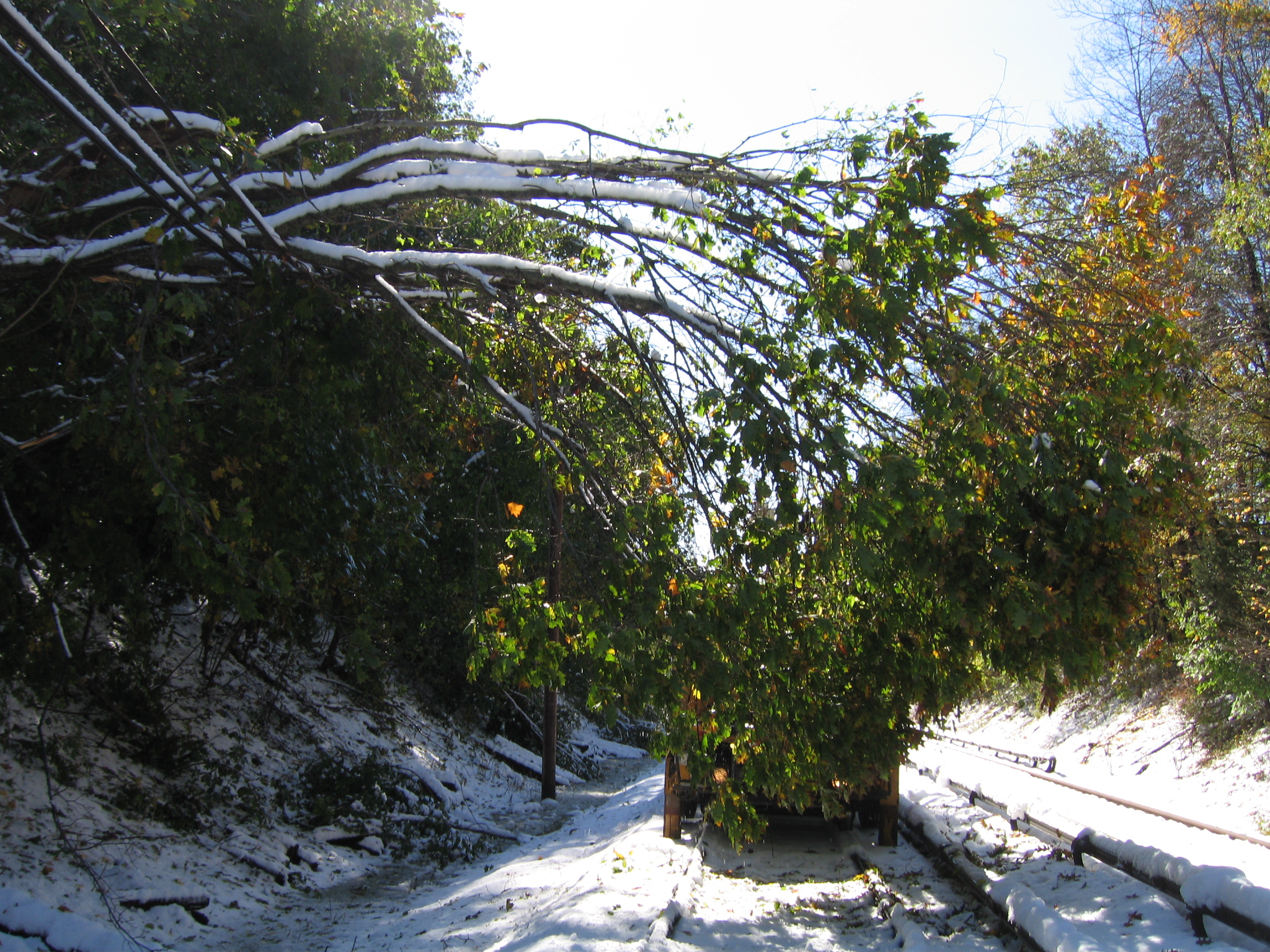
Downed tree on Metro-North's Harlem Line, north of New York City

The storm also disrupted air travel from Pennsylvania through Connecticut. Officials at Newark International Airport canceled all flights after 4 pm on October 29, and flights out of New York's two major airports were delayed by up to five hours. Some flights bound for New York were diverted to Hartford. Several JetBlue flights departing from Bradley International Airport there were stranded on the tarmac for up to seven hours due to the hazardous conditions. Teterboro Airport was closed due to the snow and ice.

Some roads were also affected. Along the Jersey Shore, the nor'easter produced coastal flooding that left Ventnor Heights isolated. Officials closed a portion of the Black Horse Pike in West Atlantic City due to flooding. Further north, the flooding closed five New Jersey state highways in Monmouth and Ocean counties. In New York, motorists were stranded for up to 12 hours on the Taconic State Parkway due to the snowfall.

=== Sports ===
Sporting events on Saturday, mostly college and high school football games, were also impacted. Penn State officials limited parking at its home game in State College to 1,500 spaces due to the inclement weather. It was the first Nittany Lions home October football game with measurable snow since record-keeping began in 1896. At West Point, New York, Army defeated Fordham 55–0 in its first home game played in snow since 1985. On Long Island where a windswept mixture of heavy snow and rain fell, a match between Plainview – Old Bethpage John F. Kennedy High School and Valley Stream Central High School was cancelled after 15 players were treated for hypothermia, prompting the former school district to reconsider game cancellation policies. At another football game on Long Island 10 players were checked and some treated for the condition. Several players at Farmingdale High School reported extreme fatigue for several weeks following playing in the storm.

=== Halloween ===
Many traditional Halloween activities were affected by the storm. In communities without electricity, where tree limbs and wires were down, trick-or-treating was delayed until days when it was expected to be back and repairs had made the streets safer. This also occurred in communities where electricity was still fully or partially on but the streets still may have been unsafe. In Sleepy Hollow, New York, a popular destination for the holiday since Washington Irving's classic short story, "The Legend of Sleepy Hollow" is set there, Halloween events were canceled due to the storm and its aftermath. On the other hand, another popular Halloween destination, Salem, Massachusetts, location of the 1692 witch trials, was unaffected due to its minimal snowfall.

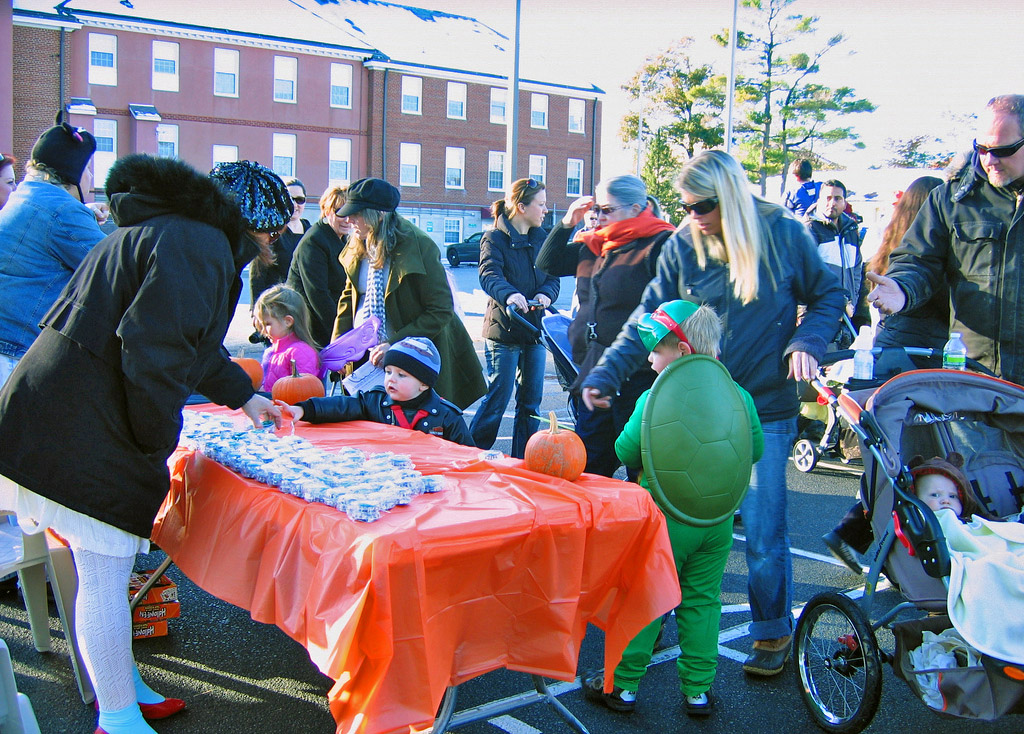
A post-storm Halloween event in Pequannock, New Jersey

Some families were able to compensate for the lost Halloween. They took their children to trick-or-treat in other communities that still had electricity. Residents of Glen Rock, New Jersey, organized a "trunk-or-treat" party at the local high school's football field, where children went around to parked sport-utility vehicles. Since many schools had snow days, and there was little to distract children without electricity, many parents insisted on going ahead with the holiday. "You can't cancel Halloween," said a woman in Fairfield, New Jersey. "The kids are all hyped up. They had no school because there's no electricity and this and that." A boy in Lexington, Massachusetts said he now planned to "buy some candy and eat it myself."

At UMass Amherst, the storm caused a power outage over a traditional party weekend at the college that lasted throughout most of the night on Saturday, October 29. While power was largely restored by Sunday, October 30, the campus canceled classes on October 31, and the UMass Campus Center served as a rest location for students and area residents who were still without power. Amherst College saw similar conditions, with the university newspaper reporting that students were taking refuge from power outages in Valentine Dining Hall, with one student describing the response as similar to hurricanes in her home state of Florida.

Proposals in some communities to hold Halloween the following weekend, or whenever conditions returned to normal, met with protest from some parents. Some considered the October 31 date to be immutable and non-negotiable, so children would have to wait for 2012. "I don't have control over the calendar, so Halloween is on Halloween, which is the 31st", said Pat Murphy, mayor of New Milford, Connecticut. She noted the town had managed to celebrate the holiday that day on its village green despite considerable storm damage and continued power outages. Others had already allowed their children some trick-or-treating, and did not want them to indulge in candy a second time within the week.

Many school districts were forced by the storm to use up their remaining allotted snow days for the school year, after Hurricane Irene and Tropical Storm Lee had required some be used near the beginning of the year. The Weston, Connecticut, public schools had already used nine snow days as of November 2, five more than its schedule allowed. Since more snow days would inevitably be used during the upcoming winter, they predicted that vacation periods planned for later in the year would have to be shortened or canceled, or the school year would have to be extended.

The storm came at a critical time for high school seniors preparing college applications for early decision, and 76 colleges and universities moved those deadlines back to compensate. In Connecticut, Weston High School, which had power, opened its library for students wishing to study or work on their applications; movies were shown in the auditorium.

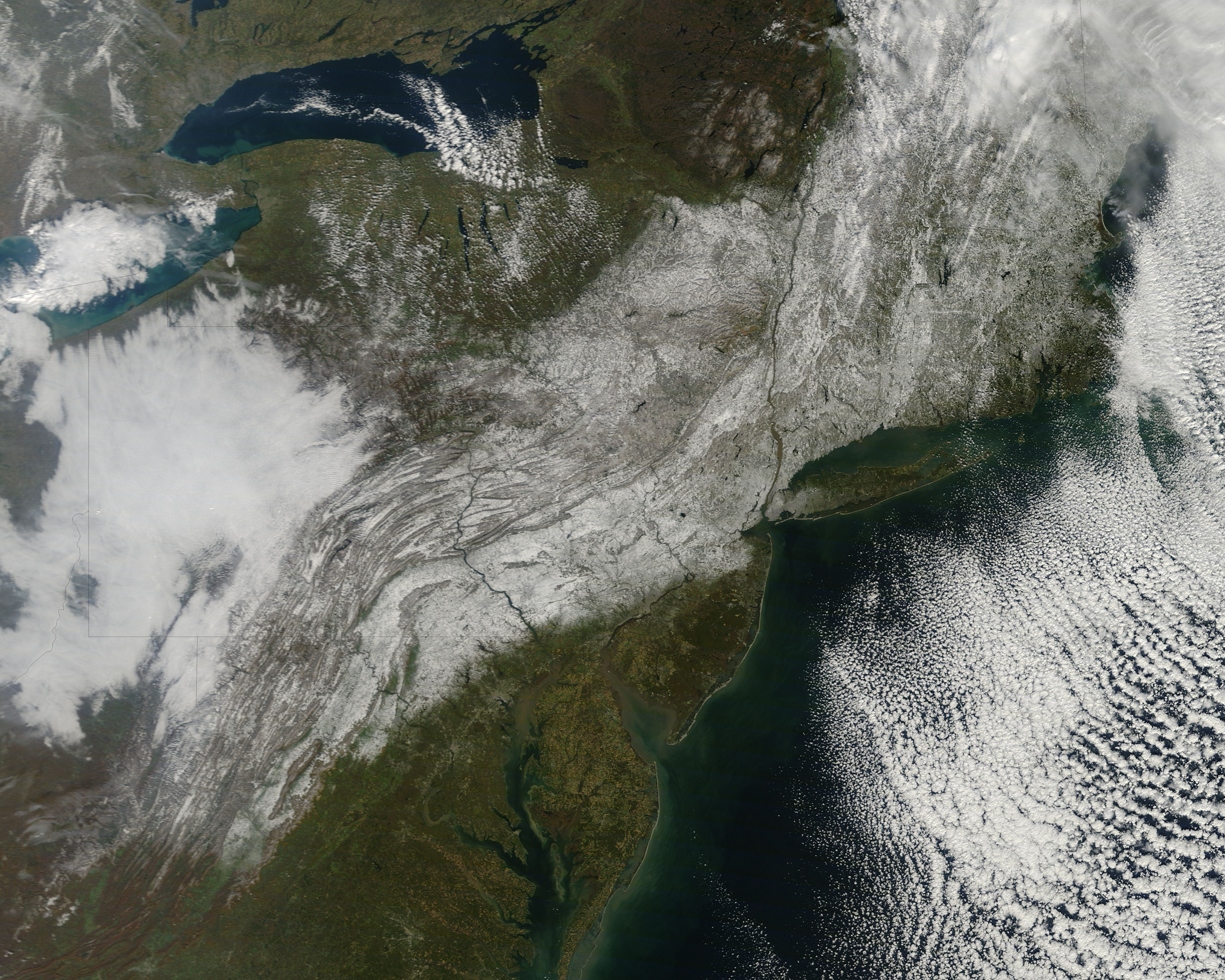
Satellite image of snowfall on Oct. 30.

=== Electrical outages ===
Approximately 1.7 million customers in the Northeast were still without electricity three days after the storm. Temperatures in the region warmed up to above 50 °F (10 °C) during the day, but went down to near freezing at night. As powerless houses grew cold, residents bundled up and kept under blankets, went to stay or visit with others who had electricity, or used their car heaters to temporarily warm-up. Some, frustrated by long blackouts after other recent storms, considered leaving the region or moving to cities where power lines were underground. About half a million households in New Jersey lost electricity, prompting a state of emergency declaration from governor Chris Christie. He had himself suffered outages both at his personal residence in Mendham and the governor's mansion, Drumthwacket, in Princeton.

In Connecticut, Governor Dannel Malloy declared a state of emergency late on October 29, after 830,000 people lost power, breaking the record set after Hurricane Irene. In the Danbury area, outages were so prolonged that seven school districts had to cancel classes for the following week. A state of emergency was also declared in Massachusetts, which allowed for the activation of the state's National Guard as well as other emergency measures. Due to the power outages and downed trees shortly before Halloween, at least three towns in the state advised delaying trick-or-treating. In New Hampshire, officials opened seven shelters for people who lost heating during the storm. The early snowfall allowed for the opening of ski resorts in Vermont and Maine.

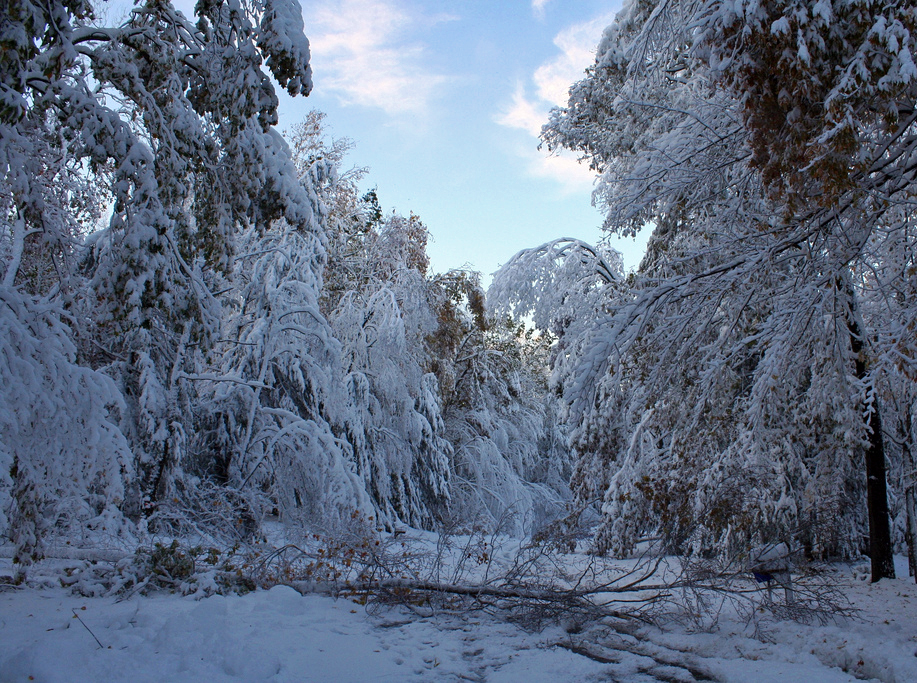
Downed and bent trees blocking a road the morning after the storm in Granby, Connecticut

At a November 1 press conference, Governor Malloy estimated that damages in Connecticut would exceed $3 billion. Two days later, close to 700,000 homes and businesses remained without power. A week after the storm, almost 150,000 customers of the state's two utilities had not yet had power restored. Customers still suffering outages continued to cope as best they could, by sleeping at the homes of friends who had already had their electricity restored, taking showers at work and storing perishable foods outside. Power was not restored to all the customers who had lost it in the storm until November 9.

Many Connecticut residents were angry with the state's electric utilities, particularly Connecticut Light & Power (CL&P), which serves most of the state, for the long delays in restoring service. By the weekend after the storm, in comparison, most customers in other affected states had already gotten their electricity back. Malloy said they had "missed their own target" and ordered an investigation into their preparation and restoration efforts to be led by James Lee Witt, director of the Federal Emergency Management Agency during the Clinton Administration. An Avon man complained he had not seen any crews in his area since the storm. Some commentators felt Malloy was being too lenient with CL&P, noting that the company had cut its maintenance budget in the preceding year and that smaller public utilities, such as that serving the city of Norwich, had experienced far less power loss and for far less time despite CL&P's customers paying the highest rates in the contiguous United States. Similar complaints had been made after the company had taken a long time to restore service after Hurricane Irene, and three weeks after the nor'easter, Jeff Butler, the company's CEO, resigned.

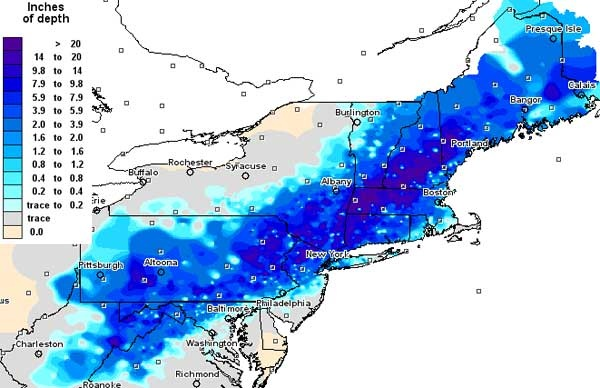
Snowfall totals from the nor'easter

A month after the storm, Malloy released Witt's report, which concluded that "CL&P was not prepared for an event of this size". The utility had planned for a worst-case scenario in which 100,000 customers lost power, only one-eighth of those actually affected by the nor'easter. While the report noted that such a storm had not hit in 25 years when the company's emergency plan was drawn up in June, it nevertheless faulted CL&P for merely telling its emergency crews to be on call that weekend, instead of having them wait at predetermined locations. As a result, it was harder to mobilize them when the effects turned out to be far worse than they anticipated despite warnings from the NWS using terms such as "historic" and "catastrophic" prior to the storm.

The report also said that CL&P did not ask for crews from neighboring states until after the storm, at which point other New England utilities were also seeking help from them. "Because of that poor preparation, it's not surprising that they didn't, or that they couldn't, respond with enough boots on the ground when the worst-case scenario was compounded by a factor of eight", said Malloy. The report did praise some aspects of CL&P's response, such as its short call wait times, speedy repairs by crews once they reached their job sites and the absence of death or serious injury among responding utility crews.

== See also ==
- 1991 Perfect Storm – A historic nor'easter that formed 20 years prior
- 1991 Halloween blizzard
- November 2012 nor'easter
