= Ulysses Prentiss Hedrick =

American botanist (1870–1951)

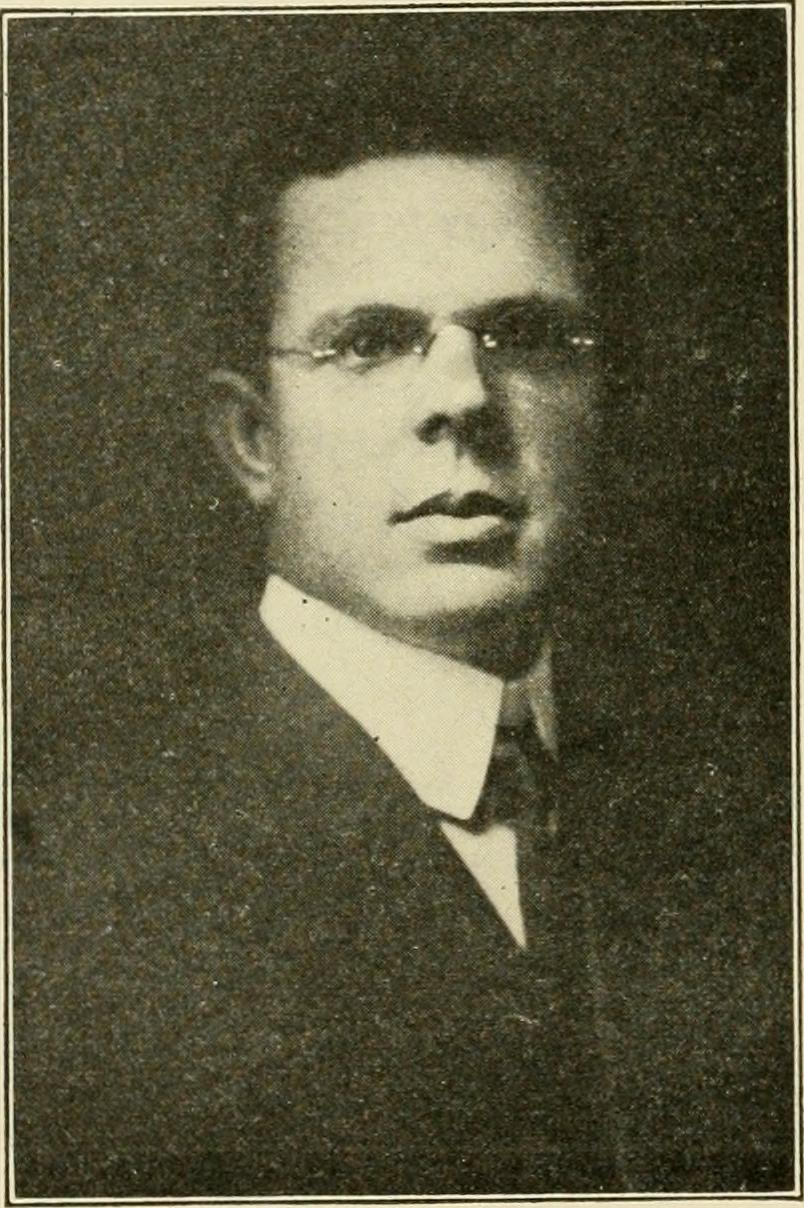
- Born: 1870; Independence, Iowa
- Died: 1951 (aged 80–81)
- Education: Michigan State Agricultural College; Hobart College
- Scientific career
- Fields: Pomology
- Workplaces: Michigan State Agricultural College; Oregon Agricultural College; Utah Agricultural College; NYS Agricultural Experiment Station
- Author abbrev. (botany): Hedrick

Ulysses Prentiss Hedrick (1870–1951) was an American botanist and horticulturist.

His main interest was cultivated fruit trees and he published a number of volumes dealing with such fruits as cherries, grapes, plums, and peaches.

== Biography ==
Hedrick was born in 1870 in Independence, Iowa. He grew up in Northern Michigan near Harbor Springs, an experience recalled in his memoir The Land of the Crooked Tree, and was the brother of Wilbur Olin Hedrick. He attended Michigan State Agricultural College (MSAC), now Michigan State University, receiving a Bachelor of Science degree in 1893 and a Master of Science degree in 1895. He worked as Assistant Horticulturist at MSAC from 1893 to 1895, while studying for his M.S.

From 1895 to 1905, Hedrick taught botany and horticulture at Oregon Agricultural College (1895–1897), Utah Agricultural College (1897–1899), and Michigan State Agricultural College (1899–1905). He became a horticulturist at the New York State Agricultural Experiment Station in Geneva, New York in 1905. While in Geneva, Hedrick was awarded an honorary Doctor of Science (Sc.D.) degree at Hobart College in 1913. He continued to work at the Station, which he directed from 1928 onwards, until 1937, when he retired.

Hedrick was made a Fellow of the American Association for the Advancement of Science in 1911, and of the New York State Historical Association and a member of the American Society for Horticultural Science (president 1913) and American Pomological Society.

During his lifetime, he authored or co-authored more than a dozen publications, which are "still frequently consulted", on the subjects of pomology and horticulture. His monographs on fruits, including publications such as The Pears of New York (1922), "have become classic references on the fruit cultivars of the period".

Hedrick died in 1951.

== Publications ==
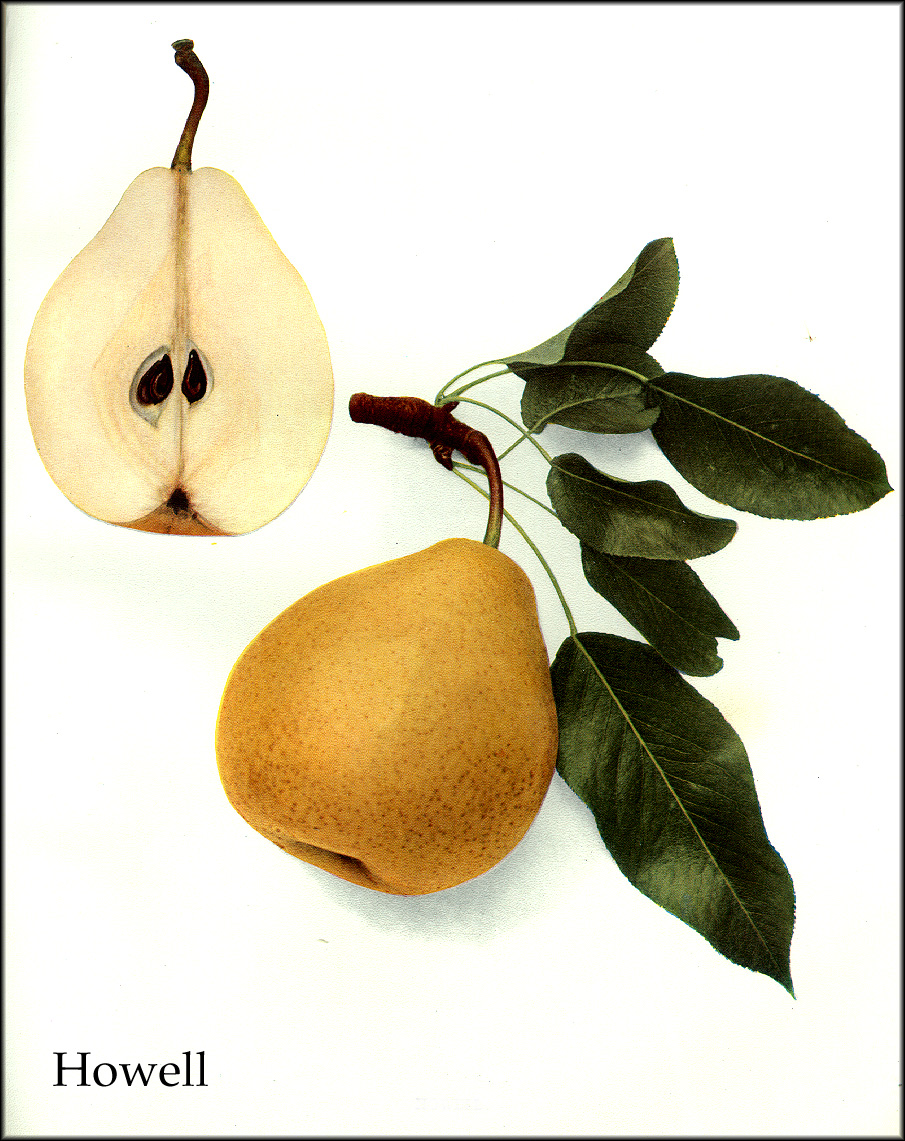
Pear cultivar "Howell" as illustrated on a color plate from Hedrick's 1922 monograph The Pears of New York

- Grapes of New York (1908)
- Plums of New York (1911)
- Cherries of New York (1915)
- Peaches of New York (1917)
- Manual of American Grape Growing (1919)
- Sturtevant's Notes on Edible Plants (1919)
- Cyclopedia of Hardy Fruits (1921)
- The Pears of New York (1921)
- Systematic Pomology (1925)
- Small Fruit of New York (1925)
- The Vegetables of New York (1929)
- History of Agriculture in the State of New York (1933)
- Fruits for the Home Garden (1944)
- The Land of the Crooked Tree (1948)
- Grapes and Wines from Home Vineyards (1945)
- A History of Horticulture in America (1950)
