= Katherine Marbury Scott =

Katherine Marbury Scott (born approx.1607-1610, died 1687) was a Quaker advocate and colonist of the Massachusetts Bay Colony. Like her older sister, Anne Hutchinson, she was persecuted by the Puritans when her open opposition to Puritan authorities disturbed the patriarchal order of the colony.

== Early life and education ==
Katherine Marbury was born in London, England between 1607 and 1610, and was one of at least 15 children of Bridget Dryden and Francis Marbury. Marbury was an educator, cleric, and political dissident, and died in 1611, when Katherine was still an infant. Unusually for the era, the Marbury daughters were taught to read and write, and Katherine was likely educated by one of her older siblings: Susan (the only surviving child of Marbury's first marriage to Elizabeth Moore), Anne, Francis, Emme, Erasmus, Bridget, Jeremuth, Elizabeth, Thomas, and Anthony.

== Biography ==
In 1632, Katharine married Richard Scott, and in 1634, they joined Anne and William Hutchinson in following Rev. John Cotton to the eastern part of the Massachusetts Bay Colony, consisting of Wampanoag, Narragansett, and Massachusett land. The Scotts initially settled in Salem, then followed dissident preacher Roger Williams to Providence, Rhode Island. In 1636, in the Antinonian Controversy, Anne Hutchinson’s semi-public preaching led to her condemnation by the authorities.

In 1637, Anne was accused of heresy. During her trial, she shocked authorities by declaring, “You have no power over my body, neither can you do me any harm—for I am in the hands of the eternal Jehovah, my Saviour… Therefore take heed how you proceed against me—for I know that, for this you go about to do to me, God will ruin you and your posterity and this whole state.” For her rebelliousness, she was imprisoned, then banished from the colony as “a woman not fit for our society.”

In 1638, Governor John Winthrop reported that “a sister of Mrs. Hutchinson, the wife of one Scott, being infected with Anabaptistry, and going last year to live in Providence, Mr. Williams was taken (or rather emboldened) by [Anne] to make open profession thereof....” In the 1650s, Katherine and her husband converted to Quakerism, and are thought to be the first Quaker converts in New England. After her sister's banishment, she knew the risks of challenging the Puritan orthodoxy. Still, she petitioned Winthrop for an end to the persecution of Quakers in the colony. The three prisoners she cited included Christopher Holder, who was engaged to her daughter, Mary Scott.

== Imprisonment ==
In 1658, Winthrop ordered that the three Quakers were to have their ears cut off as a warning. Katherine and her daughters risked their lives by protesting, with Katherine confronting Governor Endecott in person and telling him he would go to hell for his "barbarous act." Katherine was imprisoned for three weeks, publicly stripped to the waist, and given “Ten Cruel Stripes with a threefold corded knotted Whip.” Her daughters, sixteen year old Mary and eleven year old Patience, were imprisoned for a month for taking separate actions in support of imprisoned Quakers. It is possible that they harbored Quaker fugitive Mary Dyer, who was hanged in 1660, as she was known to have been taken in by two sisters in Providence with the surname of Scott.

Like Anne Hutchinson, Dyer was accused of having a monstrous birth, which was used by the authorities as a sign of unfeminine wickedness. Anne, a midwife, assisted Mary Dyer during her labor, and authorities explicitly connected the stillbirths of Anne and Mary to the fact that they "had vented misshapen opinions, so she must bring forth deformed monsters... And those [opinions] were public, and not in a corner mentioned.” Katherine may have been a midwife, as well, given that her mother, Bridget Dryden, taught midwifery to her daughters.

When asked if she was prepared to face the death penalty, Katherine replied, “If God calls us, woe be to us if we come not, and I question not but he whom we love will make us not to count our lives dear unto ourselves for the sake of his name."

In 1660, Katherine escorted Mary and Christopher to be married in England, safe from persecution. She returned to Providence the same year and lived there until her husband’s death in 1679. Katherine moved to Newport to live with Patience, whose married name was Patience Scott Beere, and stayed in Newport until her death on May 2, 1687.
