= Anne Hutchinson =

English-born religious figure (1591–1643)

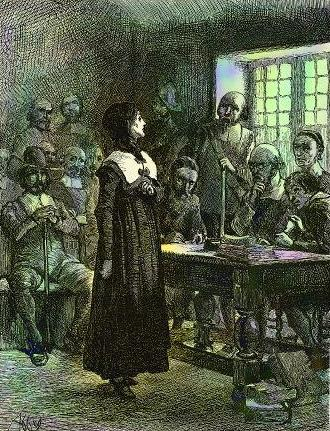
- Anne Hutchinson on Trial
- Born: Anne Marbury; Alford, Lincolnshire, England
- Baptised: 20 July 1591
- Died: August 1643 (aged 52); New Netherland
- Occupation: Midwife
- Known for: Role in the Antinomian Controversy
- Spouse: William Hutchinson (m. 1612; died 1641)
- Children: 15, including Edward, Faith, Bridget and Susanna
- Parents: Francis Marbury (father); Bridget Dryden (mother)

Anne Hutchinson (née Marbury; July 1591 – August 1643) was an English-born religious figure who emigrated with her family from England to the New World. She was an important participant in the Antinomian Controversy that shook the nascent Massachusetts Bay Colony from 1636 to 1638. Her strong religious formal declarations were at odds with the established Puritan clergy in the Boston area and her popularity and charisma helped create a theological schism that threatened the Puritan religious community there.

She was eventually tried and convicted, and banished from the colony along with many of her supporters. Five years after her banishment, she and several members of her family and household were killed in a massacre committed by Native Americans in New Netherland, where the household had moved.

Hutchinson was born in Alford, Lincolnshire, the daughter of Francis Marbury and his wife. He was an Anglican cleric and school teacher who gave her a far better education than most other girls received. She lived in London as a young adult, and there married a friend from home, William Hutchinson. The couple moved back to Alford where they began following the preacher John Cotton in the large, nearby port of Boston, Lincolnshire.

Cotton was compelled to emigrate in 1633. The Hutchinsons followed a year later with their 15 children and soon became well established in the growing settlement of Boston in New England. Soon she was hosting women at her house weekly, providing commentary on recent sermons. These meetings became so popular that she began offering meetings for men as well, including the young governor of the colony, Henry Vane the Younger.

Hutchinson began to accuse the local ministers (except for Cotton and her husband's brother-in-law, John Wheelwright) of preaching a covenant of works rather than a covenant of grace. Many ministers began to complain about her increasingly blatant accusations, as well as certain unorthodox theological teachings. The situation eventually erupted into what is commonly called the Antinomian Controversy.

This culminated in her 1637 trial for heresy, conviction, and banishment from the colony. Hutchinson and many of her supporters established the settlement of Portsmouth, Rhode Island with encouragement from Providence Plantations founder Roger Williams.

After her husband's death a few years later, threats of Massachusetts annexing Rhode Island compelled Hutchinson to move south, outside the reach of Boston. She moved to the lands under nominal Dutch control. In August 1643, Hutchinson, six of her children, and other household members were killed by Siwanoy people during Kieft's War. Only her nine-year-old daughter Susanna was spared, but taken captive by the Siwanoy.

Hutchinson is a key figure in the history of religious freedom in England's American colonies and the history of women in ministry, challenging the authority of the male ministers. She is honored by Massachusetts with a State House monument calling her a "courageous exponent of civil liberty and religious toleration". Historian Michael Winship, author of two books about her, has called her "the most famous—or infamous—English woman in colonial American history".

== Life in England ==
=== Childhood ===
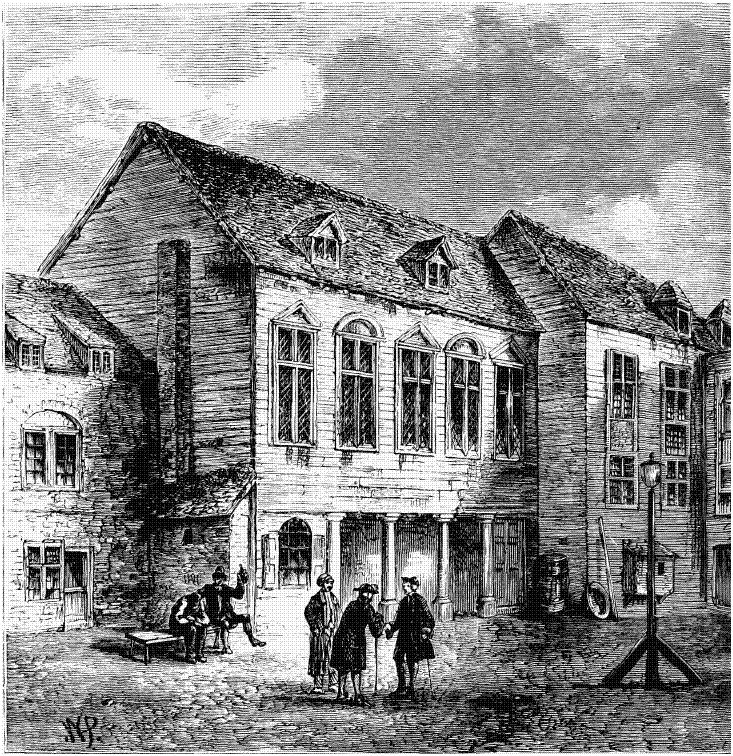
Marshalsea Prison, London, where Hutchinson's father was detained for two years for "heresy"

Anne Hutchinson was born Anne Marbury to parents Francis Marbury and Bridget Dryden in Alford, Lincolnshire, England, and baptised there on 20 July 1591. Her father was an Anglican cleric in London with strong Puritan leanings, who felt strongly that a clergy should be well educated and clashed with his superiors on this issue. Marbury's repeated challenges to the Anglican authorities led to his censure and imprisonment several years before Anne was born. In 1578, he was given a public trial, of which he made a transcript from memory during a period of house arrest.

For his conviction of heresy, Marbury spent two years in Marshalsea Prison on the south side of the River Thames across from London. In 1580, at the age of 25, he was released and was considered sufficiently reformed to preach and teach. He moved to the remote market town of Alford in Lincolnshire, about 140 miles (230 km) north of London. Hutchinson's father was soon appointed curate (assistant priest) of St Wilfrid's Church, Alford, and in 1585 he also became the schoolmaster at the Alford Free Grammar School, one of many such public schools, free to the poor and begun by Queen Elizabeth I. About this time, Marbury married his first wife, Elizabeth Moore, who bore three children, then died. Within a year of his first wife's death, Marbury married Bridget Dryden, about 10 years younger than he and from a prominent Northampton family. Her brother Erasmus was the grandfather of John Dryden, the playwright and Poet Laureate. Anne was the third of 15 children born to this marriage, 12 of whom survived early childhood. The Marburys lived in Alford for the first 15 years of Anne's life, and she received a better education than most girls of her time, with her father's strong commitment to learning, and she also became intimately familiar with scripture and Christian tenets. Education at that time was offered almost exclusively to boys and men. One possible reason why Marbury taught his daughters may have been that six of his first seven children were girls. Another reason may have been that the ruling class in Elizabethan England began realising that girls could be schooled, looking to the example of the queen, who spoke six foreign languages.

In 1605 when Hutchinson was 15, her family moved from Alford to the heart of London, where her father was given the position of vicar of St Martin Vintry. Here his expression of Puritan views was tolerated, though somewhat muffled, because of a shortage of clergy. Marbury took on additional work in 1608, preaching in the parish of St Pancras, Soper Lane, several miles northwest of the city, travelling there by horseback twice a week. In 1610, he replaced that position with one much closer to home and became rector of St Margaret, New Fish Street, a short walk from St Martin Vintry. He was at a high point in his career, but he died suddenly at the age of 55 in February 1611, when Anne was 19 years old.

=== Adulthood: following John Cotton ===
The year after her father's death, Anne Marbury, aged 21, married William Hutchinson, a familiar acquaintance from Alford who was a fabric merchant then working in London. The couple was married at St Mary Woolnoth Church in London on 9 August 1612, shortly after which they moved back to their hometown of Alford.

Soon they heard about an engaging minister named John Cotton who preached at St Botolph's Church in the large port of Boston, about 21 miles (34 km) from Alford. Cotton was installed as minister at Boston the year that the Hutchinsons were married, after having been a tutor at Emmanuel College in Cambridge. He was 27 years old, yet he had gained a reputation as one of the leading Puritans in England. Once the Hutchinsons heard Cotton preach, the couple made the trip to Boston as often as possible, enduring the ride by horseback when the weather and circumstances allowed. Cotton's spiritual message was different from that of his fellow Puritans, as he placed less emphasis on one's behaviour to attain God's salvation and more emphasis on the moment of religious conversion "in which mortal man was infused with a divine grace." Anne Hutchinson was attracted to Cotton's theology of "absolute grace", which caused her to question the value of "works" and to view the Holy Spirit as "indwelling in the elect saint". This allowed her to identify as a "mystic participant in the transcendent power of the Almighty"; such a theology was empowering to women, according to Eve LaPlante, whose status was otherwise determined by their husbands or fathers.

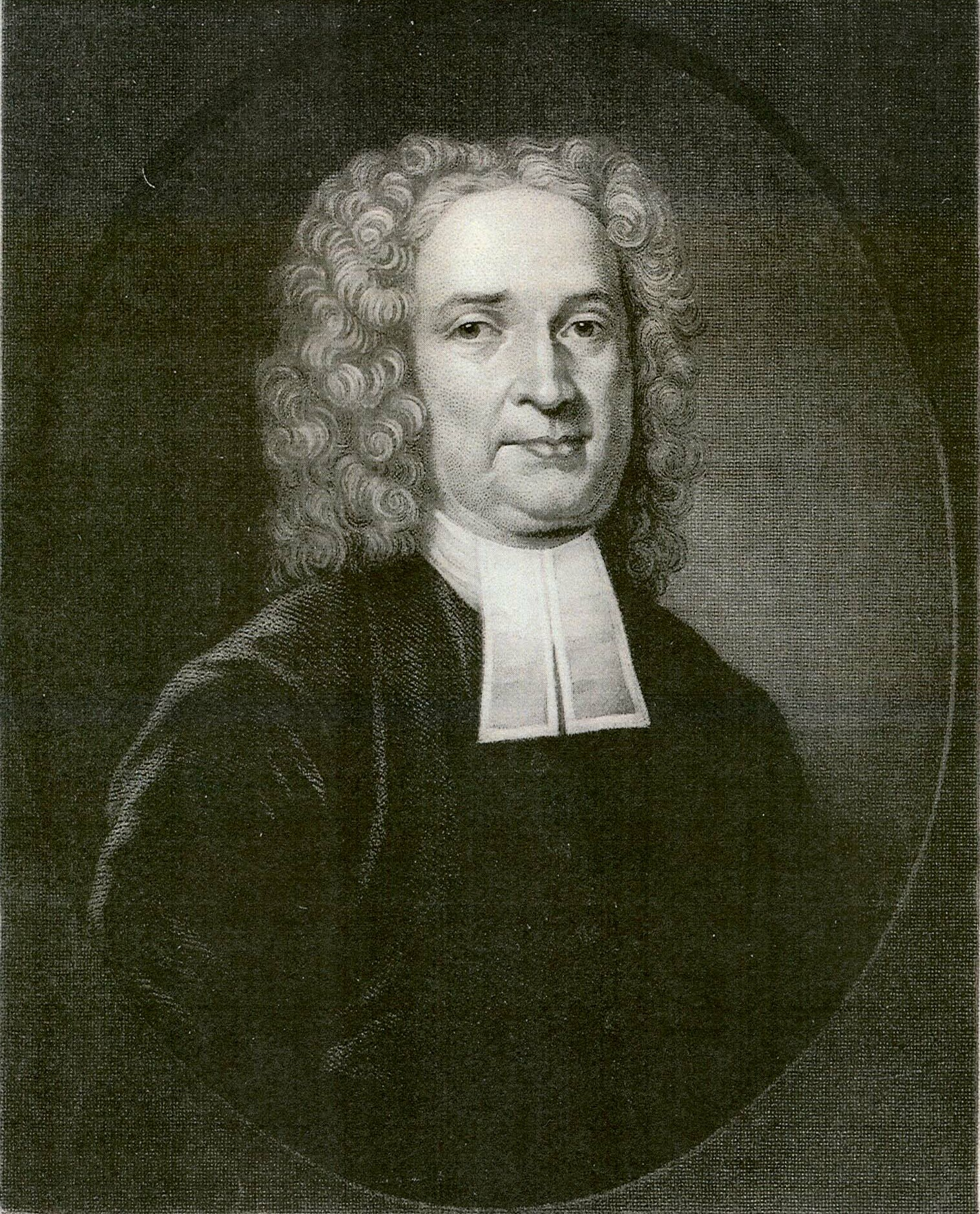
Reverend John Cotton was Hutchinson's mentor and her reason for emigrating to New England.

Another strong influence on Hutchinson was closer to her home in the nearby town of Bilsby. Her brother-in-law, the young minister John Wheelwright, preached a message like that of Cotton. As reformers, both Cotton and Wheelwright encouraged a sense of religious rebirth among their parishioners, but their weekly sermons did not satisfy the yearnings of some Puritan worshippers. This led to the rise of conventicles, which were gatherings of "those who had found grace" to listen to sermon repetitions, discuss and debate scripture, and pray. These gatherings were particularly important to women because they allowed women to assume roles of religious leadership that were otherwise denied them in a male-dominated church hierarchy. Hutchinson was inspired by Cotton and by other women who ran conventicles, and she began holding meetings in her own home, where she reviewed recent sermons with her listeners, and provided her own explanations of the message.

The Puritans wanted to abolish the ceremony of the Church of England and govern their churches based on a consensus of the parishioners. They preferred to eliminate bishops appointed by the monarchs, choose their own church elders (or governors), and provide for a lay leader and two ministers—one a teacher in charge of doctrine, and the other a pastor in charge of people's souls. By 1633, Cotton's inclination toward such Puritan practices had attracted the attention of Archbishop William Laud, who was on a campaign to suppress any preaching and practices that did not conform to the practices of the established Anglican Church. In that year, Cotton was removed from his ministry, and he went into hiding. Threatened with imprisonment, he made a hasty departure for New England aboard the ship Griffin, taking his pregnant wife with him. During the voyage to the colonies, she gave birth to their child, whom they named Seaborn.

When Cotton left England, Anne Hutchinson described it as a "great trouble unto her," and said that she "could not be at rest" until she followed her minister to New England. Hutchinson believed that the Holy Spirit instructed her to follow Cotton to America, "impressed by the evidence of divine providence". She was well into her 14th pregnancy, however, so she did not travel until after the baby was born. With the intention of soon going to New England, the Hutchinsons allowed their oldest son Edward to sail with Cotton before the remainder of the family made the voyage. In 1634, 43-year-old Anne Hutchinson embarked on a journey by sailing from England with her 48-year-old husband William and their other ten surviving children, aged about eight months to 19 years. They sailed aboard the Griffin, the same ship that had carried Cotton and their oldest son a year earlier.

== Boston ==
William Hutchinson was successful in his mercantile business and brought a considerable estate with him to New England, arriving in Boston in the late summer of 1634. The Hutchinson family purchased a half-acre lot on the Shawmut Peninsula, now downtown Boston. Here they had a house built, one of the largest on the peninsula, with a timber frame and at least two stories. (The house stood until October 1711, when it was consumed in the great fire of Boston, after which the Old Corner Bookstore was built on the site.) The Hutchinsons soon were granted Taylor's Island in the Boston harbour, where they grazed their sheep, and they also acquired 600 acres (2.4 km^{2}) of land at Mount Wollaston, 10 miles (16 km) south of Boston in the area that later became Quincy. Once established, William Hutchinson continued to prosper in the cloth trade and made land purchases and investments. He became a town selectman and deputy to the General Court. Anne Hutchinson likewise fit into her new home with ease, devoting many hours to those who were ill or in need. She became an active midwife, and while tending to women in childbirth, she provided them with spiritual advice. The magistrate John Winthrop noted that "her ordinary talke was about the things of the Kingdome of God," and "her usuall conversation was in the way of righteousness and kindnesse."

=== Boston church ===
The Hutchinsons became members of the First Church in Boston, the most important church in the colony. With its location and harbour, Boston was New England's centre of commerce, and its church was characterised by Winthrop as "the most publick, where Seamen and all Strangers came". The church membership had grown from 80 to 120 during Cotton's first four months there. In his journal, Winthrop stated that "more were converted & added to that Churche, than to all the other Churches in the Baye." The historian Michael Winship noted in 2005 that the church seemed to approach the Puritan ideal of a Christian community. Early Massachusetts historian William Hubbard found the church to be "in so flourishing a condition as were scarce any where else to be paralleled." Winship considers it a twist of fate that the colony's most important church also had the most unconventional minister in Cotton. The more extreme religious views of Hutchinson did not stand out to any significant degree due to Cotton's divergence from the theology of his fellow ministers.

=== Home Bible study group ===
Hutchinson's visits to women in childbirth led to discussions along the lines of the conventicles in England. She soon began hosting weekly meetings at her home for women who wanted to discuss Cotton's sermons and hear her explanations and elaborations. Her meetings for women became so popular that she had to organise meetings for men, as well, and she was hosting 60 or more people per week. These gatherings brought women, as well as their husbands, "to enquire more seriously after the Lord Jesus Christ."

As the meetings continued, Hutchinson began offering her own religious views, stressing that only "an intuition of the Spirit" would lead to one's election by God, and not good works. Her theological interpretations began diverging from the more legalistic views found among the colony's ministers, and the attendance increased at her meetings and soon included Governor Henry Vane the Younger. Her ideas that one's outward behaviour was not necessarily tied to the state of one's soul became attractive to those who might have been more attached to their professions than to their religious state, such as merchants and craftsmen. The colony's ministers became more aware of Hutchinson's meetings, and they contended that such "unauthorised" religious gatherings might confuse the faithful. Hutchinson responded to this with a verse from Titus, saying that "the elder women should instruct the younger."

=== Antinomian Controversy ===
==== Tensions build ====
Hutchinson's gatherings were seen as unorthodox by some of the colony's ministers, and differing religious opinions within the colony eventually became public debates. The resulting religious tension erupted into what has traditionally been called the Antinomian Controversy, but has more recently been labelled the Free Grace Controversy.

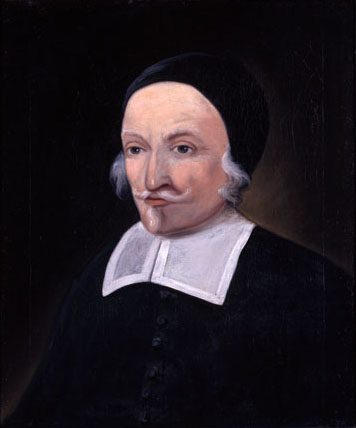
Reverend John Wheelwright was an ally of Hutchinson during the Antinomian Controversy, and both were banished.

The Reverend Zechariah Symmes had sailed to New England on the same ship as the Hutchinsons. In September 1634, he told another minister that he doubted Anne Hutchinson's orthodoxy, based on questions that she asked him following his shipboard sermons. This issue delayed Hutchinson's membership to the Boston church by a week, until a pastoral examination determined that she was sufficiently orthodox to join the church.

In 1635, a difficult situation occurred when senior pastor John Wilson returned from a lengthy trip to England where he had been settling his affairs. Hutchinson was exposed to his teaching for the first time, and she saw a big difference between her own doctrines and his. She found his emphasis on morality and his doctrine of "evidencing justification by sanctification" to be disagreeable. She told her followers that Wilson lacked "the seal of the Spirit." Wilson's theological views were in accord with all of the other ministers in the colony except for Cotton, who stressed "the inevitability of God's will" ("free grace") as opposed to preparation (works). Hutchinson and her allies had become accustomed to Cotton's doctrines, and they began disrupting Wilson's sermons, even finding excuses to leave when Wilson got up to preach or pray.

Thomas Shepard, the minister of Newtown (which later became Cambridge), began writing letters to Cotton as early as the spring of 1636. He expressed concern about Cotton's preaching and about some of the unorthodox opinions found among his Boston parishioners. Shepard went even further when he began criticising the Boston opinions to his Newtown congregation during his sermons. In May 1636, the Bostonians received a new ally when the Reverend John Wheelwright arrived from England and aligned himself with Cotton, Hutchinson, and other "free grace" advocates. Wheelwright had been a neighbour of the Hutchinsons in Lincolnshire, and his wife was a sister of Hutchinson's husband. Another boost for the free grace advocates came during the same month, when Vane was appointed as the governor of the colony. Vane was a strong supporter of Hutchinson, yet he also had his own ideas about theology that were considered not only unorthodox, but radical by some.

Hutchinson and the other free grace advocates continued to question the orthodox ministers in the colony. Wheelwright began preaching at Mount Wollaston, about ten miles south of the Boston meetinghouse, and his sermons began to answer Shepard's criticisms with his own criticism of the covenant of works. This mounting "pulpit aggression" continued throughout the summer, along with the lack of respect shown Boston's Reverend Wilson. Wilson endured these religious differences for several months before deciding that the affronts and errors were serious enough to require a response. He is the one who likely alerted Winthrop, one of his parishioners, to take notice. On or shortly after 21 October 1636, Winthrop gave the first public warning of the problem that consumed him and the leadership of the Massachusetts Bay Colony for much of the next two years. In his journal he wrote, "One Mrs. Hutchinson, a member of the church at Boston, a woman of a ready wit and a bold spirit, brought over with her two dangerous errors: 1. That the person of the Holy Ghost dwells in a justified person. 2. That no sanctification can help to evidence to us our justification." He went on to elaborate these two points, and the Antinomian Controversy began with this journal entry.

==== Ministerial confrontation ====
On 25 October 1636, seven ministers gathered at the home of Cotton to confront the developing discord; they held a "private conference" which included Hutchinson and other lay leaders from the Boston church. Some agreement was reached, and Cotton "gave satisfaction to them [the other ministers], so as he agreed with them all in the point of sanctification, and so did Mr. Wheelwright; so as they all did hold, that sanctification did help to evidence justification." Another issue was that some of the ministers had heard that Hutchinson criticised them during her conventicles for preaching a covenant of works and said they were not able ministers of the New Testament. Hutchinson responded to this only when prompted, and only to one or two ministers at a time. She believed that her response, which was largely coaxed from her, was private and confidential. A year later, her words were used against her in a trial that resulted in her banishment from the colony.

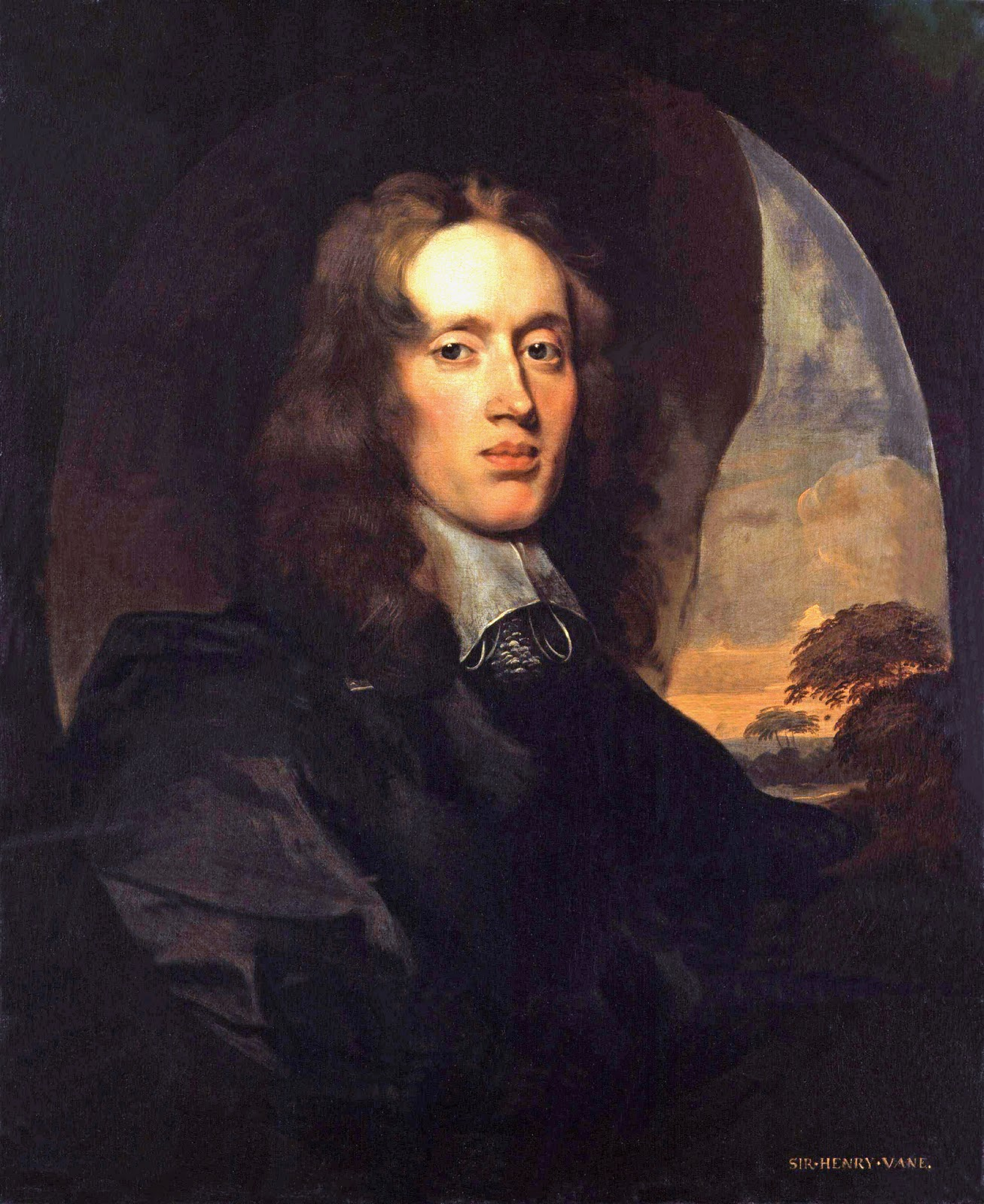
Governor Henry Vane strongly supported Hutchinson during the colony's difficulties.

By late 1636, as the controversy deepened, Hutchinson and her supporters were accused of two heresies in the Puritan church: antinomianism and familism. The word "antinomianism" literally means "against or opposed to the law"; in a theological context, it means "the moral law is not binding upon Christians, who are under the law of grace." According to this view, if one was under the law of grace, then moral law did not apply, allowing one to engage in immoral acts. Familism was named for a 16th-century sect called the Family of Love, and it involved one's perfect union with God under the Holy Spirit. Hutchinson and her supporters were sometimes accused of engaging in immoral behaviour or "free love" in order to discredit them, but such acts were antithetical to their doctrine. Hutchinson, Wheelwright, and Vane all took leading roles as antagonists of the orthodox party, but theologically, it was Cotton's differences of opinion with the colony's other ministers that was at the centre of the controversy.

By winter, the theological schism had become great enough that the General Court called for a day of fasting to help ease the colony's difficulties. During the appointed fast-day on Thursday, 19 January 1637, Wheelwright preached at the Boston church in the afternoon. To the Puritan clergy, his sermon was "censurable and incited mischief", but the free grace advocates were encouraged, and they became more vociferous in their opposition to the "legal" ministers. Governor Vane began challenging the doctrines of the colony's divines, and supporters of Hutchinson refused to serve during the Pequot War of 1637 because Wilson was the chaplain of the expedition. Ministers worried that the bold stand of Hutchinson and her supporters began to threaten the "Puritan's holy experiment." Had they succeeded, historian Dunn believes that they would have profoundly changed the thrust of Massachusetts history.

==== Events of 1637 ====
By March, the political tide began to turn against the free grace advocates. Wheelwright was tried for contempt and sedition that month for his fast-day sermon and was convicted in a close vote, but not yet sentenced. During the election of May 1637, Vane was replaced as governor by Winthrop; in addition, all the other Boston magistrates who supported Hutchinson and Wheelwright were voted out of office. By the summer of 1637, Vane sailed back to England, never to return. With his departure, the time was ripe for the orthodox party to deal with the remainder of their rivals.

The autumn court of 1637 convened on 2 November and sentenced Wheelwright to banishment, ordering him to leave the colony within 14 days. Several of the other supporters of Hutchinson and Wheelwright were tried and given varied sentences. Following these preliminaries, it was Anne Hutchinson's turn to be tried.

==== Civil trial: day 1 ====
Hutchinson was brought to trial on 7 November 1637, with Wheelwright banished and other court business settled. Winthrop presided over the trial, in which Hutchinson was charged with "traducing [slandering] the ministers". Winthrop also presented other charges against her, including the allegation that she "troubled the peace of the commonwealth and churches" by promoting and divulging opinions that had divided the community, and continuing to hold meetings at her home despite a recent synod that had condemned them.

The court, however, found it difficult to charge Hutchinson because she had never spoken her opinions in public, unlike Wheelwright and the other men who had been tried, nor had she ever signed any statements about them. Winthrop's first two lines of prosecution were to portray her as a co-conspirator of others who had openly caused trouble in the colony, and then to fault her for holding conventicles. Question by question, Hutchinson effectively stonewalled him in her responses, and Winthrop was unable to find a way to convert her known membership in a seditious faction into a convictable offence. Deputy governor Thomas Dudley had a substantial background in law, and he stepped in to assist the prosecution. Dudley questioned Hutchinson about her conventicles and her association with the other conspirators. With no answer by Hutchinson, he moved on to the charge of her slandering the ministers.

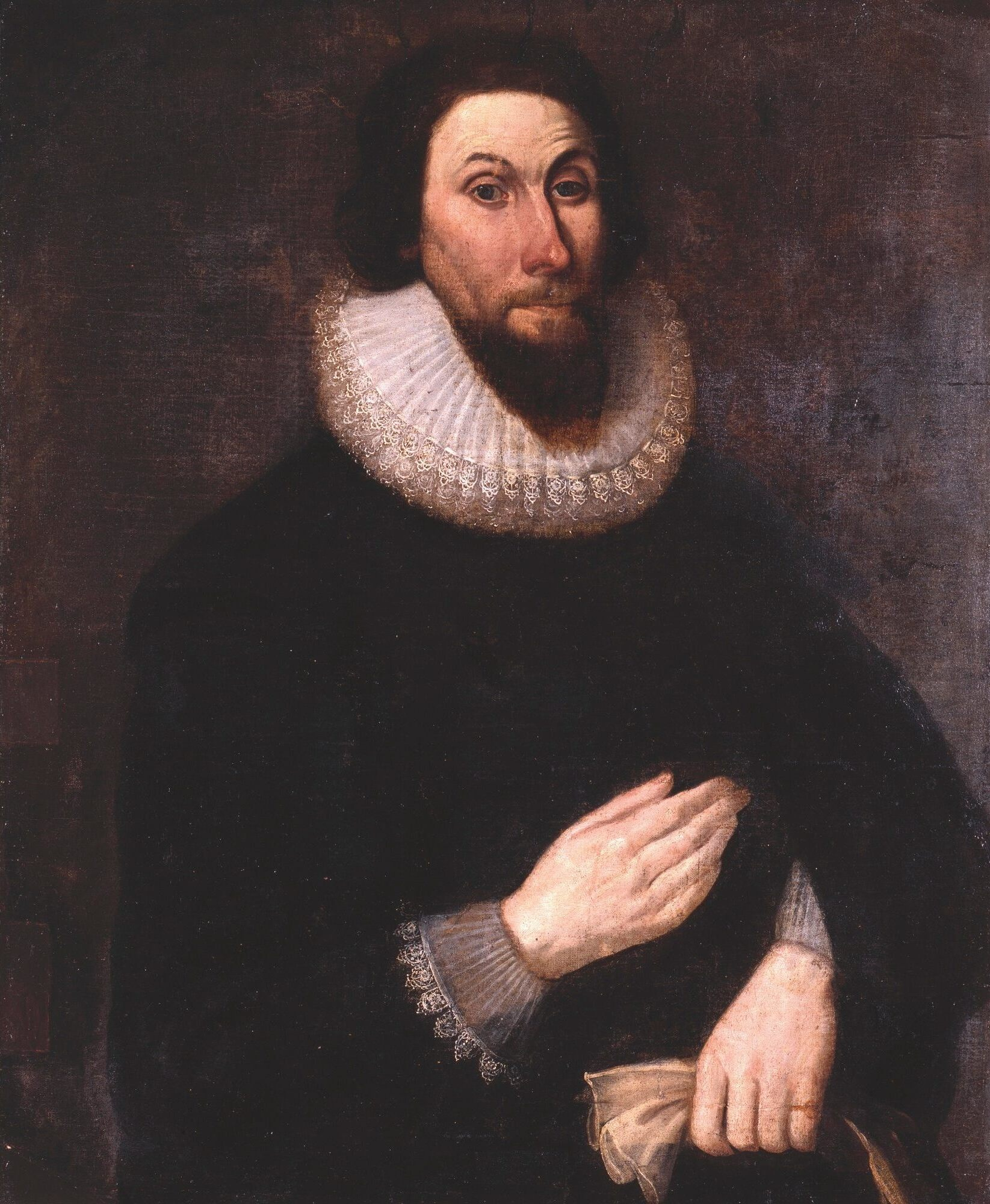
John Winthrop presided over Hutchinson's trial in 1637 as both accuser and judge.

The remainder of the trial was spent on this last charge. The prosecution intended to demonstrate that Hutchinson had made disparaging remarks about the colony's ministers, and to use the October meeting as their evidence. Six ministers had presented to the court their written versions of the October conference, and Hutchinson agreed with the substance of their statements. Her defence was that she had spoken reluctantly and in private, that she "must either speak false or true in my answers" in the ministerial context of the meeting. In those private meetings, she had cited Proverbs 29:25, "The fear of man bringeth a snare: but whoso putteth his trust in the Lord shall be safe." The court was not interested in her distinction between public and private statements.

At the end of the first day of the trial, Winthrop recorded, "Mrs. Hutchinson, the court you see hath labored to bring you to acknowledge the error of your way that so you might be reduced. The time now grows late. We shall therefore give you a little more time to consider of it and therefore desire that you attend the court again in the morning." The first day had gone fairly well for Hutchinson, who had held her own in a battle of wits with the magistrates. Biographer Eve LaPlante suggests, "Her success before the court may have astonished her judges, but it was no surprise to her. She was confident of herself and her intellectual tools, largely because of the intimacy she felt with God."

==== Civil trial: day 2 ====
During the morning of the second day of the trial, it appeared that Hutchinson had been given some legal counsel the previous evening, and she had more to say. She continued to criticise the ministers of violating their mandate of confidentiality. She said that they had deceived the court by not telling about her reluctance to share her thoughts with them. She insisted that the ministers testify under oath, which they were hesitant to do. Magistrate Simon Bradstreet said that "she would make the ministers sin if they said something mistaken under oath", but she answered that if they were going to accuse her, "I desire it may be upon oath."

There were three such witnesses, all from the Boston church: deacon John Coggeshall, lay leader Thomas Leverett, and Cotton. The first two witnesses made brief statements that had little effect on the court, but Cotton was questioned extensively. When Cotton testified, he tended not to remember many events of the October meeting, and attempted to soften the meaning of statements that Hutchinson was being accused of. He stressed that the ministers were not as upset about any Hutchinson remarks at the end of the October meeting as they appeared to be later. Dudley reiterated that Hutchinson had told the ministers that they were not able ministers of the New Testament; Cotton replied that he did not remember her saying that.

There was more parrying between Cotton and the court, but the exchanges were not picked up in the transcript of the proceedings. Hutchinson asked the court for leave to "give you the ground of what I know to be true." She then addressed the court with her own judgment:

You have no power over my body, neither can you do me any harm—for I am in the hands of the eternal Jehovah, my Saviour, I am at his appointment, the bounds of my habitation are cast in heaven, no further do I esteem of any mortal man than creatures in his hand, I fear none but the great Jehovah, which hath foretold me of these things, and I do verily believe that he will deliver me out of your hands. Therefore take heed how you proceed against me—for I know that, for this you go about to do to me, God will ruin you and your posterity and this whole state.

— Anne Hutchinson at trial

This was the "dramatic high point of the most analyzed event of the free grace controversy", wrote historian Michael Winship. Historians have given a variety of reasons for this statement, including an "exultant impulse", "hysteria", "cracking under the strain of the inquest", and being "possessed of the Spirit". Winship, citing the work of historian Mary Beth Norton, suggests that Hutchinson consciously decided to explain why she knew that the divines of the colony were not able ministers of the New Testament. This was "not histrionics, but pedagogy," according to Winship; it was Hutchinson's attempt to teach the Court, and doing so was consistent with her character.

==== Civil trial: verdict ====
Hutchinson simplified the task of her opponents, whose prosecution had been somewhat shaky. Her revelation was considered not only seditious, but also in contempt of court. Cotton was pressed by Dudley on whether or not he supported Hutchinson's revelation; he said that he could find theological justification for it. Cotton may have still been angry over the zeal with which some opponents had come after the dissidents within his congregation. Winthrop was not interested in this quibbling, though; he was using Hutchinson's bold assertions to lead the court in the direction of rewriting history, according to the historical interpretations of Winship. Many of the Puritans had been convinced that there was a single destructive prophetic figure behind all of the difficulties that the colony had been having, and Hutchinson had just become the culprit. Winthrop addressed the court, "if therefore it be the mind of the court, looking at [her] as the principal cause of all our trouble, that they would now consider what is to be done with her."

The Bostonians made a final effort to slow the proceedings. William Coddington rose, asserting, "I do not see any clear witness against her, and you know it is a rule of the court that no man may be a judge and an accuser too," ending with, "Here is no law of God that she hath broken nor any law of the country that she hath broke, and therefore deserve no censure." The court wanted a sentence but could not proceed until some of the ministers spoke. Three of the ministers were sworn in, and each testified against Hutchinson. Winthrop moved to have her banished; in the ensuing tally, only the Boston deputies voted against conviction. Hutchinson challenged the sentence's legitimacy, saying, "I desire to know wherefore I am banished." Winthrop responded, "The court knows wherefore and is satisfied."

Hutchinson was called a heretic and an instrument of the devil, and was condemned to banishment by the Court "as being a woman not fit for our society". The Puritans sincerely believed that, in banishing Hutchinson, they were protecting God's eternal truth. Winthrop summed up the case with genuine feeling:

Thus it pleased the Lord to heare the prayers of his afflicted people ... and by the care and indevour of the wise and faithfull ministers of the Churches, assisted by the Civill authority, to discover this Master-piece of the old Serpent.... It is the Lords work, and it is marvellous in our eyes.

==== Detention ====
Following her civil trial, Hutchinson was put under house arrest and ordered to be gone by the end of the following March. In the interim, she was not allowed to return home, but was detained at the house of Joseph Weld, brother of the Reverend Thomas Weld, located in Roxbury, about two miles from her home in Boston. The distance was not great, yet Hutchinson was rarely able to see her children because of the weather, which was particularly harsh that winter. Winthrop referred to Hutchinson as "the prisoner" and was determined to keep her isolated so that others would not be inspired by her, according to LaPlante. She was frequently visited by various ministers, whose intent, according to LaPlante, was to reform her thinking but also to collect evidence against her. Thomas Shepard was there to "collect errors", and concluded that she was a dangerous woman. Shepard and the other ministers who visited her drafted a list of her theological errors and presented them to the Boston church, which decided that she should stand trial for these views.

==== Church trial ====
Hutchinson was called to trial on Thursday, 15 March 1638, weary and in poor health following a four-month detention. The trial took place at her home church in Boston, though many of her supporters were gone. Her husband and other friends had already left the colony to prepare a new place to live. Her only family members present were her oldest son Edward and his wife, her daughter Faith and son-in-law Thomas Savage, and her sister Katherine with her husband Richard Scott.

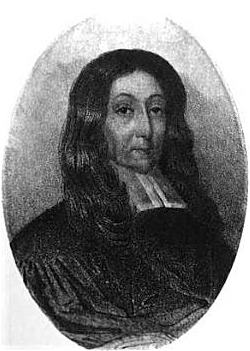
Reverend John Wilson had been ridiculed by Hutchinson; he made the final pronouncement of excommunication during her church trial.

The ministers intended to defend their orthodox doctrine and to examine Hutchinson's theological errors. Ruling elder Thomas Leverett was charged with managing the examination. He called Hutchinson and read the numerous errors with which she had been charged, and a nine-hour interrogation followed in which the ministers delved into some weighty points of theology. At the end of the session, only four of the many errors were covered, and Cotton was put in the uncomfortable position of delivering the admonition to his admirer. He said, "I would speake it to Gods Glory [that] you have bine an Instrument of doing some good amongst us... he hath given you a sharp apprehension, a ready utterance and abilitie to exprese yourselfe in the Cause of God." The ministers overwhelmingly concluded that Hutchinson's unsound beliefs outweighed all the good which she had done, and that she endangered the spiritual welfare of the community. Cotton continued,

You cannot Evade the Argument... that filthie Sinne of the Communitie of Woemen; and all promiscuous and filthie cominge togeather of men and Woemen without Distinction or Relation of Mariage, will necessarily follow. Though I have not herd, nayther do I thinke you have bine unfaythfull to your Husband in his Marriage Covenant, yet that will follow upon it.

Here Cotton was making a link between Hutchinson's theological ideas and the behavior antinomians and familists had been accused of, or associated with. He concluded:

Therefor, I doe Admonish you, and alsoe charge you in the name of Ch[rist] Je[sus], in whose place I stand... that you would sadly consider the just hand of God agaynst you, the great hurt you have done to the Churches, the great Dishonour you have brought to Je[sus] Ch[rist], and the Evell that you have done to many a poore soule.

With this, Hutchinson was instructed to return in one week on the next lecture day.

Cotton had not yet given up on his parishioner. With the permission of the court, Hutchinson was allowed to spend the week at his home, where the recently arrived Reverend John Davenport was also staying. All week, the two ministers worked with her and, under their supervision, she wrote out a formal recantation of her unsound opinions that had formerly brought objection. Hutchinson stood at the next meeting on Thursday, 22 March and read her recantation in a subdued voice to the congregation. She admitted to having been wrong about the soul and spirit, wrong about the resurrection of the body, wrong in prophesying the destruction of the colony, and wrong in her demeanour toward the ministers, and she agreed that sanctification could be evidence of justification (what she called a "covenant of works") "as it flowes from Christ and is witnessed to us by the Spirit". Had the trial ended there, she would likely have remained in good standing with the Boston church, and had the possibility of returning some day.

Wilson explored an accusation made by Shepard at the end of the previous meeting, and new words brought on new assaults. The outcome of her trial was uncertain following the first day's grilling, but her downfall came when she would not acknowledge that she held certain theological errors before her four-month imprisonment. With this, she was accused of lying but, even at this point, Winthrop and a few of the ministers wanted her soul redeemed because of her significant evangelical work before she "set forth her owne stuffe". To these sentiments, Shepard vehemently argued that Hutchinson was a "Notorious Imposter" in whose heart there was never any grace. He admonished the "heinousness of her lying" during a time of supposed humiliation.

Shepard had swayed the proceedings, with Cotton signalling that he had given up on her, and her sentence was presented by Wilson:

For as much as you, Mrs. Hutchinson, have highly transgressed and offended... and troubled the Church with your Errors and have drawen away many a poor soul, and have upheld your Revelations; and for as much as you have made a Lye.... Therefor in the name of our Lord Je[sus] Ch[rist]... I doe cast you out and... deliver you up to Satan... and account you from this time forth to be a Heathen and a Publican.... I command you in the name of Ch[rist] Je[sus] and of this Church as a Leper to withdraw your self out of the Congregation.

Hutchinson was now banished from the colony and removed from the congregation, and her leading supporters had been given three months to leave the colony, including Coddington and Coggeshall, while others were disenfranchised or dismissed from their churches. The court in November had ordered that 58 citizens of Boston and 17 from adjacent towns be disarmed unless they repudiated the "seditious label" given them, and many of these people followed Hutchinson into exile.

== Rhode Island ==
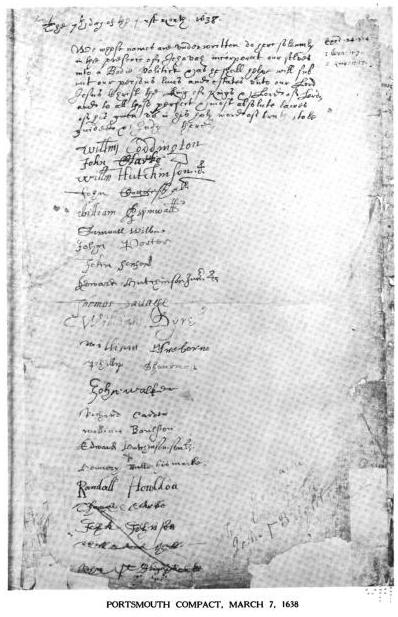
Portsmouth Compact

During Hutchinson's imprisonment, several of her supporters prepared to leave the colony and settle elsewhere. One such group of men, including her husband Will, met on 7 March 1638 at the home of wealthy Boston merchant William Coddington. Ultimately, 23 men signed what is known as the Portsmouth Compact, forming themselves into a "Bodie Politick [sic]" and electing Coddington as their governor, but giving him the Biblical title of "judge". Nineteen of the signers initially planned to move to New Jersey or Long Island, but Roger Williams convinced them to settle in the area of his Providence Plantations settlement. Coddington purchased Aquidneck Island (later named Rhode Island) in the Narragansett Bay from the Narragansetts, and the settlement of Pocasset was founded (soon renamed Portsmouth). Anne Hutchinson followed in April, after the conclusion of her church trial.

Hutchinson, her children, and others accompanying her travelled for more than six days by foot in the April snow to get from Boston to Roger Williams' settlement at Providence. They took boats to get to Aquidneck Island, where many men had gone ahead of them to begin constructing houses. In the second week of April, she reunited with her husband, from whom she had been separated for nearly six months.

=== Final pregnancy ===
That April after reuniting with her husband, Hutchinson became pregnant at almost 47 years old. In May 1638 she miscarried what her doctor John Clarke described as a handful of transparent grapes. This is known now as a hydatidiform mole, a condition occurring most often in women over 45, resulting from one or two sperm cells fertilizing a blighted egg. Historian Emery Battis, citing expert opinion, suggests that she may not have been pregnant at all during that time, but displaying acute symptoms of menopause. A woman could have had severe menopausal symptoms who had undergone a continuous cycle of pregnancies, deliveries, and lactations for 25 years, with the burdens of raising a large family and subjected to the extreme stress of her trials. The Puritan leaders of the Massachusetts Bay Colony gloated over Hutchinson's suffering and also that of Mary Dyer, a follower who had the premature and stillbirth of a severely deformed infant. The leaders classified the women's misfortunes as the judgment of God. Winthrop wrote, "She brought forth not one, but thirty monstrous births or thereabouts", then continued, "see how the wisdom of God fitted this judgment to her sin every way, for look—as she had vented misshapen opinions, so she must bring forth deformed monsters."

Massachusetts continued to persecute Hutchinson's supporters who stayed in the Boston area. Laymen were sent from the Boston church to Portsmouth to convince Hutchinson of her errors; she shouted at them, "the Church at Boston? I know no such church, neither will I own it. Call it the whore and strumpet of Boston, but no Church of Christ!"

=== Dissension in government ===
Less than a year after Pocasset was settled, Coddington who had openly supported Hutchinson following her trial, had become autocratic and began to alienate his fellow settlers. Early in 1639, Hutchinson became acquainted with Samuel Gorton, who attacked the legitimacy of the magistrates. On 28 April 1639, Gorton and a dozen other men ejected Coddington from power. William Hutchinson, Anne's husband was chosen as the new governor. Two days later, over 30 men signed a document forming a new "civil body politic". Winthrop noted in his journal that at Aquidneck;

the people grew very tumultuous and put out Mr. Coddington and the other three magistrates, and chose Mr. William Hutchinson only, a man of very mild temper and weak parts, and wholly guided by his wife, who had been the beginner of all the former troubles in the country and still continued to breed disturbance.

Coddington and several others left the colony, establishing the settlement of Newport at the south end of the island. The freemen of Pocasset changed the name of their town to Portsmouth. They adopted a new government which provided for trial by jury and separation of church and state. The men who accompanied Coddington to Newport tended to be the strongest leaders; several became presidents or governors of the entire united colony after 1646, such as Coggeshall, Nicholas Easton, William Brenton, Jeremy Clarke, and Henry Bull.

On 12 March 1640, the towns of Portsmouth and Newport agreed to re-unite. Coddington became governor of the island, and William Hutchinson was chosen as one of his assistants. The towns were to remain autonomous with laws made by the citizens.

During her time in Portsmouth, Hutchinson developed a new philosophy concerning religion. She persuaded her husband to resign from his position as a magistrate, as Roger Williams put it, "because of the opinion, which she had newly taken up, of the unlawfulness of magistracy."

Hutchinson's husband William died sometime after June 1641 at the age of 55. He was buried in Portsmouth. No record of his death exists as there was no established church, which would have been the customary repository for such records.

== New Netherland ==
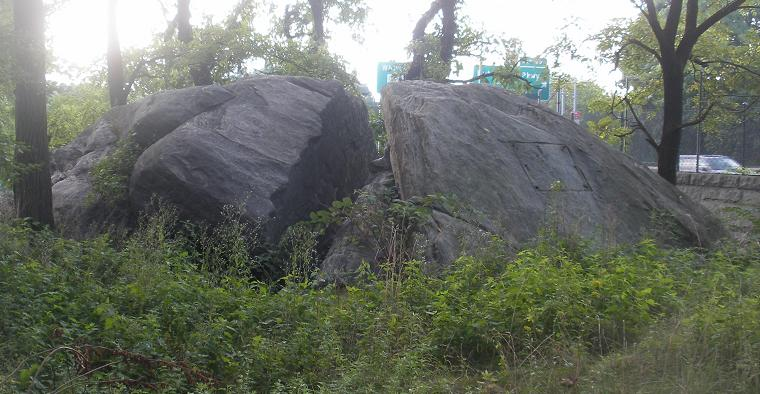
Split Rock, near where the Hutchinson family was massacred

Not long after the settlement of Aquidneck Island, the Massachusetts Bay Colony made threats to annex the entire Narragansett Bay area. To move out of the reach of the Bay colony and its sister colonies in Connecticut and New Haven, Hutchinson move into the jurisdiction of the Dutch in New Netherland some time after the summer of 1642. With her were seven of her children, a son-in-law, and several servants—16 total persons by several accounts. There they settled near an ancient landmark called Split Rock, not far from what became the Hutchinson River in northern Bronx, New York City. Other Rhode Island families were in the area, including the Throckmortons and the Cornells. By one account, Hutchinson bought her land from John Throckmorton (for whom Throggs Neck is named) who had earlier been a settler of Providence with Roger Williams, but was now living in New Netherland.

The Hutchinsons stayed in an abandoned house while a permanent house was being built with the help of James Sands, who had married Katherine Walker, a granddaughter of William Hutchinson's brother Edward. Sands later became a settler of Block Island (later New Shoreham, Rhode Island), and the Reverend Samuel Niles, another early settler of Block Island, recorded the following about Sands' experience in New Netherland:

Mrs. Hutchinson... removed to Rhode Island, but making no long stay there, she went further westward to a place called Eastchester, now in the eastern part of the province of New York, where she prepared to settle herself; but not to the good liking of the Indians that lived back in the woods, as the sequel proves. In order to pursue her purpose, she agreed with Captain James Sands, then a young man, to build her house, and he took a partner with him in the business... there came a company of Indians to the frame where he was at work, and made a great shout and sat down. After some time, they gathered up his tools, put his broad axe on his shoulders and his other tools into his hands, and made signs for him to go away. But he seemed to take no notice of them, but continued in his work.

Thus the indigenous people gave overt clues that they were displeased with a settlement being formed there. The property had purportedly been secured by an agent of the Dutch West India Company in 1640, however the negotiation was with members of the Siwanoy people in distant Norwalk, and the local natives likely had little to do with that transaction, if they even knew of it at all. Hutchinson was taking a considerable risk in putting a permanent dwelling at this site.

The exact location of the Hutchinson house is unknown. LaPlante hints in her biography of Hutchinson that the homestead was near the Indian Trail that went through modern-day Pelham Bay Park, on the east side of the Hutchinson River. Lockwood Barr offers another hypothesis, citing the extensive land title research of Otto Hufeland published by the Westchester Historical Society in 1929. He concluded that the site of the homestead was on the west side of the Hutchinson River in Eastchester. A map in Barr's book that appeared in the 1929 work shows the property bordering the river in an area that is now called Baychester, between two creeks called Rattlesnake Brook and Black Dog Brook. This area of the Bronx is now highly developed; Rattlesnake Brook is extant, mostly in underground culverts, but Black Dog Brook is defunct.

=== Death ===
Prior to their arrival in 1642, the land occupied by the Hutchinson family had been subject to dispute between the native tribes and the colonists. The Director of New Netherland, Willem Kieft, had ordered an unauthorized attack on Siwanoy in an effort to drive them from the region. This among other ongoing conflicts sparked the Kieft's War (1643-1645). Kieft was so brutal in his attacks the complaints were made to Holland by some of the settlers to have him replaced. In one account,"Young children, some of them snatched from their mothers, were cut in pieces before the eyes of their parents, and the pieces were thrown into the fire or into the water; other babes were bound on planks and then cut through, stabbed and miserably massacred so that it would break a heart of stone." In August of 1643, the Hutchinson family became casualties of Kieft's War.

LaPlante summarized as:

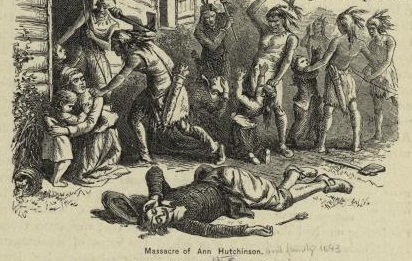
Massacre of the Hutchinsons

The Siwanoy warriors stampeded into the tiny settlement above Pelham Bay, prepared to burn down every house. The Siwanoy chief, Wampage, who had sent a warning, expected to find no settlers present. But at one house the men in animal skins encountered several children, young men and women, and a woman past middle age. One Siwanoy indicated that the Hutchinsons should restrain the family's dogs. Without apparent fear, one of the family tied up the dogs. As quickly as possible, the Siwanoy seized and scalped Francis Hutchinson, William Collins, several servants, the two Annes (mother and daughter), and the younger children—William, Katherine, Mary, and Zuriel. As the story was later recounted in Boston, one of the Hutchinsons' daughters, "seeking to escape," was caught "as she was getting over a hedge, and they drew her back again by the hair of the head to the stump of a tree, and there cut off her head with a hatchet."

The warriors then dragged the bodies into the house, along with the cattle, and burned the house to the ground. During the attack, Hutchinson's nine-year-old daughter Susanna was out picking blueberries; she was found, according to legend, hidden in the crevice of Split Rock nearby. She is believed to have had red hair, which was unusual to the Indians, and perhaps because of this curiosity her life was spared. She was taken captive, was named "Autumn Leaf" by one account, and lived with the Indians for two to six years (accounts vary) until ransomed back to her family members, most of whom were living in Boston.

The first definitive record of the occurrence was in Winthrop's journal, where it was the first entry made for the month of September, though not dated. It took days or even weeks for Winthrop to receive the news, so the event almost certainly occurred in August 1643.

The reaction in Massachusetts to Hutchinson's death was harsh. The Reverend Thomas Weld wrote, "The Lord heard our groans to heaven, and freed us from our great and sore affliction.... I never heard that the Indians in those parts did ever before this commit the like outrage upon any one family or families; and therefore God's hand is the more apparently seen herein, to pick out this woeful woman". Peter Bulkley, the pastor at Concord, wrote, "Let her damned heresies, and the just vengeance of God, by which she perished, terrify all her seduced followers from having any more to do with her leaven."

Wampage claimed to have slain Hutchinson, and legend has it that he assumed her name after the massacre, calling himself "Anne Hoeck" to be honored by using the name of his most famous victim. Eleven years after the event, he confirmed a deed transferring the Hutchinsons' property to Thomas Pell, with his name on the document being given as "Ann Hoeck alias Wampage."

== Historical impact ==
Hutchinson claimed that she was a prophetess, receiving direct revelation from God. In this capacity, she prophesied during her trial that God would send judgment upon the Massachusetts Bay Colony and would wipe it from existence. She further taught her followers that personal revelation from God was as authoritative in a person's life as the Bible, a teaching that was antithetical to Puritan theology. She also claimed that she could identify "the elect" among the colonists. These positions ultimately caused Cotton, Winthrop, and other former friends to view her as an antinomian heretic.

According to modern historian Michael Winship, Hutchinson is famous, not so much for what she did or said during the Antinomian Controversy, but for what Winthrop made of her in his journal and in his account of the controversy called the Short Story. According to Winship, Hutchinson became the reason in Winthrop's mind for all of the difficulties the colony had experienced, though unfairly, and with her departure, any other lingering issues were swept under the carpet. Winthrop's account has given Hutchinson near legendary status and, as with all legends, what she stood for has shifted over the centuries. Winthrop described her as "a woman of ready wit and bold spirit". In the words of Winship, to Winthrop, Hutchinson was a "hell-spawned agent of destructive anarchy". The close relationship between church and state in Massachusetts Bay meant that a challenge to the ministers was interpreted as challenge to established authority of all kinds. To 19th century America, she was a crusader for religious liberty, as the nation celebrated its new achievement of the separation of church and state. Finally, in the 20th century, she became a feminist leader, credited with terrifying the patriarchs, not because of her religious views but because she was an assertive woman. According to feminist Amy Lang, Hutchinson failed to understand that "the force of the female heretic vastly exceeds her heresy". Lang argues that it was difficult for the court to pin a crime on her; her true crime in their eyes, according to Lang's interpretation, was the violation of her role in Puritan society, and she was condemned for undertaking the roles of teacher, minister, magistrate, and husband. (However, the Puritans themselves stated that the threat which they perceived was entirely theological, and no direct mention was ever made to indicate that they were threatened by her gender.)

Winship calls Hutchinson "a prophet, spiritual adviser, mother of fifteen, and important participant in a fierce religious controversy that shook the infant Massachusetts Bay Colony from 1636 to 1638", upheld as a symbol of religious freedom, liberal thinking, and Christian feminism. Anne Hutchinson is a contentious figure, having been lionised, mythologised, and demonised by various writers. In particular, historians and other observers have interpreted and re-interpreted her life within the following frameworks: the status of women, power struggles within the Church, and a similar struggle within the secular political structure. As to her overall historical impact, Winship writes, "Hutchinson's well-publicized trials and the attendant accusations against her made her the most famous, or infamous, English woman in colonial American history."

== Memorials and legacy ==
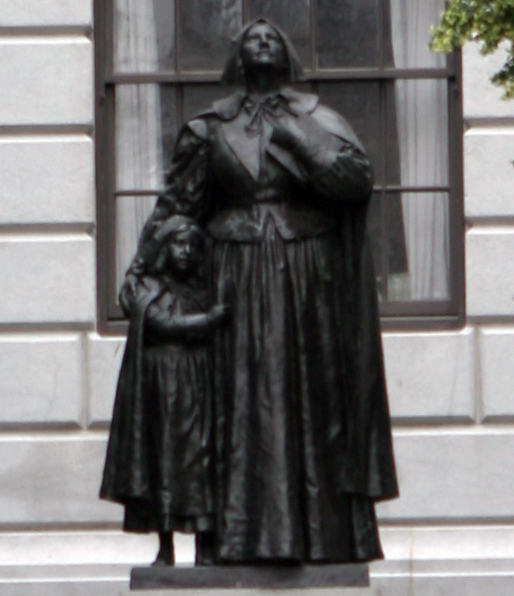
Statue of Anne Hutchinson at Massachusetts State House by Cyrus Edwin Dallin

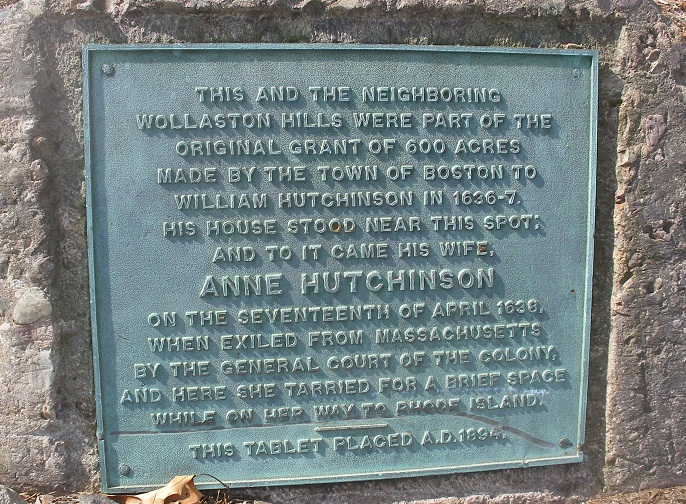
Anne Hutchinson historical plaque at Hutchinson Square, Quincy, Massachusetts, near where the Hutchinsons had a farm

In front of the State House in Boston, Massachusetts, stands a statue of Anne Hutchinson with her daughter Susanna as a child by Cyrus Dallin. The memorial is featured on the Boston Women's Heritage Trail. Dallin also used this image in the Signing of the Mayflower Compact bas relief in Provincetown, Massachusetts. Another memorial to Hutchinson was erected south of Boston in Quincy, Massachusetts, at the corner of Beale Street and Grandview Avenue. This is near the location where the Hutchinsons owned a 600-acre (2.4 km^{2}) farm with a house, and this is where they stayed for several days in early spring 1638 while making the trip from Boston to their new home on Aquidneck Island. Another memorial is erected in Founders' Brook Park in Portsmouth, RI. The park features marble stones inscribed with quotes taken from Hutchinson's trial. Anne Hutchinson was inducted into the National Women's Hall of Fame in 1994.

=== Literary works ===
According to Hutchinson biographer Eve LaPlante, some literary critics trace the character of Hester Prynne in Nathaniel Hawthorne's The Scarlet Letter to Hutchinson's persecution in the Massachusetts Bay Colony. Historian Amy Lang wrote that Hester Prynne was the embodiment of a fictional Anne Hutchinson—a Hutchinson created by the early Puritan chroniclers. Lang notes that Hester was what orthodox Puritans said Hutchinson was, either in reality or at least spiritually. The parallel is that Hutchinson was the heretic who metaphorically seduced the Puritan community, while in Hawthorne's novel Hester Prynne literally seduced the minister of her community.

Hawthorne noted that The Scarlet Letter was inspired by John Neal's 1828 novel Rachel Dyer, in which Hutchinson's fictional granddaughter is a victim of the Salem witch trials. Hutchinson appears in the opening chapters as a martyr connected to the later martyrs of the witch hysteria.

Anne Hutchinson and her political struggle with Governor Winthrop are depicted in the 1980 play Goodly Creatures by William Gibson. Other notable historical characters who appear in the play include Cotton, Vane, and Dyer. In January 2014, Dan Shore's opera Anne Hutchinson, with libretto by William A. Fregosi and Fritz Bell, was performed twice in Boston, Massachusetts, by the Intermezzo Opera Company.

=== Namesakes ===
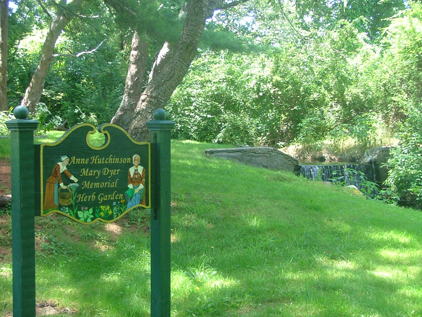
Anne Hutchinson/Mary Dyer Memorial Herb Garden at Founders' Brook Park, Portsmouth, Rhode Island

In southern New York, Hutchinson's most prominent namesakes are the Hutchinson River, one of the few rivers named after a woman; the Hutchinson River Parkway was in turn named for the river. Elementary schools are named for her, such as in the Westchester County towns of Pelham and Eastchester.

In Portsmouth, Rhode Island, Anne Hutchinson and her friend Mary Dyer, the Quaker martyr, have been remembered at Founders Brook Park with the Anne Hutchinson/Mary Dyer Memorial Herb Garden, a medicinal botanical garden set by a scenic waterfall and historical marker for the early settlement of Portsmouth. The garden was created by artist and herbalist Michael Steven Ford, who is a descendant of both women. The memorial was a grass-roots effort by a local Newport organisation, the Anne Hutchinson Memorial Committee headed by Newport artist Valerie Debrule. The organization is called Friends of Anne Hutchinson; it meets annually at the memorial in Portsmouth on the Sunday nearest to 20 July, the date of Anne's baptism, to celebrate her life and the local colonial history of the women of Aquidneck Island. Hutchinson Hall, an underclassman residence hall at the University of Rhode Island, is named in her honour.

Riffing off of commentary from her contemporary detractors, Anne has been embodied as a stand-up comedy act weaving current events and history into "licentious" walking tours and stage shows done in drag centered in Provincetown, Massachusetts.

=== Pardon ===
In 1987, Massachusetts Governor Michael Dukakis pardoned Anne Hutchinson, revoking the order of banishment by Winthrop 350 years earlier.

== Family ==
=== Immediate family ===
Anne and William Hutchinson had 15 children, all of them born and baptised in Alford except for the last child, who was baptised in Boston, Massachusetts. Of the 14 children born in England, 11 lived to sail to New England.

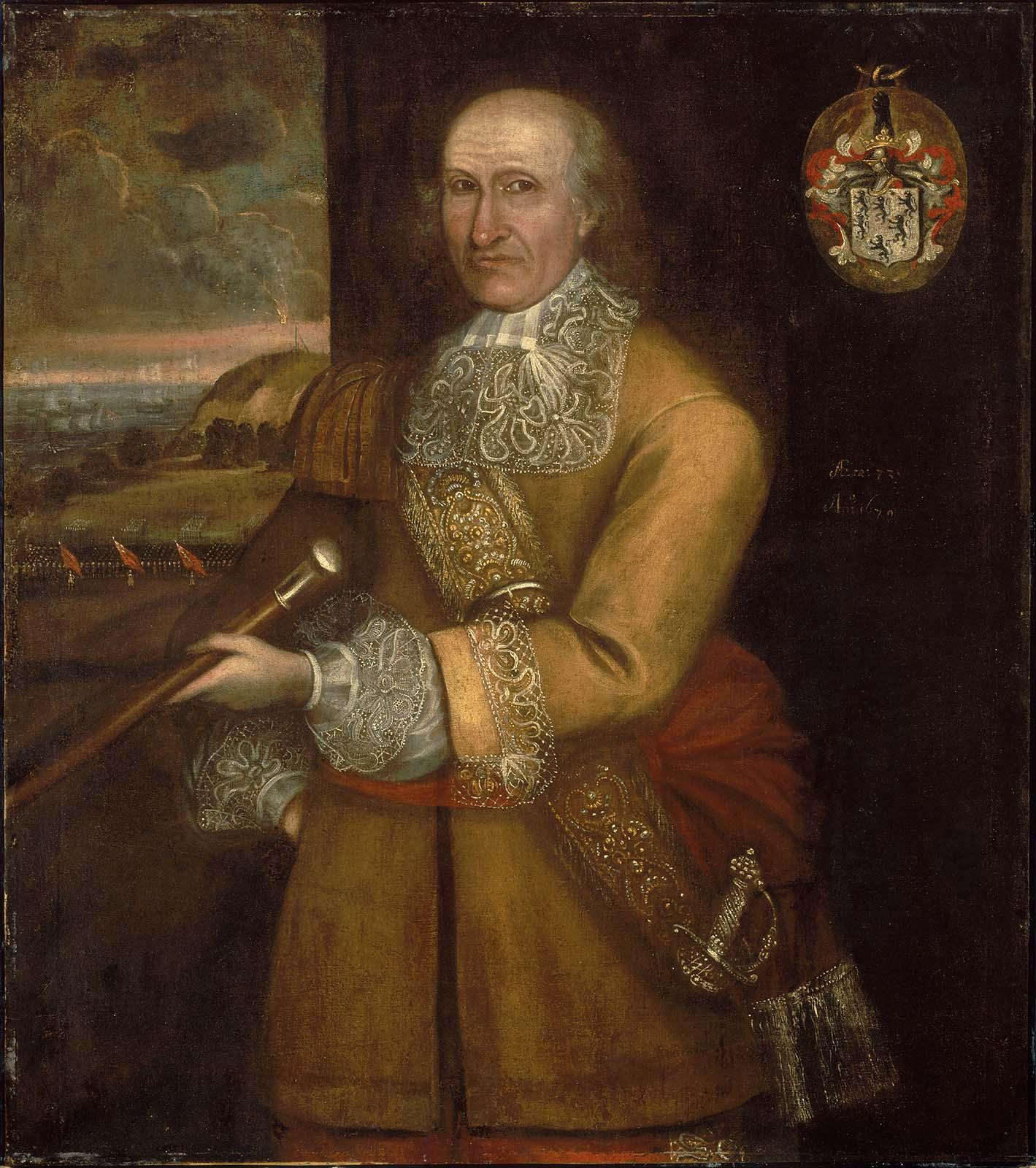
Thomas Savage, who married Hutchinson's daughter Faith

The oldest child Edward was baptised 28 May 1613. He signed the Portsmouth Compact and settled on Aquidneck Island with his parents, but he soon made peace with the Massachusetts authorities and returned to Boston. He was an officer in the colonial militia, and died from wounds received during King Philip's War. Susanna was baptised 4 September 1614 and died in Alford during the plague in 1630. Richard (baptised 8 December 1615) was admitted to the Boston church in 1634, but he returned to England and no further record has been found. Faith (baptised 14 August 1617) married Thomas Savage and lived in Boston, dying about 1651. Bridget (baptised 15 January 1618/9) married John Sanford and lived in Portsmouth, Rhode Island, where her husband was briefly governor of the island; after his death she became the third wife of William Phillips and had three sons, John Samuel and William. She died by 1698.

Francis (baptised 24 December 1620) was the oldest of the children to perish in the massacre in New Netherland. Elizabeth (baptised 17 February 1621/2) died during the plague in Alford and was buried there on 4 October 1630. William (baptised 22 June 1623) died during infancy. Samuel (baptised 17 December 1624) lived in Boston, married, and had a child, but left behind few records. Anne (baptised 5 May 1626) married William Collins, and both of them went to New Netherland and perished in the massacre with her mother. Mary (baptised 22 February 1627/8), Katherine (baptised 7 February 1629/30), William (baptised 28 September 1631), and daughter Zuriel (baptised in Boston 13 March 1635/6) were all children when they went with their mother to New Netherland, and were killed during the Indian massacre in the late summer of 1643. Susanna was the 14th child of the Hutchinsons and the youngest born in England, baptised 15 November 1633. She survived the Indian attack in 1643, was taken captive, and eventually traded to the English, after which she married John Cole and had 11 children with him.

Of Hutchinson's dozen or more siblings who survived childhood, only one other came to New England; her youngest sister, Katherine, the wife of Richard Scott, came to Boston and then Providence. With her husband, Katherine was a Puritan, Baptist, and then Quaker, and was whipped in Boston for supporting her future son-in-law Christopher Holder who had his right ear cut off for his Quaker evangelism.

=== Descendants ===
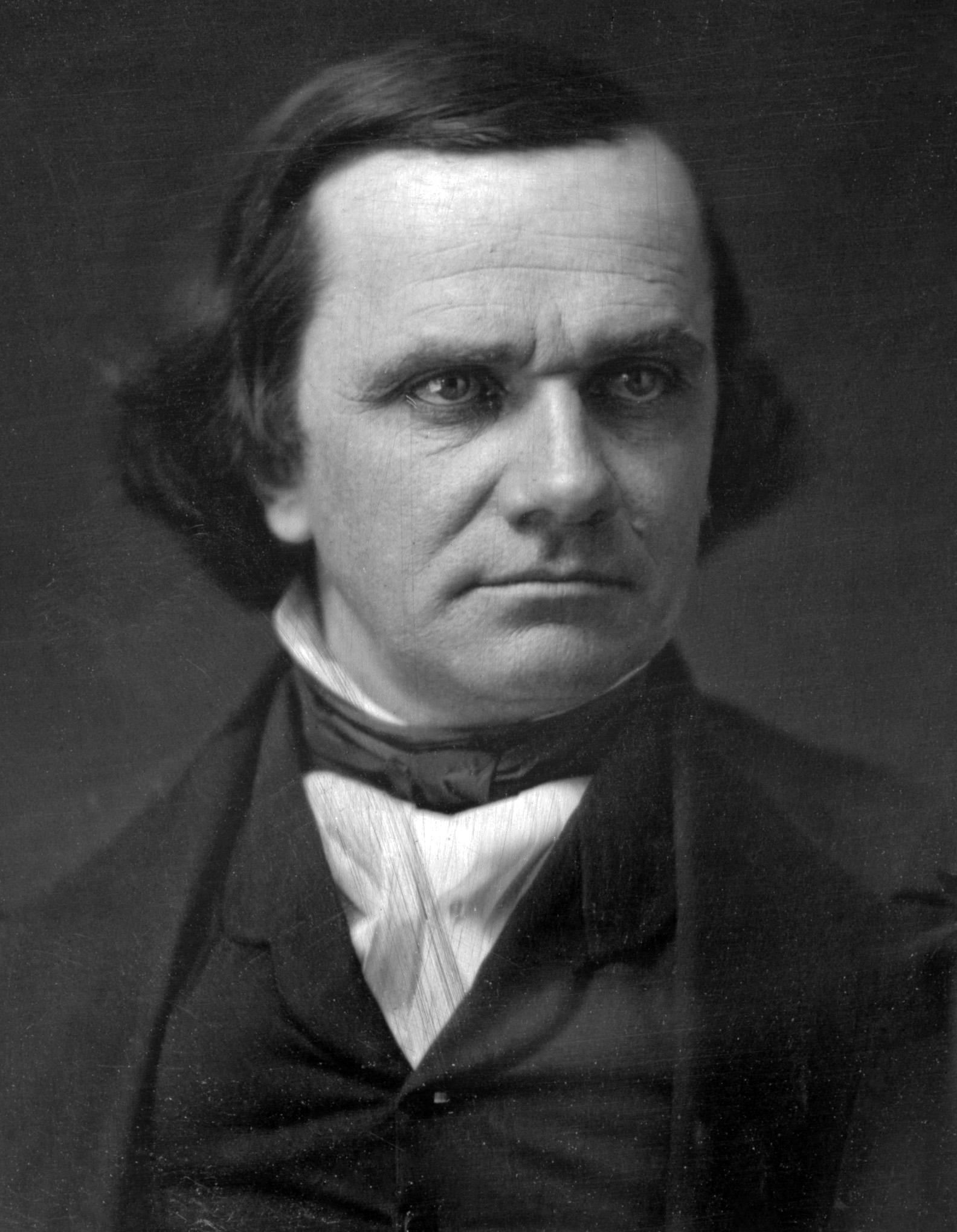
Stephen A. Douglas was descended from Hutchinson.

A number of Anne Hutchinson's descendants have reached great prominence. Among them are Marilyn Monroe and United States Presidents Franklin D. Roosevelt, George H. W. Bush, and George W. Bush, as are presidential aspirants Stephen A. Douglas, George W. Romney, and Mitt Romney. Her grandson Peleg Sanford was a governor of the Colony of Rhode Island and Providence Plantations. Other descendants include Chief Justice of the United States Supreme Court Melville Weston Fuller and Associate Justice Oliver Wendell Holmes Jr.; Lord Chancellor of England John Singleton Copley Jr., who was the first Lord Lyndhurst; President of Harvard University Charles William Eliot; actor Ted Danson; Musician Kaitlyn ni Donovan; and opera singer and socialite Madam Lillie Fay Moulton De Hegermann-Lindencrone. One descendant bearing the Hutchinson name was her great-great-grandson Thomas Hutchinson, who was a loyalist Governor of the Province of Massachusetts Bay at the time of the Boston Tea Party, an event leading to the American Revolutionary War.

=== Ancestry ===
In 1914, John Champlin published the bulk of the currently known ancestry of Anne Hutchinson. Gary Boyd Roberts and others have published her line of descent on her mother's side. Most of the material in the following ancestor chart is from Champlin, except for the Williamson line which was published in The American Genealogist by F. N. Craig in 1992.

Ancestors of Anne Hutchinson

8. Robert Marbury (c. 1490 – 1545)
4. William Marbury (c. 1524 – 1581)
9. Katharine Williamson (c. 1508 – 1525)
2. Francis Marbury (1555 – 1611)
10. John Lenton
5. Agnes Lenton
1. Anne Marbury (1591 – 1643)
12. David Dryden (c. 1500 – after 1540)
6. John Dryden (1525–1584)
13. Isabel Nicholson
3. Bridget Dryden (c. 1563 – 1645)
14. Sir John Cope (c. 1504 – 1559)
7. Elizabeth Cope (1529–1584)
15. Bridget Raleigh

== See also ==
- Christian egalitarianism
- Christian views about women
- List of colonial governors of Rhode Island
- History of medicine in the United States
