= The Play of Wyt and Science =

English morality play written by John Redford

The Play of Wyt and Science is a mid-sixteenth-century English morality play written by John Redford. It is notable as one of the earliest plays to develop a moral thesis as part of a nominally unrelated plot. Redford was best known as a composer of keyboard music, and the play was written to be performed by the children's choir of St. Paul's Cathedral. The play concerns itself with education rather than salvation, stemming from Redford's role as a teacher rather than as a preacher. The character Wit initially sets off with naive enthusiasm to learn by his own initiative, but eventually gains appreciation for the guidance of instruction in a narrative that contains elements of chivalric romance. Elements of the play may also imply a reference to Henry VIII's marriage to his fourth wife, Anne of Cleves.

The play is known from a manuscript in the British Library (Add MS 15233), which includes most of the play bound with pages of unrelated organ music. The manuscript omits the beginning few pages of the play, the music for the songs, and the lyrics of the final song. By one estimate, nearly half of the manuscript's pages may be missing. There is no evidence that the play was ever printed, but it inspired two rewrites, one of which was written by Francis Marbury, and the plot was familiar enough that a pastiche of it was included in the play Sir Thomas More.

== Synopsis ==
Wit, having fallen in love with Lady Science, sets off to defeat the monster Tediousness, who is Science's greatest enemy. Wit ignores advice to use the sword of Comfort against Tediousness and is killed, but resurrected by Honest Recreation. Wit is then seduced by Idleness, leading to a comic scene between Idleness and Ignorance. A song performed by Fame, Riches, Favour, and Worship is interrupted by Wit, whom they do not recognize because Idleness and Ignorance have disguised him. This angers Wit until he looks in the mirror of Reason and learns his appearance had been changed, and Reason and Shame whip Wit into shape and reunite him with his colleagues, who use teamwork and the sword of Comfort to defeat Tediousness. Wit and Science then meet and agree to be married.
