= John Redford =

English composer, organist and dramatist

John Redford (c. 1500 - died October or November 1547) was a major English composer, organist, and dramatist of the Tudor period. From about 1525 he was organist at St Paul's Cathedral (succeeding Thomas Hickman). He was choirmaster there from 1531 until his death in 1547. Many of his works are represented in the Mulliner Book.

Redford is notable as one of the earliest composers, rather than improvisers, of organ music, having notated a significant quantity of keyboard music, all of it liturgical in function, based on plainchant melodies; a few vocal works by him also survive.

While he held the post of Almoner and Master of the Choristers, Redford was responsible for the arrangement of the choristers' performances, including writing and directing plays and interludes. That included morality plays, such as The Play of Wyt and Science (written ca 1530-1550), which exists in one manuscript in the British Library (MS 15233). However, the first five pages of the manuscript are missing.

Redford also wrote a number of poems, including the 23 verse Nolo mortem peccatoris, which was set to music by Thomas Morley, who was a later organist at St Paul's. Another poem is The Chorister's Lament, in which choirboys complain of the cruel beatings meted out to them:

We have a cursyd master, I tell you all for trew
so cruell as he is was never Turke or Jue.
he is the most unhappiest man that ever ye knewe,
for to poor syllye boyes he wurkyth much woe.
Do we never so well, he can never be content,
but for our good wylles we ever more be shente [punished],
ofttimes our lytle butokes he dooth all to rent,
that we, poore sylye boyes, abyde much woe.
We have many lasshes to lerne this peelde [wretched] song,
that I wyll not lye to you now & then among;
out of our butokes we may plucke the stumpes thus long
that we, poore sylye boyes, abyde much woe.

Redford's will (dated 7 Oct., proved 29 Nov. 1547) is published in the Records of Early English Drama. It states that he lived with his sister Margaret Coxe, most likely in the Almoner's House located on the south side of St. Paul's cathedral.
