= John Denison Champlin Jr. =

American writer and editor (1834–1915)

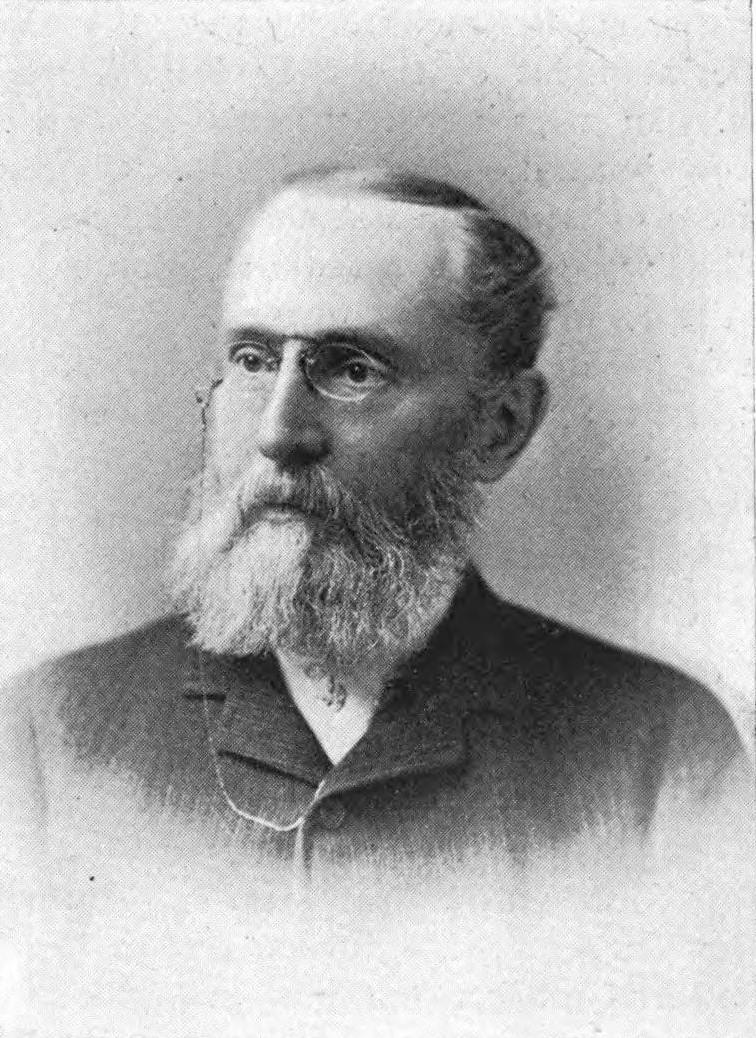
- Born: January 29, 1834; Stonington
- Died: January 8, 1915; New York
- Education: Yale University
- Occupation: Writer

Signature
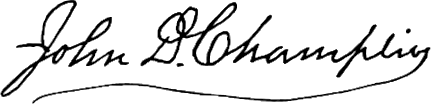

John Denison Champlin Jr. (January 29, 1834 – January 8, 1915) was a nonfiction writer and editor from the United States. As an editor, he worked in journalism and graphic arts.

== Biography ==
He was born in Stonington, Connecticut, the son of a father of the same name and mother Sylvia (Bostwick) Champlin. His father had worked on the construction of railroads in the western United States during their early history. Champlin was educated at the Hopkins grammar school of New Haven, and at Yale University, where he graduated in 1856. In the following year, he began the study of law in the office of Gideon H. Hollister (also a Yale graduate) in Litchfield, Connecticut, and was admitted to the bar in Litchfield in April 1859. After practicing law for a short time in Milwaukee, Champlin joined Gideon Hollister in New York City, and became a member of his firm, Hollister, Cross & Champlin.

In the autumn of 1860, what seemed an advantageous business offer took him to New Orleans, where during the following spring he witnessed the opening scenes of secession in that city. Satisfied that New Orleans was no place for the practice of his profession, he returned north in the autumn of 1861, and after some desultory literary work became, in 1864, associate editor of the Bridgeport, Connecticut, Standard, in charge of the literary department. In 1865 he established a weekly newspaper in Litchfield supporting the Democratic Party, entitled The Sentinel, which he edited until 1869.

In 1869, Champlin sold The Sentinel and returned to New York City to explore other literary pursuits. He wrote for several periodicals until 1873, when he edited a work entitled Fox's Mission to Russia (New York, 1873), from the papers of Joseph F. Loubat. Loubat had been secretary to Gustavus V. Fox on his mission to present the congratulations of the United States Congress to the Emperor Alexander II of Russia on his escape from assassination. In the same year Champlin became a reviser, and in 1875 associate editor of the American Cyclopædia, having special charge of the maps and engravings until the revision was completed.

In 1873 he married Franka Eliza Colvocoresses in Litchfield. Franka Eliza was daughter of Captain George Colvocoresses. They had one son Author John Denison Champlin Jr. II

In 1884 he visited Europe, and accompanied Andrew Carnegie in a trip by coach through southern England. He later became editor of Scribner's art cyclopædias.

Champlin died at his home in New York City January 8, 1915, and his remains were interred in Litchfield.

== Works ==
- Young Folks' Cyclopædia of Common Things (New York, 1879)
- Young Folks' Catechism of Common Things (1880)
- Young Folks' Cyclopædia of Persons and Places (1880)
- Young Folks' Astronomy (1881)
- Young Folks' History of the War for the Union (1881)
- Chronicle of the Coach, describes his travels with Carnegie (New York, 1886)
- Cyclopædia of Painters and Paintings, with Charles Callahan Perkins (1886–1887) v. 3 at Internet Archive v. 4 at Google Books
- Cyclopædia of Music and Musicians (editor, with William F. Apthorp, 1888–90)
- Young Folks' Cyclopædia of Games and Sports, with Arthur E. Bostwick (1890)
- The Standard Dictionary (editor, 1892–94)
- Young Folks' Cyclopædia of Literature and Art (1901)
- Young Folks' Cyclopædia of Natural History (1905)
- Orations, Addresses, and Speeches of Chauncey M. Depew (1910)
- The Tragedy of Anne Hutchinson (1911)

In 1893, he was selected, along with Rossiter Johnson and George Cary Eggleston, to edit Liber Scriptorum, a volume with contributions from over 100 members of the Authors Club.

== Notes ==
Attribution
