= William Dummer =

Politician in colonial Massachusetts (1677-1761)

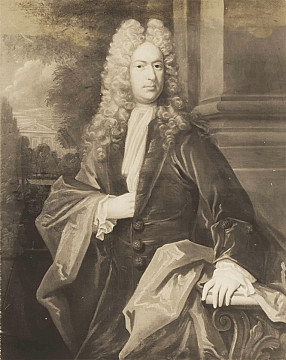
- Portrait of Dummer

Lieutenant governor of Massachusetts
- In office October 15, 1716 – June 11, 1730
- Preceded by: William Tailer
- Succeeded by: William Tailer

Governor of Massachusetts
- In office January 2, 1723 – July 19, 1728
- Preceded by: Samuel Shute
- Succeeded by: William Burnet
- In office September 10, 1729 – June 11, 1730
- Preceded by: William Burnet
- Succeeded by: William Tailer (acting)

Personal details
- Born: c. 1677 Boston, Massachusetts
- Died: October 10, 1761 (aged 84) Boston, Massachusetts
- Spouse: Katherine Dudley
- Profession: Politician, colonial administrator

William Dummer (bapt. October 10, 1677 – October 10, 1761) was a politician and colonial administrator who spent the majority of his life in the Province of Massachusetts Bay. Dummer served as the colony's lieutenant governor from 1716 to 1730, including an extended period from 1723 to 1728 when he acted as governor. He is remembered for his role in leading the colony during Dummer's War, which was fought between the British New England Colonies and a loose coalition of Indian tribes in modern-day New Hampshire, Maine, New Brunswick, and Nova Scotia.

Dummer was born into a wealthy Massachusetts merchant family, traveling to England as a young man to participate in the business. Upon his return to Massachusetts in 1712 he entered provincial politics, gaining a royal commission as lieutenant governor through the efforts of his brother Jeremiah. Dummer served during the turbulent tenure of Governor Samuel Shute, in which Shute quarreled with the assembly over many matters. Shute left the province quite abruptly at the end of 1722, while it was in the middle of a war with the Indians of northern New England.

The war was brought to a successful conclusion by Dummer. He negotiated a treaty with the Abenaki people which formed the basis for a succession of later treaties. In 1728, Shute was replaced by William Burnet, whose 1 1/2 years in office were consumed by a vitriolic fight over his salary. Burnet died in office, and was eventually replaced in 1730 by Jonathan Belcher, who selected William Tailer to be his lieutenant.

Dummer then retired, dividing time between his farm in Byfield and his home in Boston. A proponent of education, he bequeathed funds for the establishment of a preparatory school in Massachusetts, and donated his Byfield estate for its use. For many years it was known as either the Dummer Academy or the Governor Dummer Academy, but is now called The Governor's Academy.

== Early life ==
William Dummer was born in Boston, the capital of the Province of Massachusetts Bay, to Jeremiah Dummer, the first American born silversmith, and Anna (Atwater) Dummer. His grandfather was Richard Dummer, an early Massachusetts settler and one of the colony's wealthiest men, and he was also related to the magistrate Samuel Sewall. Dummer was the oldest of nine children, only four of whom survived to adulthood. He was baptized at Boston's Old South Church on September 29, 1677 (O.S.) [= October 10, 1677 (N.S.)].

Little is known of Dummer's early years. Given the family's wealth, he probably attended the Boston Latin School, but he did not attend Harvard. His younger brother Jeremiah did go to Harvard, after which he went to Europe, studying at Leiden and Utrecht.

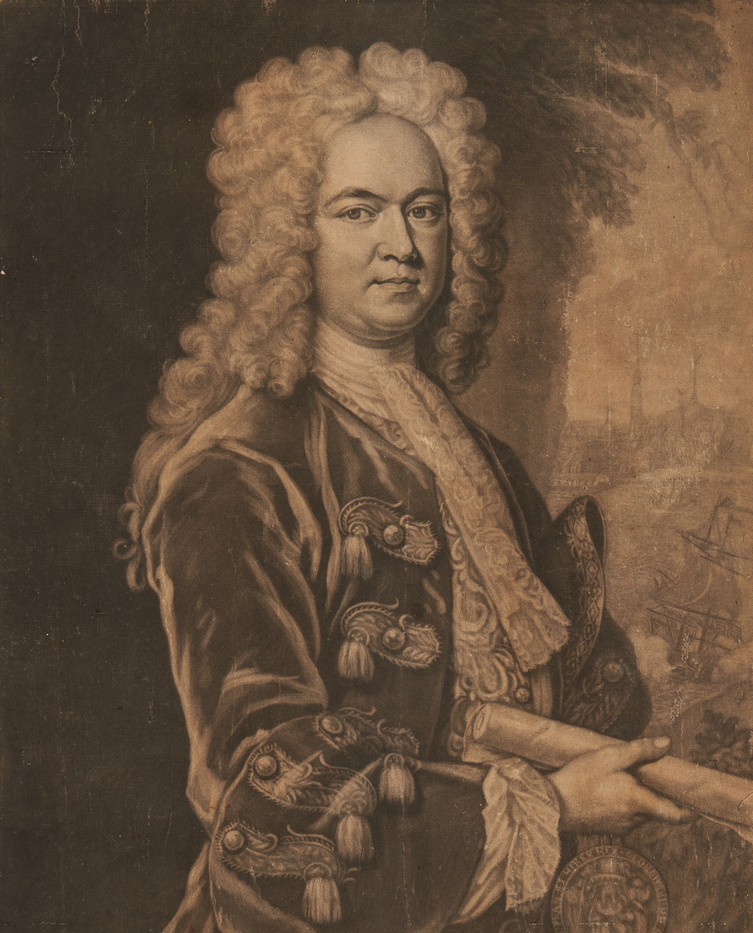
Jonathan Belcher

In 1702 Dummer was elected to the membership of Boston's Ancient and Honorable Artillery Company. He went to England, most likely in the early 1700s, where he joined his extended family's merchant business. He returned to Massachusetts in 1712. While in England he is reported to have married a cousin in the Dummer family, whose death may have prompted his return to Massachusetts. This marriage produced no children. He then married Katherine Dudley, daughter of Massachusetts Governor Joseph Dudley, on April 26, 1714. In a gift that may have been made in anticipation of his wedding, his father in November 1712 gave him a substantial tract of land in the Byfield section of Newbury. The property became the couple's country home. Dummer divided his time between the Newbury property and the family home in Boston.

Upon the death of Queen Anne in 1714, commissions issued during her reign were set to expire. This resulted in a political scramble for appointments to the leadership of Massachusetts between Dudley's supporters and proponents of a land bank proposal designed to deal with inflationary issuance of colonial currency. Dummer's brother Jeremiah was in London representing the Dudley faction. Although he was unable to secure Dudley's reappointment, he and Jonathan Belcher were able to bribe the successor chosen by the land bank faction, Elizeus Burges, to give up his commission. The commission for governor was finally issued in June 1716 to Samuel Shute, a land bank opponent, with William Dummer as lieutenant governor. Shute arrived in the colony the following October, at which time both assumed their offices.

== Lieutenant governor ==
Dummer's role during Governor Shute's turbulent administration is not well documented. Shute had a difficult relationship with the provincial assembly, which refused to pay crown officials a regular salary, and objected to other policies Shute was instructed to implement. In 1720, during these ongoing disputes, the assembly reduced the grant it made to the lieutenant governor from £50 to £35. Dummer returned the funds, observing that his out-of-pocket expenses for his office even exceeded the £50 amount.

The assembly also complicated Shute's negotiations with the restive Abenaki, who occupied lands on the province's eastern borders (now in the state of Maine) and objected to the encroachment of settlers on their lands. Even though there was some desire on the part of the French and the Abenaki for a peaceful resolution to the dispute, the Massachusetts assembly, over Shute's objections, took a hard line, cutting off trade with the Abenaki, and authorizing a militia expedition against Norridgewock, one of the main Abenaki towns. Relations deteriorated into open warfare in 1722, and Shute declared war on the Abenaki that July. Because of the ongoing disputes with the assembly, Shute abruptly left the province for London on January 1, 1723, leaving Dummer to act as governor and commander-in-chief. Prosecution of the conflict was left to Dummer, and it has since become known as Dummer's War (among other names).

=== Western frontier war ===
Dummer's tenure as acting governor has been described by historian John Ragle as "unspectacular but able". In the first half of 1723 Dummer made concerted efforts to recruit the Iroquois (of what is now upstate New York) as allies against the Abenaki, and sought to avoid the participation of bands of western Abenaki (based in what is now Vermont) in the conflict. In both of these he was unsuccessful: the Iroquois, despite significant financial inducements, refused to take up arms against tribes seen to be allied with New France, or to engage in a conflict in which they had no stake. The Massachusetts embassy to Grey Lock, the principal leader of the western Abenakis, failed to find him.

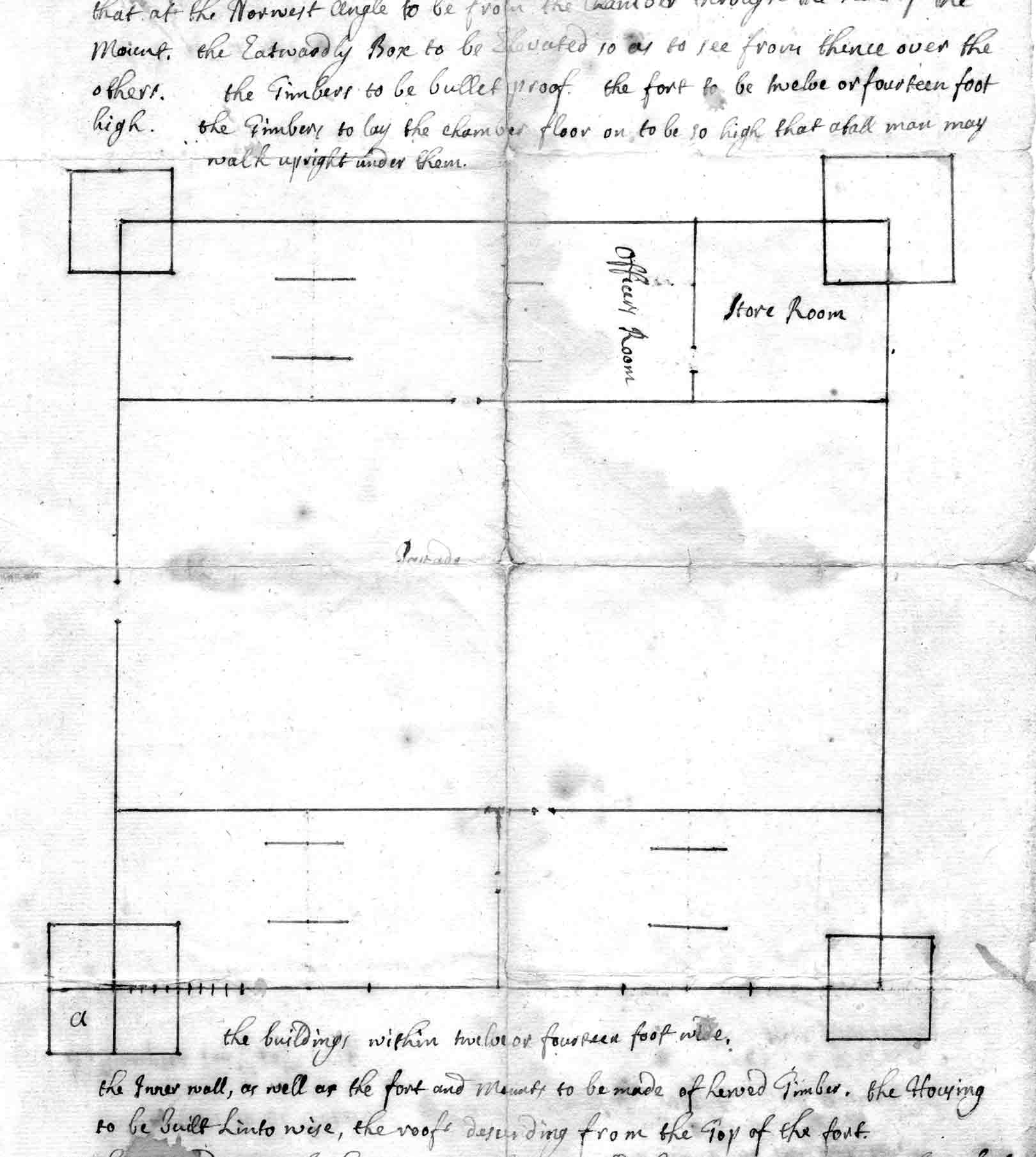
Page from a 1724 letter by Captain Thomas Stoddard describing plan for Fort Dummer

In August 1723 Grey Lock began raiding Massachusetts frontier communities in the Connecticut River valley, taking captives and inflicting casualties at Northfield. Dummer appealed to the leaders of the Connecticut Colony, who stationed a company of militia there in December to little effect. He also authorized construction of a fort north of Northfield, on land he had acquired a few years before in Connecticut's auction of the so-called "Equivalent Lands" Massachusetts gave to Connecticut as compensation for border issues. The stockaded fort was located in what is now Brattleboro, Vermont, and was named Fort Dummer in his honor. It is regarded as the start of permanent European settlement in the modern state of Vermont.

Fort Dummer was ineffective at stopping the Indian raids. When Grey Lock's raids continued unabated in 1724, Dummer renewed his appeals to Connecticut Governor Gurdon Saltonstall, noting that Connecticut was equally vulnerable to raiding should the Massachusetts towns in the Connecticut River be abandoned. Saltonstall sent further reinforcements, but Abenaki raids in the area continued until 1727, when Grey Lock apparently tired of continuing the war without outside support. Embassies sent by Indian commissioners in Albany, New York and by eastern Abenaki leaders failed to make contact with the warrior, and he disappeared from view.

=== Eastern frontier war ===
One of the disputes Shute was engaged in with the assembly at the time of his departure concerned the appointment of militia officers, something that was the governor's prerogative. The assembly had demanded the removal of the militia commander of the eastern district (i.e. Maine), Colonel Shadrach Walton. Dummer continued to argue this issue with the assembly, but eventually relented, replacing Walton with Thomas Westbrook. Westbrook led a second raid against Norridgewock in February 1723, but the village had been abandoned for the winter.

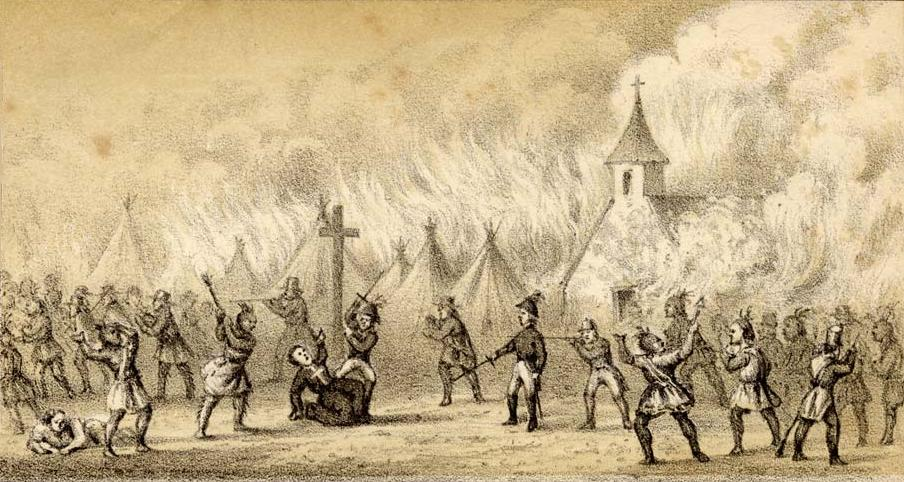
A 19th century depiction of the death of Sebastian Rale in the 1724 Battle of Norridgewock

The war on the eastern frontier consisted of similar raiding activities conducted by eastern Abenaki tribes, and counterraids conducted by the provincial militia of Massachusetts and New Hampshire. After Norridgewock was destroyed in a third raid in August 1724 (an action in which the influential French Jesuit priest Sebastian Rale was killed), the war died down. Dummer adopted an aggressive stance after the raid, accusing the French of instigating the war and demanding their neutrality.

Peace negotiations began in early 1725 in Boston with the Penobscot leaders Wenemouet and Sauguaaram. Dummer led the negotiations, taking a hard line. He refused in principle to halt settlement activities in contested territories, but allowed the Penobscots to retain a Roman Catholic priest. He also pressured Wenemouet to bring Grey Lock and other Abenaki leaders to the peace table. These talks led to a preliminary peace with only the Penobscots at the end of July 1725. Wenemouet then took up the peace cause within the wider Wabanaki Confederacy, sending belts of wampum representing peace to the other tribes. After a translation of the written treaty by a French priest revealed differences between what it stated and what was negotiated, Sauguaaram repudiated the written treaty in January 1726. At a peace conference held in August 1726 the Penobscots attempted to argue against the offending language, but were convinced to sign the treaty anyway. The Penobscots, despite their reservations, promoted this peace within the confederacy, and reported in March 1727 that all of the tribes except Grey Lock's band had agreed to it. A final major peace conference held at Casco Bay in July 1727 formally closed hostilities, and included Dummer, New Hampshire's Acting Governor John Wentworth, Nova Scotia's military commander Paul Mascarene, and many representatives of the Wabanaki Confederacy.

The treaty that Dummer negotiated became a staple of diplomacy between Massachusetts and the eastern tribes despite the discrepancies between written and oral versions. Every major treaty meeting for the next fifty years included a restatement of its terms.

=== Other policies ===
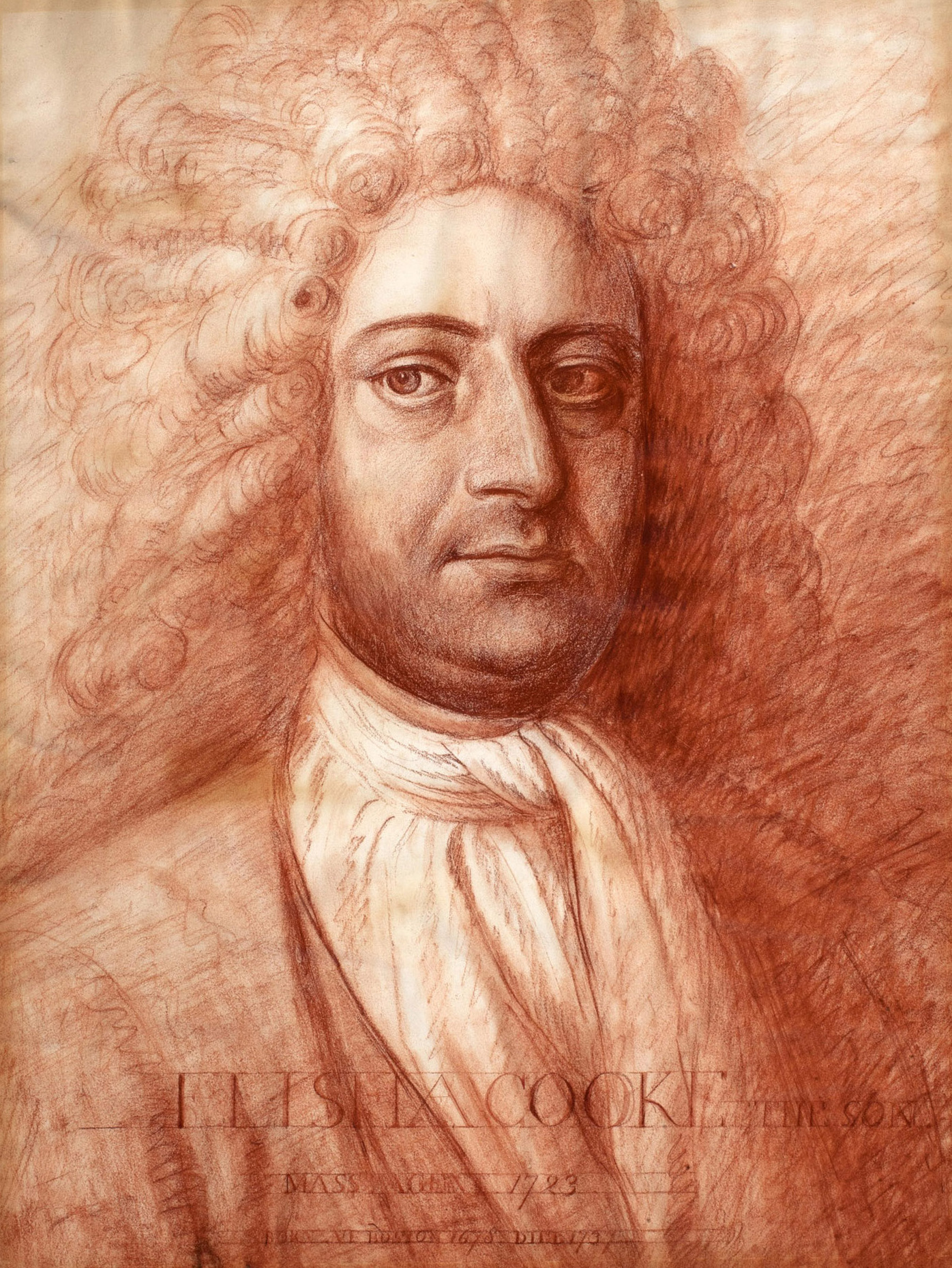
Elisha Cooke Jr.

Dummer sought to be generally conciliatory in his dealings with the provincial legislature, tolerating, for example, the selection of Elisha Cooke (who had led the opposition to Shute) as speaker of the assembly. He finessed the assembly's attempts to interfere with management of the militia by organizing expeditions when the body was not in session, earning the enmity of opponents when it did meet. The assembly refused to appropriate funds to pay soldier salaries, leading to a rise in desertions. They also retaliated by firing his brother Jeremiah (who was widely seen as a supporter of the Shute-Dudley-Dummer faction) as colonial agent.

Shute's complaints to London resulted in the eventual issuance by the Privy Council of an Explanatory Charter for the province, in which the council sided with Shute on all of the major issues. Shute was preparing to return to Massachusetts in 1727 when King George I died. King George II chose to give the Massachusetts governorship to William Burnet instead of renewing Shute's commission, and he renewed Dummer's commission as lieutenant governor.

The matter of colonial currency arose again in 1726. Dummer had been instructed to only allow new issues under exceptional circumstances, and £100,000 was due to be retired. The assembly proposed to circumvent the need for an exception by allocating the issue for the repair of fortifications, something for which Dummer had requested funding. Since the proposed currency issuance greatly exceeded the amount needed for repairs, Dummer vetoed the request and dissolved the assembly. When the assembly met in 1727, Dummer kept the body in session for 165 days, demanding it act on the mandated currency withdrawal. The assembly threatened to withhold his salary, and ultimately retired £40,000 of currency before Dummer relented. The matter had significantly poisoned the atmosphere when Burnet arrived in July 1728 to take office.

== Later years ==
Coat of Arms of William Dummer

Burnet's short administration was primarily consumed by a vitriolic dispute over the assembly's failure to grant him a regular salary. After Burnet died suddenly on September 7, 1729, Dummer resumed acting as governor and commander-in-chief. He remained in office until June 11, 1730, when he was replaced by William Tailer, who had been selected by incoming Governor Jonathan Belcher as his lieutenant.

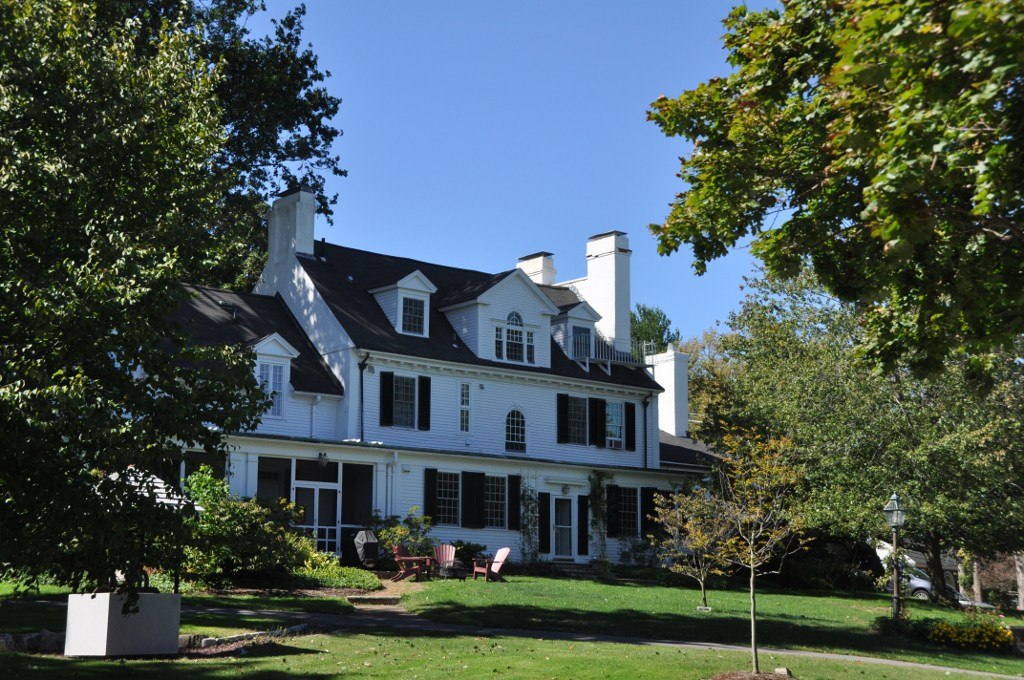
Dummer's house, now on the grounds of The Governor's Academy

After he was replaced as lieutenant governor, Dummer apparently retired into private life as a successful gentleman farmer. He is reported to have served on the provincial council, but there are no further public records of note, and he left no letters or other papers. He died at home on October 10, 1761, and was interred in Boston's Granary Burying Ground six days later.

== Legacy ==
Dummer made several charitable bequests in his will. He gave £200 to Harvard College, as well as a £50 grant for the purchase of books, and partially endowed two professorial chairs. His single largest gift was the grant of his Newbury property for a preparatory school. First called the Dummer Charity School, it opened on February 27, 1763. In its later history it was known as Dummer Academy, and until recently, Governor Dummer Academy. In July 2006 it changed to The Governor's Academy (the benefactor's surname sounded uncomfortably like "dumber," it was decided, and thus elicited predictable taunts during sport meets). Dummer's Georgian mansion remains a central feature of the school campus, now serving as the headmaster's residence. The towns of Dummer, New Hampshire and Dummerston, Vermont were also named in his honor.

== Notes ==
Political offices
Preceded by William Tailer	Lieutenant Governor of the Province of Massachusetts Bay; October 15, 1716 – June 11, 1730	Succeeded by William Tailer
Preceded by Samuel Shute	Acting Governor of the Province of Massachusetts Bay; January 2, 1723 – July 19, 1728	Succeeded by William Burnet
Preceded by William Burnet	Acting Governor of the Province of Massachusetts Bay; September 10, 1729 – June 11, 1730	Succeeded by William Tailer (acting)
