= Governor Vaughan =

Governor Vaughan may refer to:

- John Vaughan (British Army officer, died 1795) (1730s–1795), Governor of Fort William from 1779 to 1780 and Governor of Berwick-upon-Tweed from 1780 to 1795
- George Vaughan (New Hampshire official) (1676–1725), Lieutenant Governor, and asserted Acting Governor of the province of New Hampshire from 1715 to 1717
