= Francis Willoughby (1613–1671) =

Deputy Governor of the Massachusetts Bay Colony
- In office 1665–1671
- Preceded by: Richard Bellingham
- Succeeded by: John Leverett

Personal details
- Born: 1613; Portsmouth, Hampshire, England
- Died: April 10, 1671 (aged 58); Charlestown, Massachusetts Bay Colony
- Profession: merchant

Coat of Arms of Francis Willoughby

Francis Willoughby (1613 – April 10, 1671) was the son of Colonel William Willoughby (1588-1631) of London, England, closely related to the Baron Willoughby of Parham, as it can be concluded from their coats of arms. A merchant and shipwright, he immigrated to Charlestown, Massachusetts on August 22, 1638 and served as selectman (1640-1647), representative in 1649 and 1650, and was elected an assistant (representative in the colonial assembly) in 1650, 1651 and 1654. Willoughby returned to England in 1651 where he was appointed commissioner of the navy at Portsmouth and served in the Third Protectorate Parliament in 1659, representing Portsmouth. He returned to Massachusetts in 1662 and was deputy governor from 1665 until his death in 1671.

Political offices
Preceded by Richard Bellingham	Deputy Governor of the Massachusetts Bay Colony; 1665–1671	Succeeded by John Leverett
