= Samuel Shute =

British army officer and colonial administrator (1662–1742)

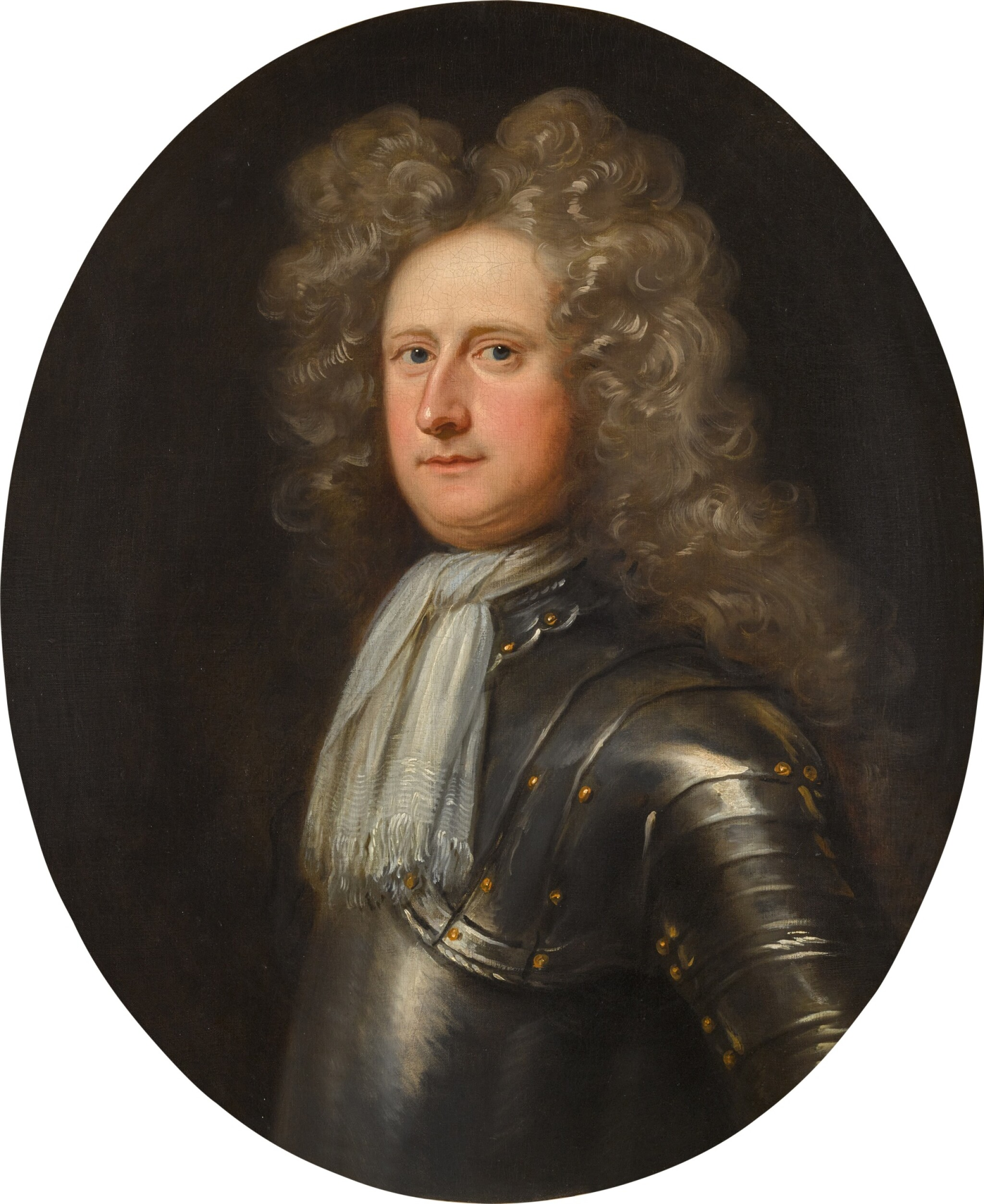
- Portrait by John James Baker, c. 1696–1712

Governor of Massachusetts
- In office 5 October 1716 – 1 January 1723
- Preceded by: William Tailer (Acting)
- Succeeded by: William Dummer (Acting)

Governor of New Hampshire
- In office 5 October 1716 – 1 January 1723
- Preceded by: George Vaughan (Acting)
- Succeeded by: John Wentworth (Acting)

Personal details
- Born: 21 January 1662 London, England
- Died: 15 April 1742 (aged 80) England
- Education: Leiden University

Samuel Shute (12 January 1662 – 15 April 1742) was a British army officer and colonial administrator who served as the governor of Massachusetts and New Hampshire. After serving in the Nine Years' War and the War of the Spanish Succession, he was appointed by King George I as governor of Massachusetts and New Hampshire in 1716. His tenure was marked by virulent disagreements with the Massachusetts assembly on a variety of issues, and by poorly conducted diplomacy with respect to the Native American Wabanaki Confederacy of northern New England that led to Dummer's War (1722–1725).

Although Shute was partly responsible for the breakdown in negotiations with the Wabanakis, he returned to England in early 1723 to procure resolutions to his ongoing disagreements with the Massachusetts assembly, leaving conduct of the war to Lieutenant Governor William Dummer. His protests resulted in the issuance in 1725 of the Explanatory Charter, essentially confirming his position in the disputes with the assembly. He did not return to New England, being replaced as governor in 1728 by William Burnet, and refused to be considered for reappointment after Burnet's sudden death in 1729.

Thomas Hutchinson (Massachusetts royal governor in the early 1770s), in his history of Massachusetts, described Shute's tenure as governor as the most contentious since the Antinomian Controversy of the 1630s.

== Early life ==
Coat of Arms of Samuel Shute

Samuel Shute was born in London on 12 January 1662. He was the eldest of six children of Benjamin Shute, a London merchant. His mother, identified in sources as Elizabeth, Patience, or Mary, was the daughter of Joseph Caryl, a dissenting Presbyterian clergyman. His brother John, afterward Lord Barrington, became an influential member of parliament, political leader of religious Dissenters, and confidant of King George I. Shute was educated by Rev. Charles Morton, who afterward emigrated to New England. Shute then attended the Leiden University in Holland and subsequently entered the English army, serving under William III.

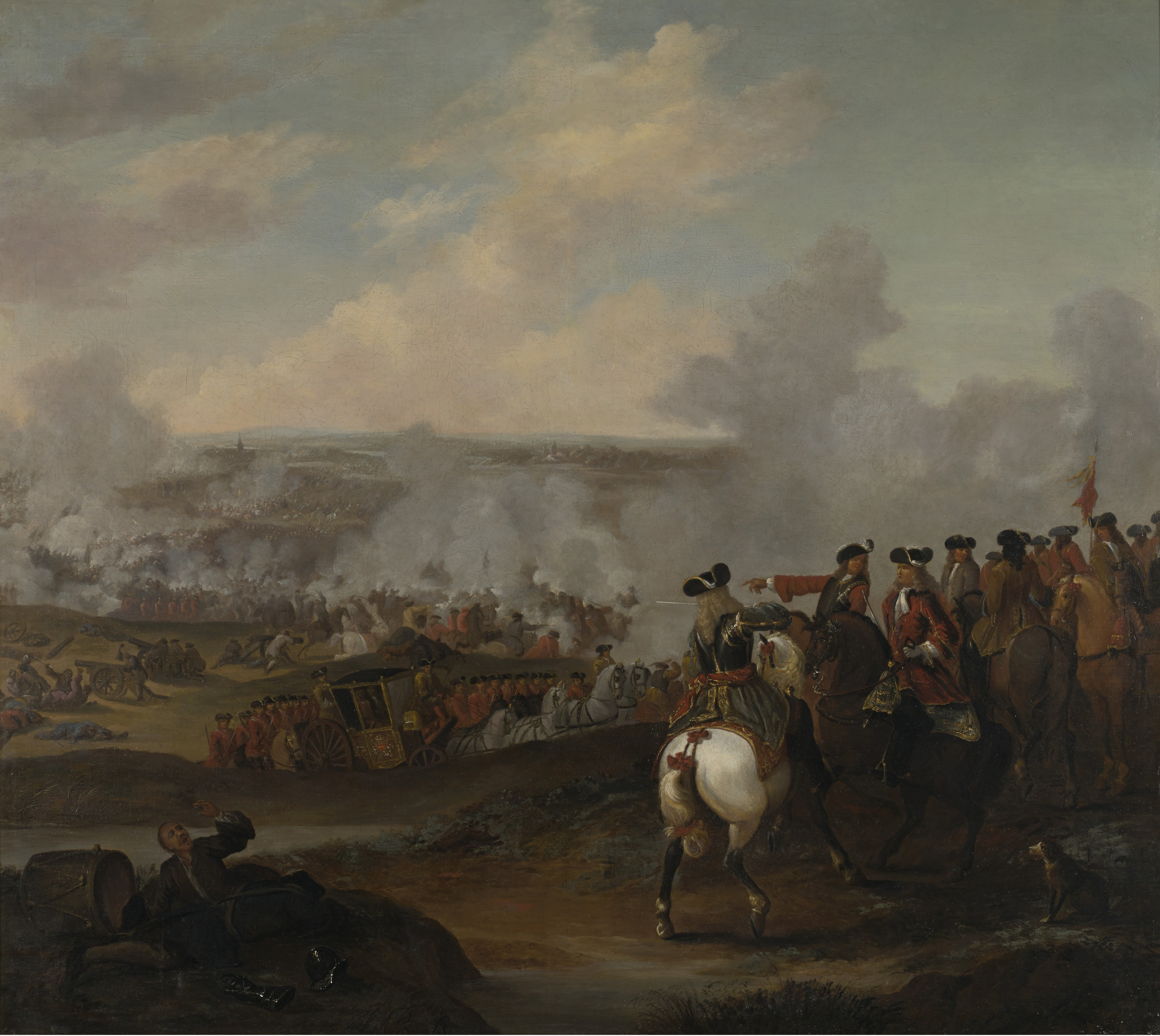
Battle of Blenheim by Joshua Ross, Jr., 1715

In the War of the Spanish Succession Shute served in the campaigns of the Duke of Marlborough in the 3rd Dragoon Guards. He was a captain of that cavalry regiment when he was wounded at the 1704 Battle of Blenheim; by the end of the war he had a full promotion to Lieutenant Colonel and a brevet promotion to colonel. Upon the accession of King George I in 1714, Colonel Elizeus Burges was commissioned as Governor of Massachusetts and New Hampshire. Massachusetts agents Jeremiah Dummer and Jonathan Belcher, representing opponents of a land bank proposal that Burges had promised to support, bribed him £1,000 to resign before he left England. Dummer and Belcher were then instrumental in promoting Shute as an alternative to Burges, believing among other things that he was likely to be well received in New England because he was from a prominent Dissenting family.

== Governor of Massachusetts and New Hampshire ==
Shute arrived in Boston on 4 October 1716, where he began a difficult and contentious tenure in office. He signaled his partisanship by first taking up residence with Paul Dudley, son of the last-appointed governor Joseph Dudley and a land bank opponent, rather than Acting Governor William Tailer.

=== New Hampshire ===
Shute's administration of New Hampshire was not as troublesome as that of Massachusetts, but issues began early. Lieutenant Governor George Vaughan, who had been acting as governor for a year before Shute's arrival, insisted on claiming full authority to act when Shute was not present in that province. Against direct orders from Shute, Vaughan, in Shute's absence, dissolved the assembly and dismissed councillor Samuel Penhallow. In September 1717 Shute, with the concurrence of his council, suspended Vaughan, recalled the assembly, and reinstated Penhallow. Vaughan was afterward formally replaced as lieutenant governor by John Wentworth.

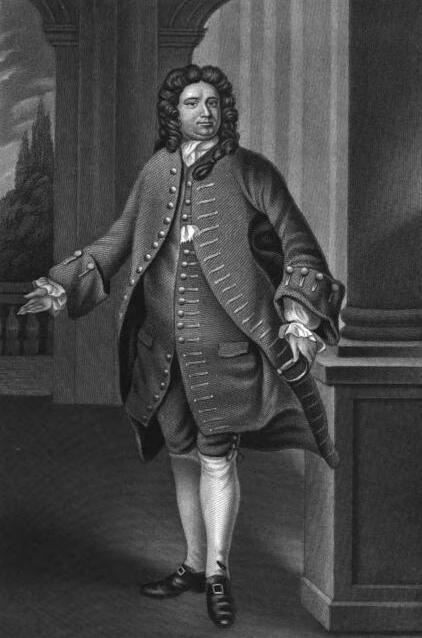
Lieutenant Governor John Wentworth

One positive event connected with the administration of Governor Shute was the resettlement of a large number of Scotch emigrants from the north of Ireland. In early 1718 Reverend William Boyd arrived from Ulster to petition for land on behalf of a number of Presbyterian families seeking to emigrate. Shute favorably received the emissary, and several ships with migrants arrived in August 1718. They eventually settled in New Hampshire, where they founded the town of Londonderry. This was the beginning of a major wave of Scotch-Irish migration to both New Hampshire and Massachusetts.

Shute also made other grants of townships in land that is part of the modern state of New Hampshire. However, much of southwestern New Hampshire was at the time disputed between the two provinces Shute governed, and grants he made in that area went to Massachusetts interests. This upset a number of New Hampshire politicians, notably Lieutenant Governor Wentworth. Wentworth used discontent over these grants, combined with competing ones that he issued himself under New Hampshire authority, to build a power base that would eventually (after his death) successfully lobby for the separation of the governorships.

=== Disputes with Massachusetts assembly ===
Shute engaged in a wide array of disputes with the Massachusetts General Court (the provincial assembly) concerning the royal prerogative and other issues. During his administration the assembly successfully expanded its authority at the expense of the governor's, which permanently affected relations between later governors and the assembly until independence. Currency was a major issue which divided the province politically: a large populist faction supported the inflationary issuance of paper currency, while two economically powerful groups supported competing proposals for dealing with the currency problem. The faction that had secured Burges' appointment supported a private land bank proposal that would issue bills secured by private property, while the Dudleys and their supporters, who backed Shute, favored the idea of paper that was backed by gold.

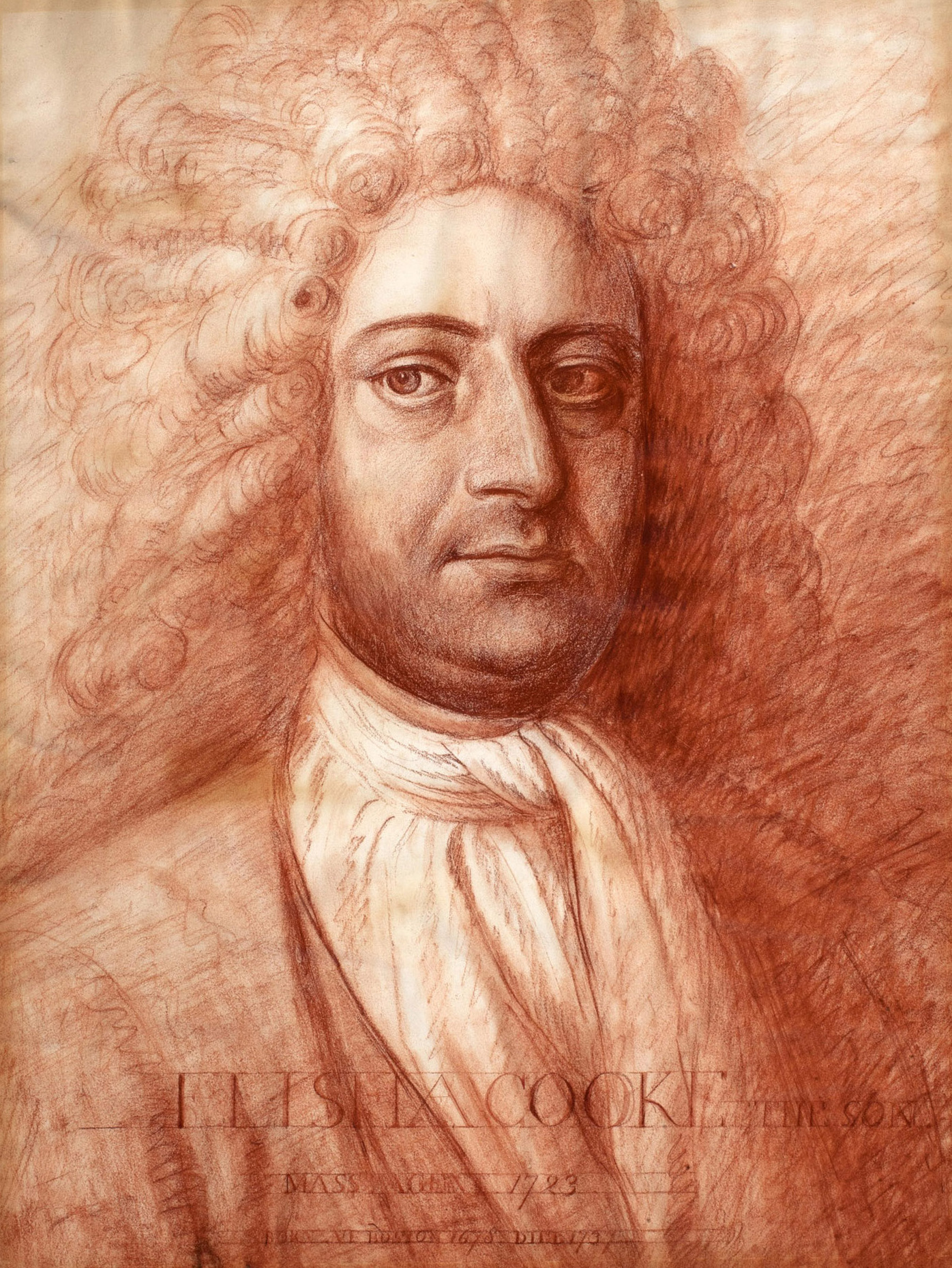
Elisha Cooke Jr.

A major opponent representing the popular factions in the province was Elisha Cooke Jr., a politician and major landowner in Maine, which was then part of Massachusetts. Cooke's opposition was rooted in disagreements on the currency, and the matter of logging in the Maine territory. During the Dudley administration logging interests had widely flouted the 1711 White Pine Act, British Parliamentary legislation that reserved large trees on ungranted public lands for the government's use as ship masts. Shute sought to crack down on this behavior, earning the enmity of Cooke and others. Cooke's early challenges to the law were legal in nature, but rapidly became political. In 1718 Cooke was nominated to serve on the Governor's Council by the assembly, but Shute vetoed the choice. The assembly then appointed Cooke to be its speaker in 1720. This began a constitutional argument about the governor's powers, for Shute refused to accept Cooke's appointment, claiming it was within his authority to veto it. The assembly, for its part, refused to appoint anyone else, and the following year seated a different speaker before Shute was given notice of his election.

Shute's disagreements with the assembly also extended to its ability to adjourn for short periods of time. The assembly could only formally be called into session and adjourned by the governor, and provided one means by which the governor could control the assembly; Shute took issue with a temporary adjournment of six days. This dispute combined with his refusal to approve Cooke's appointment prompted the assembly to become strongly opposed to Shute on virtually all actions. This recalcitrance extended to a denial of any attempts on the part of the governor to fund the improvement of defenses on the province's northern and eastern frontiers, where there were ongoing difficulties with the Wabanaki Confederacy.

One of Shute's more notorious controversies concerned the assembly's refusal to grant him a regular salary. This was a frequent source of dispute, and it spilled over into other matters: Shute's veto of Cooke's appointment in 1719 resulted in a reduction of his salary grant. The salary issue would continue to be a regular source of disagreement between the provincial assembly and the governor until the Belcher administration of the 1730s. Shute attempted to impose press censorship after Cooke partisans published pamphlets harshly criticizing his policies, but the assembly refused to pass the proposed legislation, effectively legitimizing freedom of the press in the province. Boston's conservative religious establishment also expressed reservations over his attendance at Anglican church services, as well as his sometimes ostentatious and loud parties.

=== Indian policy ===
When the War of the Spanish Succession ended in 1713, its North American theater (where it was known as Queen Anne's War) came to an uneasy end. The Treaty of Utrecht that ended the war did not acknowledge any Native American claims, and contained ambiguous language concerning the French cession of Acadia. The contested areas of northern New England included present-day Nova Scotia, New Brunswick, and eastern Maine. Joseph Dudley had in 1713 negotiated an end to hostilities with the tribes in Massachusetts and New Hampshire, but the written form of the Treaty of Portsmouth differed in content from the orally negotiated agreements, and its terms were being violated by British settlements encroaching on Abenaki lands on Maine's coasts and rivers. Furthermore, neighboring Nova Scotia's Mi'kmaq had not signed any treaties. Both France and Britain claimed the claimed suzerainty over the tribes inhabiting the contested area. The tribes, loosely organized into the Wabanaki Confederacy, asserted their own sovereignty and ownership of much of the disputed area.

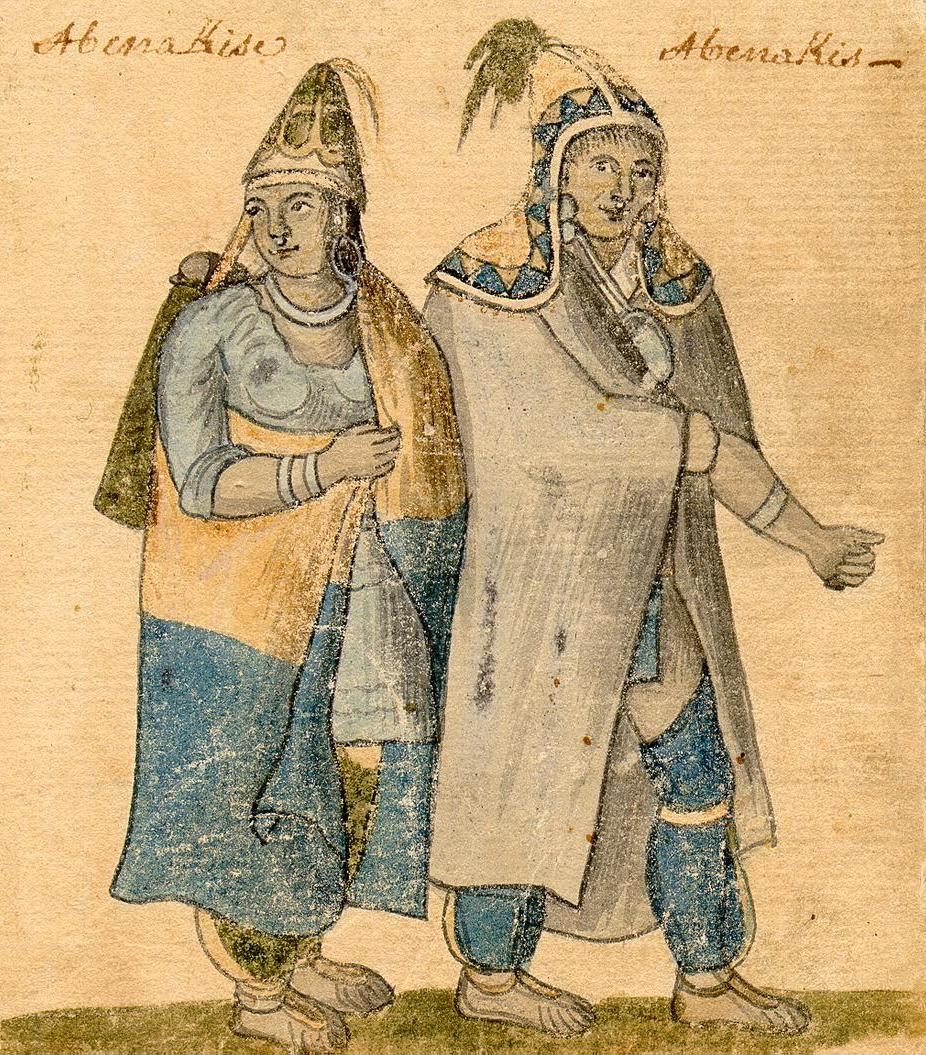
An 18th-century depiction of the Abenaki people

In a meeting at Arrowsic, Maine in 1717 Shute and representatives of some of the Wabanakis attempted to reach some agreement concerning colonial encroachment on Native lands and the establishment of provincially operated trading posts. The Kennebec sachem (chief) Wiwurna objected not only to the establishment of settlements on their lands, but also the construction of forts, and claimed sovereign control of those lands. Shute, who often rudely interrupted Wiwurna, bluntly reasserted British claims to the territory. The Wabanakis were willing to accede to existing illegal settlements if a proper boundary was delineated beyond which settlement would not be allowed; Shute responded "We desire only what is our own, and that we will have." This ambiguous response, and the treaty that was ultimately agreed, did not satisfy the Wabanakis.

Over the next several years settlers continued to encroach on Wabanaki lands east of the Kennebec River, including the construction of block house fortifications on the east side of the Kennebec River. The Wabanakis responded by raiding livestock. Canso, Nova Scotia, a settlement disputed by all three parties but fortified by Nova Scotia and primarily occupied by Massachusetts fishermen, was also a flashpoint for conflict. After receiving complaints of harassment and raids from Canso-based fishermen in 1718, Shute dispatched a Royal Navy frigate to the area, which seized French ships and goods. Tensions there were further raised when Canso was attacked in 1720 by the Mi'kmaq.

At a conference in 1720 the Wabanakis agreed to pay 400 fur pelts as restitution for property damage done in Maine, leaving four hostages as surety until the pelts were delivered. Shute also protested the presence of the French Jesuit priest Sebastian Rale, who lived among the Kennebec in central Maine, demanding that he be removed. In July 1721 the Wabanakis delivered half the furs, demanded the return of their hostages, and refused to hand over Rale (who accompanied them to the meeting site). Massachusetts made no official response, and raids soon resumed.

The Wabanakis then went to extraordinary lengths to produce a written document reasserting their sovereign claims to disputed areas, delineating the areas they claimed, and threatening violence if their territory was violated. Shute dismissed the letter as "insolent and menacing", and sent militia forces to Arrowsic. He also asserted, based on Rale's influence, that the Wabanaki claims were part of a French intrigue to further French claims to the disputed areas. Following up on this idea, he sent a militia expedition to capture Rale in January 1722. The force reached the Kennebec village at Norridgewock where Rale was based, but the priest escaped. The militia recovered a strongbox containing his papers (including communications with French authorities), which Shute used to reinforce the claims of French involvement. Shute reiterated British claims of sovereignty over the disputed areas in letters to the Lords of Trade and to Governor General Philippe de Rigaud Vaudreuil of New France. Vaudreuil in response pointed out that although France claimed sovereignty over the area, the Wabanakis maintained ownership, and suggested that Shute misunderstood the way in which ideas of European and Native American ownership interacted.

The raid on Norridgewock and the fortification of the Maine coast brought a predictable response: the Wabanakis went to war, raiding British settlements on the Maine coast in 1722 and seizing shipping vessels off Nova Scotia. On 25 July 1722, Shute formally declared war on the Wabanakis, marking a formal start to the conflict often referred to as Dummer's War, since Lieutenant Governor William Dummer would end up conducting the Massachusetts involvement in the war.

=== Decision to leave ===
Under the leadership of Cooke and others of the "country party", the assembly investigated the province's expenditures. Finding that some payments of militia had been made fraudulently, the assembly was able to introducing spending bills that very precisely delineated how public funds could be spent; this represented an increase to the assembly's power at the expense of the governor. The assembly further encroached on the governor's authority by establishing a committee to oversee the activities of the militia in December 1722. With the Indian war looming, Shute saw this as a serious threat to his power, and decided that only by returning to London would he be able to correct the situation. Not long after Christmas 1722 Shute sailed for England.

== Later years and legacy ==
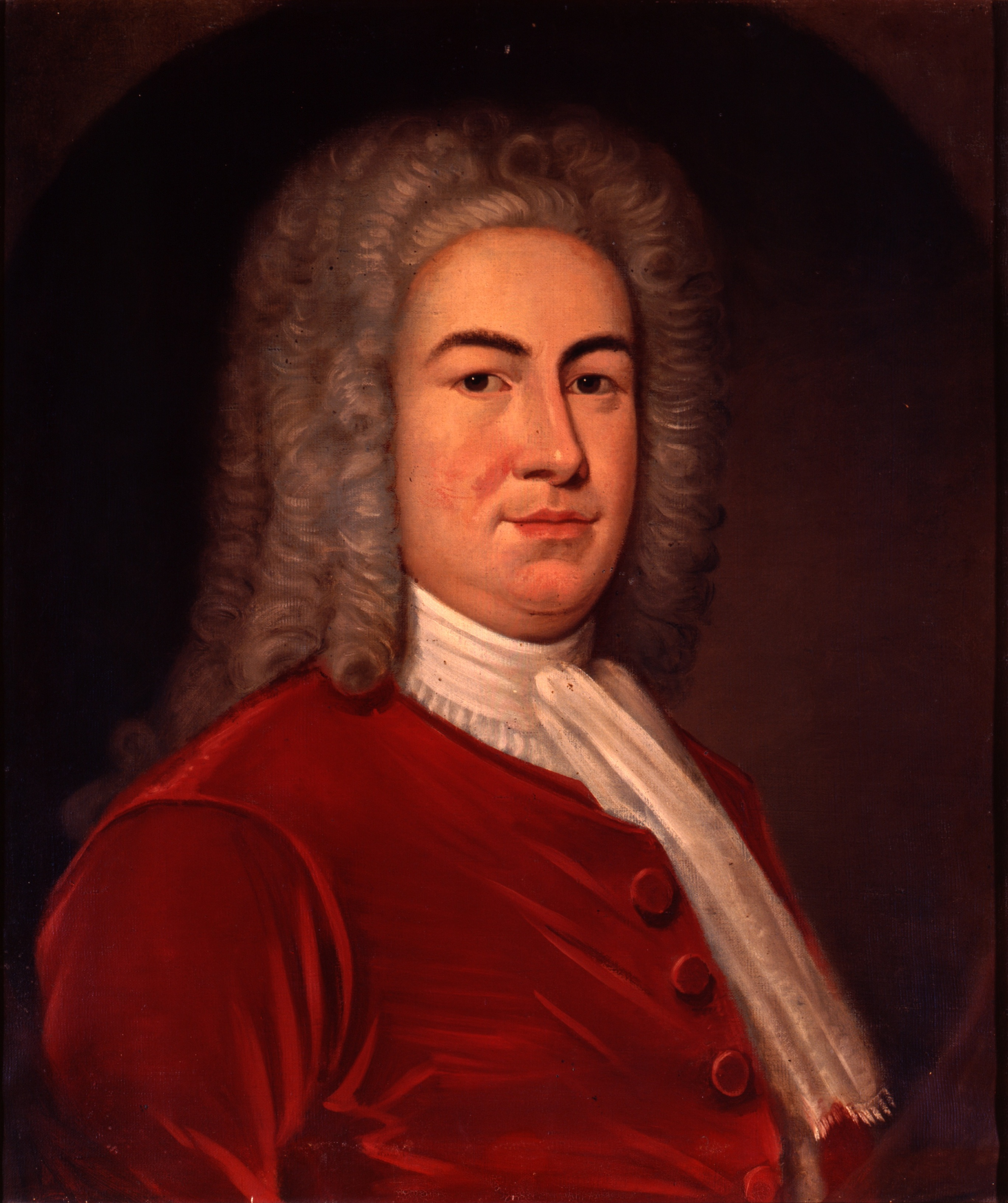
Shute's successor, William Burnet

Upon his arrival in London, Shute presented his many issues to the Privy Council. His opponents were represented by Jeremiah Dummer and Elisha Cooke, the former having long served as colonial agent in London, and the latter being chosen by the assembly to put forward its case. Shute's arguments were accepted by the council, and only the diplomacy of Dummer convinced the council not to revoke the colonial charter. In 1725 the council issued an explanatory colonial charter confirming Shute's position on the adjournment issue and the approval of the house speaker, which the provincial assembly reluctantly accepted the following year.

Shute was preparing to return to Massachusetts in 1727 when King George I died. This brought about a change of administration in London and a reshuffling of colonial governorships. The Massachusetts and New Hampshire governorships were given to William Burnet, then the governor of New York and New Jersey, and Shute was given a pension. Burnet's brief administration was dominated by an extended attempt by the governor to secure an annual salary. The sudden death of Burnet in 1729 again opened the Massachusetts and New Hampshire seats. Shute was apparently considered again for the post, but demurred, implicitly offering his support instead to Jonathan Belcher, who was actively seeking the post. Shute, who never married, died in England on 15 April 1742. Shutesbury, Massachusetts is named in his honor.

== Notes ==
Government offices
Preceded by William Tailer (acting)	Governor of the Province of Massachusetts Bay; 5 October 1716 – 1 January 1723	Succeeded by William Dummer (acting)
Preceded by George Vaughan (acting)	Governor of the Province of New Hampshire; 5 October 1716 – 1 January 1723	Succeeded by John Wentworth (acting)
