= Jeremiah Dummer =

American-born politician

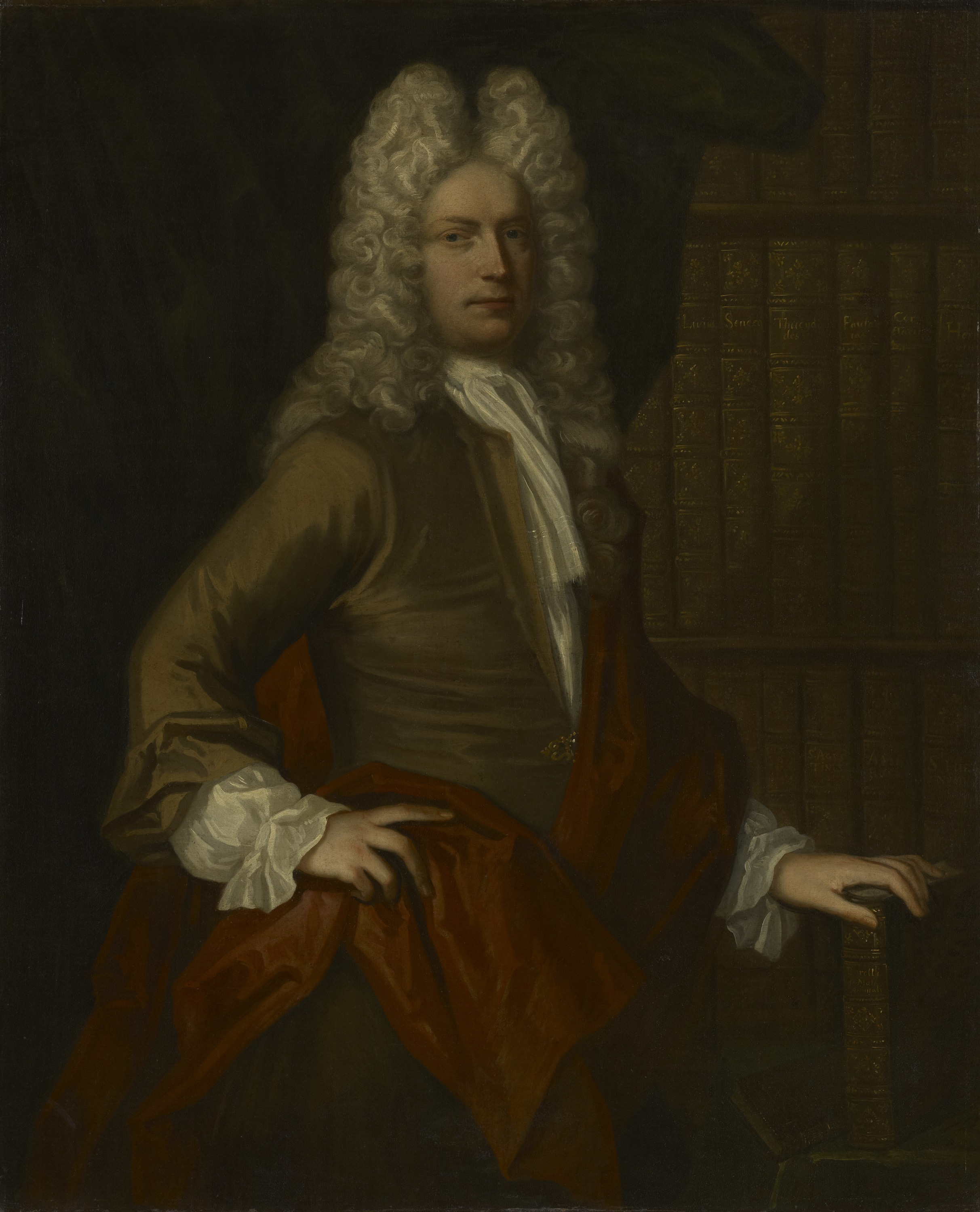
- Portrait of Dummer by Godfrey Kneller
- Born: 1681; Boston, Massachusetts
- Died: May 19, 1739 (aged 57–58); Essex, England
- Education: Harvard College; University of Utrecht
- Occupations: Colonial agent for Connecticut and Massachusetts
- Known for: Yale University benefactor
- Parent(s): Jeremiah Dummer; Anna Dummer

Jeremiah Dummer (1681 – May 19, 1739) was an American-born politician and writer who was an important figure in the New England Colonies during the early 18th century. His most significant contributions to American history were his A Defense of the New England Charters and his role in the formation of Yale College.

== Background and early life ==
Jeremiah Dummer's family history can be traced back to the Dummer village in England in the 12th century. Dummer's grandfather, Richard Dummer, was the first in the family to settle in New England, in Newbury, Massachusetts in 1635. Richard had five children in Newbury by his second wife, Francis Burr Dummer. Richard's son, Jeremiah Dummer Sr., was a prominent colonial craftsman and one of the original silversmiths born in the Americas. In 1672, he married Anna Atwater. Jeremiah Jr., the sixth of their nine children, was born in Boston in 1681. Jeremiah Jr.'s historical significance would eclipse that of his father, who has been said to have been "A man of rare versatility for the times, he learned and successfully pursued his profession of silversmith, producing pieces that today stand out in the work of the period for their dignity, simplicity, and artistic workmanship." Although Dummer's father had received little education while being raised in an agricultural setting in New England, he was able to see to it that his children were well educated.

== Education and early career ==
Jeremiah Dummer graduated from Harvard College in 1699. Deciding to pursue a career in theology, Dummer traveled to Europe and matriculated July 28, 1702 at the University of Leiden. In the same year he also matriculated at the University of Utrecht.

In 1702 Jeremiah Dummer published: Disputatio Theologica de Christi ad inferos descensu. : quam ... sub praesidio ...D. Hermanni Witsii ... placidè ventilandam proponit, Jeremias Dummer, Americano-Anglus, Auctor et Respondens. – Lugduni Batavorum : apud Abraham Elzevier, 1702. – 24, [2] p.; in-4.

Jeremiah Dummer received February 13, 1703 a doctorate from the University of Utrecht. The title description of his dissertation is: Disputatio Philosophica Inauguralis de animorum Mέταγγισμψ, Quam... pro Doctoratus in Philosophia Gradu ad Liberalium Artium Magisterio Jer. Dummer, Anglus Americanus... - Trajecti ad Rhenum : ex officina Guilielmi van de Water, 1703. 23 p.; 4°.

Also in 1703 Jeremiah Dummer published the following publications: Dissertatio Theologico-Philologica, continens integritatis codicic S. adversus nuperas in eum censuras, defensionem. Pars I.: Quam … sub praesido … Jacobi Triglandii, I.F.I.N. …/ publice vetilandam proponit Jer. Dummer. – Lugduni Batavorum : apud Abrahamum Elzevier, 1703. – [20] p.; in-4., and: De Jure Judaecorum Sabbati Brevis Disquisitio. – Lugduni Batavorum, 1703.

Dummer is widely believed to have been the first American-born individual to receive a Ph.D. from a European university, but Roland Cotton (born Hampton, N.H., August 29, 1674) received his Ph.D. at the University of Harderwijk on October 8, 1697.

In 1704, Dummer returned to the colonies and became a preacher in Boston. The theology he acquired in Europe was not particularly well received in Massachusetts. He did not make much of an impression from the pulpit and with the exception of his A Discourse on the Holiness of the Sabbath Day, printed in 1704, his preaching in New England had little impact. Around 1708 he left the profession to pursue a career in politics.

== Politics and A Defense of the New-England Charters ==
Arriving back in England in the fall of 1708, Dummer started an important relationship with Henry St. John (later Lord Bolingbroke), a statesman whose secret negotiations with Dummer landed him in trouble upon the death of Queen Anne in 1714. Henry St. John was disgraced and Dummer's plans for a political career in England seemed to have been dashed.

However, Dummer soon gained an important role in the politics of his native New England. Appointed as agent for the Province of Massachusetts Bay, Dummer held this position from 1710 until 1721 and served a similar role for the colony of Connecticut. Dummer was politically aligned with a faction in Massachusetts politics that opposed the creation of a land bank in order to address the ongoing inflationary issuance of paper currency. Upon the death of Queen Anne, the governorship of Joseph Dudley was set to expire, and land bank proponents successfully convinced the Board of Trade to appoint Colonel Elizeus Burges to the governorship. Dummer and co-agent Jonathan Belcher bribed Burges £1,000 to resign his commission without leaving England, and then proposed Colonel Samuel Shute as Dudley's successor, with Dummer's brother William as his lieutenant governor.

Upon his removal from office, Dummer continued to help his native Massachusetts "without pay and without appointment". Dummer's continuing role in New England politics eventually led to his two important literary works. His first work, "A Letter to a Noble Lord concerning the late Expedition to Canada", stated reasons for the expansion into French Canada, as well as why the 1711 expedition to Quebec failed. His other publication, A Defense of the New-England Charters, was an incredibly important work that argued on behalf of the New England colonies.

A Defense of the New England Charters was published in 1721 and defended the charters of New England, composed of the province of Massachusetts Bay, the colony of Connecticut, Rhode Island, with Providence Plantations, and the Province of New Hampshire. Dummer's work was prompted by a proposed bill for the British House of Commons that would annul the charters of these New England colonies. Dummer sought to illustrate the colonies' loyalty to the crown and their necessity and right to a continuation of the charters with four points that he listed at the beginning of the work:

- "[First] I shall endeavor to show, that the Charter Governments have a good and undoubted Right to their respective Charters"
- "[Secondly] That they have not forfeited them by any Misgovernment or Male-Administration"
- "[Thirdly] That if they had, it would not be the Interest of the Crown to accept the Forfeitures. And,"
- "[Fourthly] I shall make some Observations upon the extraordinary Method of Proceeding against the Charters by a Bill in Parliament"

Dummer then continued in this vein by explaining the hardships the original settlers faced and how they provided England with valuable resources and service. Dummer states, "And then the Conclusion, that I would draw from these Premises is this, That to strip the Country of their Charters after the Service has bin so successfully perform'd, is abhorrent from all Reason, Equity, and Justice." Dummer justifies the colonial charters by explaining the colonies' worth and continuing loyalty to England, ending the work with a justification for his own zealous arguments on the behalf of the colonies. He states, "Being myself a native of one of them, I could not forbear showing my good-will; for how little soever one is able to write, yet when the liberties of one's country are threaten'd, it's still more difficult to be silent." Dummer's work ended up being "one of the chief influences that defeated the bill" and enabled the New England colonies to keep their charters.

== Yale University ==
Although Jeremiah Dummer attended Harvard, his contributions to Yale cause him to be more significantly associated with the latter. During the shaky founding years of the Collegiate College in New Haven, Connecticut, Dummer was an important force in the solidification of the college's future. Serving as the colonial agent for Massachusetts and Connecticut, Dummer sought donations for the school in the form of money and books, eventually securing donations from Elihu Yale, Isaac Newton, and Richard Steele. Dummer's efforts improved the status of the school, providing students with the most current information on a variety of subjects. One of his biggest successes was to persuade Elihu Yale to donate a large sum of money. Dummer wrote Yale "that the business of good men is to spread religion and learning among mankind..." Dummer also secured 700 books for the college's library. Yale eventually agreed to aid the college and the trustees of the school commemorated Yale by renaming the Collegiate College in his honor.

== Death and legacy ==
Jeremiah Dummer died an unmarried man on May 19, 1739, in Essex, England. He left instructions to the executors of his will to "invite to my funeral all such New England Gentlemen as shall be in London at the time of my decease" and to reward each with a ring of the value of 20 shillings. The mode with which Dummer dealt with his death reflects his crucial role in early 18th century colonial history. He was very attached to his native New England and his most significant contribution to history was A Defense of the New-England Charters, which was revived and republished during the American Revolution by John Adams. In both his support for the colonial charters and his role in securing a college in New Haven, his dedication to New England is as important as it is often unrecognized. Although the college was not named for him, Dummer's persuasion of Elihu Yale's support cemented its future. Even if not directly stated, the New England colonies also had Dummer to thank for the continuation of their charters.

Most visible memorials in New England bearing the name Dummer are to his brother William, for whom Dummerston, Vermont and Dummer, New Hampshire are named. (The Indian war sometimes known as Dummer's War is also named for William, who was acting governor for much of the period.) Governor Dummer's Academy, now Governor's Academy, is another visible memorial.

Jeremiah Dummer Jr. was noted by not only being one of the first American colonists to receive a Ph.D. from a European university, but also by remaining in the colony until his death.

In the 1920s during a period of increased interest in early American painting a quantity of worthless eighteenth century paintings were bought in London, then signed with the name of Dummer and passed off on critics and collectors. William Sawitzky of the New York Historical Association found contradictions in the dossiers and exposed the fraud.
