= List of colonial governors of Massachusetts =

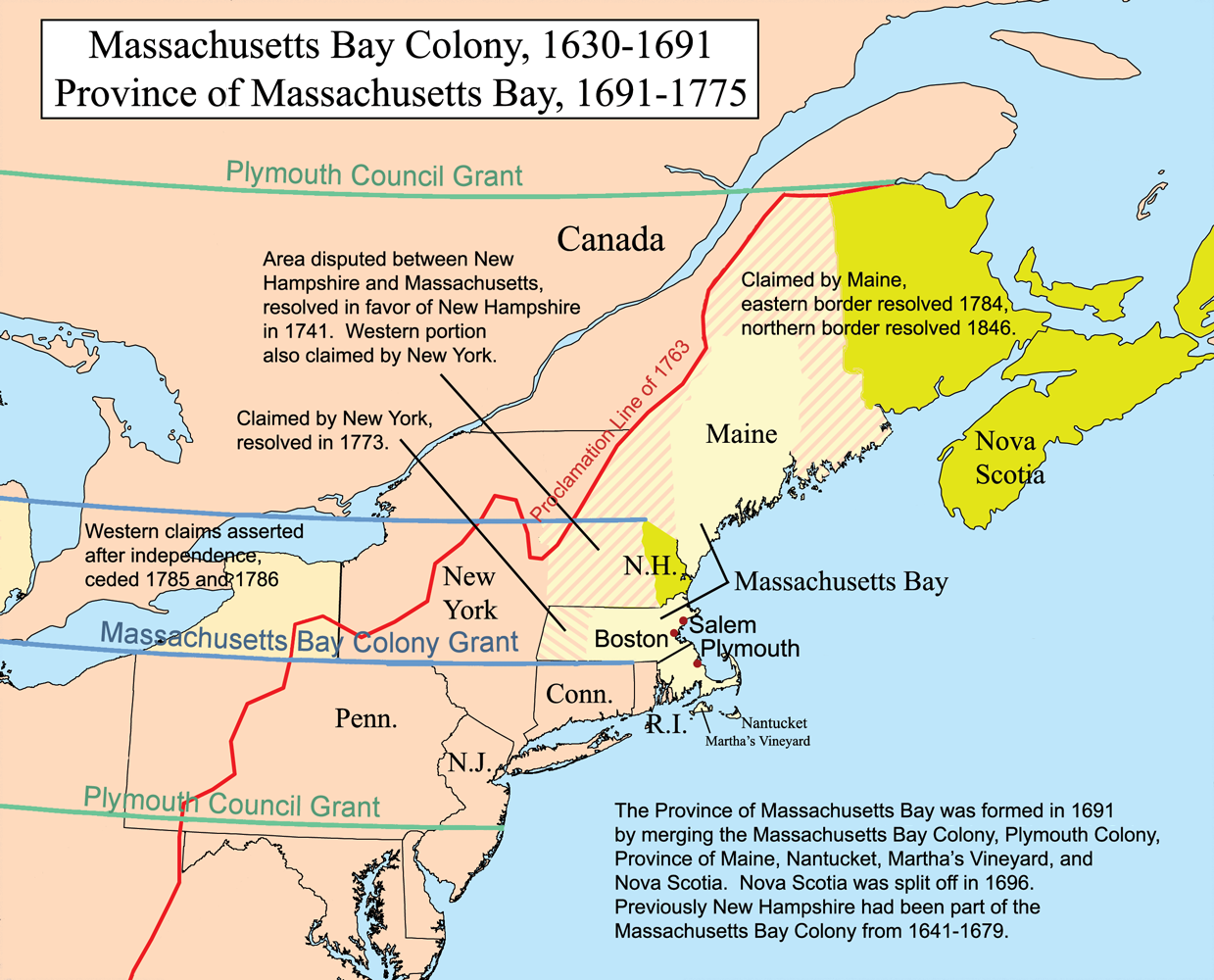
Map depicting lines of charters and grants for Massachusetts-related colonies and provinces

The territory of the Commonwealth of Massachusetts, one of the fifty United States, was settled in the 17th century by several different English colonies. The territories claimed or administered by these colonies encompassed a much larger area than that of the modern state, and at times included areas that are now within the jurisdiction of other New England states or of the Canadian provinces of New Brunswick and Nova Scotia. Some colonial land claims extended all the way to the Pacific Ocean.

The first permanent settlement was the Plymouth Colony (1620), and the second major settlement was the Massachusetts Bay Colony at Salem in 1629. Settlements that failed or were merged into other colonies included the failed Popham Colony (1607) on the coast of Maine, and the Wessagusset Colony (1622–23) in Weymouth, Massachusetts, whose remnants were folded into the Plymouth Colony. The Plymouth and Massachusetts Bay colonies coexisted until 1686, each electing its own governor annually. The governance of both colonies was dominated by a relatively small group of magistrates, some of whom governed for many years. The Dominion of New England was established in 1686 and covered the territory of those colonies, as well as that of New Hampshire, Connecticut, and Rhode Island. In 1688, it was further extended to include New York and East and West Jersey. The Dominion was extremely unpopular in the colonies, and it was disbanded when its royally appointed governor Sir Edmund Andros was arrested and sent back to England in the wake of the 1688 Glorious Revolution.

After Andros' arrest, each of the colonies reverted to its previous form of governance. King William III, however, reorganized the territory of the Plymouth and Massachusetts Bay colonies into the Province of Massachusetts Bay and appointed Sir William Phips as its royal governor in 1692. The Province of Massachusetts Bay was governed by appointed civilian governors until 1774, when Thomas Hutchinson was replaced by Lieutenant General Thomas Gage amid rising tensions between the Thirteen Colonies and the British Parliament. Gage was the province's last royal governor. He was effectively powerless beyond Boston, and was recalled after the June 1775 Battle of Bunker Hill. By then, the province was already being run de facto by the Massachusetts Provincial Congress; following the adoption of a state constitution in 1779, the newly formed Commonwealth of Massachusetts elected John Hancock as its first governor.

== Popham Colony: 1607–1608 ==
The Popham Colony was founded on the coast of Phippsburg, Maine in 1607 as a colonization attempt by the Virginia Company of Plymouth. The colony lasted about one year before being abandoned. One of its principal backers was Sir John Popham; his nephew George Popham was the colony's governor for most of its brief existence. George Popham died in the colony in 1608 and was replaced by Raleigh Gilbert. He and the remaining colonists abandoned it after word arrived that John Popham and Gilbert's older brother Sir John Gilbert had died.

Governor	Took office	Left office
George Popham	1607	February 1608
Raleigh Gilbert	February 1608	September 1608
Source: Grizzard and Smith, p. 189

== Plymouth Colony: 1620–1686, 1689–1692 ==
The Plymouth Colony originated as a land grant issued by the London Virginia Company to a group of English separatist Puritans who had fled to Holland to avoid religious persecution. Their migration to the New World in 1620 aboard the Mayflower was funded by the Merchant Adventurers, who sent additional settlers to engage in profit-making activities in the colony. The settlers had intended to establish a colony near the mouth of the Hudson River, within the bounds of the London Virginia Company's territory, but weather conditions on their arrival led them to establish it instead on the shores of Cape Cod Bay at Plymouth, Massachusetts. The colonists acquired a land grant from the Plymouth Council for New England in 1621, but its early governance took place under the terms of the Mayflower Compact, a document which the colonists drafted and signed aboard the Mayflower before they landed. In 1630, the colony acquired a formal charter with authority to govern from the Plymouth Council, but it was unsuccessful in attempts to acquire a royal charter that would guarantee its territory against other claimants.

The colony held annual elections for its offices. Between 1620 and 1680, it was ruled by a governor who appointed a temporary replacement if he left the colony. In 1681, they began also electing a deputy governor who would serve in the governor's absence. The leadership was dominated by William Bradford, who served more than 30 terms as governor. The colony was incorporated into the Dominion of New England in 1686, but the dominion was dissolved in 1689 and all the New England colonies temporarily reverted to their previous governmental structures. Plymouth finally received a royal charter in 1691, but it was not the one which they had sought for 70 years. Instead of protecting the colony's autonomy, the charter incorporated Plymouth into the Province of Massachusetts Bay, which took effect in 1692 with the arrival of royal governor Sir William Phips.

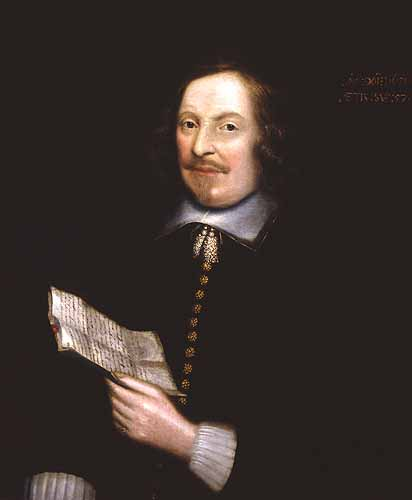
Edward Winslow

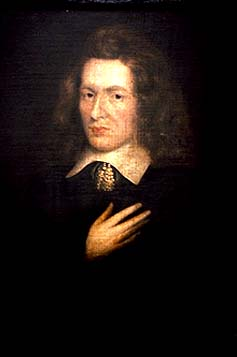
Josiah Winslow

#	Governor	Took office	Left office	Deputy governor
1st	John Carver	November 11, 1620	died April 15, 1621	The colony had no deputy governors until 1681; the governor named a pro tem governor when he was absent.
2nd	William Bradford	May 1621	January 1, 1633	The colony had no deputy governors until 1681; the governor named a pro tem governor when he was absent.
3rd	Edward Winslow	January 1, 1633	March 27, 1634	The colony had no deputy governors until 1681; the governor named a pro tem governor when he was absent.
4th	Thomas Prence	March 27, 1634	March 3, 1635	The colony had no deputy governors until 1681; the governor named a pro tem governor when he was absent.
5th	William Bradford	March 3, 1635	March 1, 1636	The colony had no deputy governors until 1681; the governor named a pro tem governor when he was absent.
6th	Edward Winslow	March 1, 1636	March 7, 1637	The colony had no deputy governors until 1681; the governor named a pro tem governor when he was absent.
7th	William Bradford	March 7, 1637	June 5, 1638	The colony had no deputy governors until 1681; the governor named a pro tem governor when he was absent.
8th	Thomas Prence	June 5, 1638	June 3, 1639	The colony had no deputy governors until 1681; the governor named a pro tem governor when he was absent.
9th	William Bradford	June 3, 1639	June 5, 1644	The colony had no deputy governors until 1681; the governor named a pro tem governor when he was absent.
10th	Edward Winslow	June 5, 1644	June 4, 1645	The colony had no deputy governors until 1681; the governor named a pro tem governor when he was absent.
11th	William Bradford	June 4, 1645	died May 9, 1657	The colony had no deputy governors until 1681; the governor named a pro tem governor when he was absent.
12th	Thomas Prence	June 3, 1657	June 3, 1673	The colony had no deputy governors until 1681; the governor named a pro tem governor when he was absent.
13th	Josiah Winslow	June 3, 1673	December 18, 1680	The colony had no deputy governors until 1681; the governor named a pro tem governor when he was absent.
14th	Thomas Hinckley	December 18, 1680	1686	James Cudworth (1681–82)
14th	Thomas Hinckley	December 18, 1680	1686	William Bradford the Younger (1682–86)
	Dominion of New England	1686	1689	Not applicable
15th	Thomas Hinckley	1689	1692	William Bradford the Younger (1689–92)
	Source unless otherwise cited: Gifford et al., p. 205; Capen, p. 53			

== Wessagusset Colony: 1622–1623 ==
The Wessagusset Colony (sometimes called the Weston Colony or Weymouth Colony) was a short-lived trading colony located in Weymouth, Massachusetts. It was settled in August 1622 by approximately 55 colonists who were ill-prepared for colonial life and lacking adequate provisions. The colony was dissolved in late March 1623, and the surviving colonists either joined the Plymouth Colony or returned to England.

Governor	Took office	Left office
Richard Greene	April 1622	died c. October 1622
John Saunders	c. October 1622	March 1623
Source: Adams and Nash, pp. 11, 14, 27

== Governor-General of New England: 1623–1624 ==
In 1623, Robert Gorges was commissioned as Governor-General of New England by King Charles I to oversee Plymouth, Wessagusset, and future New England colonies. Gorges established a small colony on the site of the recently failed Wessagusset Colony; his effort was abandoned after one year for financial reasons. Some of his settlers remained in the area without formal governance, moving to occupy the Shawmut Peninsula (site of Boston, Massachusetts) among other places.

Governor-General	Took office	Left office
Robert Gorges	September 1623	1624
Source: Adams and Nash, pp. 29–31

== Massachusetts Bay Colony: 1629–1686, 1689–1692 ==
The Massachusetts Bay Company was established in 1628 and was funded in part by investors in the failed Dorchester Company. In that year, the company elected Matthew Cradock as its governor and received a grant from the Plymouth Council for New England for land roughly between the Charles and Merrimack Rivers. The company dispatched John Endecott and a small company of settlers to Massachusetts Bay not long after acquiring the grant. In 1629, the company received a royal charter as a means to guarantee its grant against other claims, and elected Endecott as the first colonial governor, while Cradock continued to govern the company in London. In August 1629, the shareholders reorganized the company so that the charter could be removed to the colony, merging corporate and colonial administration. John Winthrop was elected governor in October, but did not formally take charge of the colony until he arrived in 1630. Colonial officials (governor, deputy governor, and the council of assistants) were elected annually from then on by the freemen of the colony. From 1641, the colony included Old Norfolk County which was split off in 1679 to form the Province of New Hampshire. The governorship was dominated by a small group of early settlers who sought to ensure that the vision of a Puritan settlement was maintained; Richard Bellingham, John Leverett, and Simon Bradstreet all served extended terms, in addition to Winthrop and Endecott, and Thomas Dudley served four 1-year terms. All these men also served in positions of importance when they were not serving as governor.

The colony's governance and religious attitudes came under greater scrutiny following the restoration of Charles II to the throne in 1660, which led to the revocation of its charter in 1684.

King James II then established the Dominion of New England, an appointed regime which was strongly against the will of the American colonists. It took effect in 1686 and lasted until 1689, when the Glorious Revolution toppled James, and colonists in Massachusetts immediately arrested the Dominion's governor Sir Edmund Andros.

The colony reverted to its previous rule on a provisional basis, because it then lacked any sort of legal charter. In 1691, King William III merged the colonies of Plymouth and Massachusetts Bay along with the territory of Maine, the islands south of Cape Cod (including Martha's Vineyard, Nantucket, and the Elizabeth Islands), and Nova Scotia (which included New Brunswick) to form the Province of Massachusetts Bay. This new governmental structure took effect in 1692, with the arrival of the new royal governor Sir William Phips.

Governor	Took office	Left office	Deputy governor
Matthew Cradock	1628	October 20, 1629	Thomas Goffe
John Endecott	April 30, 1629	June 12, 1630	None
John Winthrop	October 20, 1629	May 14, 1634	John Humphrey (1629–30)
John Winthrop	October 20, 1629	May 14, 1634	Thomas Dudley (1630–34)
Thomas Dudley	May 14, 1634	May 6, 1635	Roger Ludlow
John Haynes	May 6, 1635	May 25, 1636	Richard Bellingham
Sir Henry Vane the Younger	May 25, 1636	May 17, 1637	John Winthrop
John Winthrop	May 17, 1637	May 13, 1640	Thomas Dudley
Thomas Dudley	May 13, 1640	June 2, 1641	Richard Bellingham
Richard Bellingham	June 2, 1641	May 18, 1642	John Endecott
John Winthrop	May 18, 1642	May 29, 1644	John Endecott
John Endecott	May 29, 1644	May 14, 1645	John Winthrop
Thomas Dudley	May 14, 1645	May 6, 1646	John Winthrop
John Winthrop	May 6, 1646	May 2, 1649	Thomas Dudley
John Endecott	May 2, 1649	May 22, 1650	Thomas Dudley
Thomas Dudley	May 22, 1650	May 7, 1651	John Endecott
John Endecott	May 7, 1651	May 3, 1654	Thomas Dudley
Richard Bellingham	May 3, 1654	May 23, 1655	John Endecott
John Endecott	May 23, 1655	May 3, 1665	Richard Bellingham
Richard Bellingham	May 3, 1665	December 12, 1672	Francis Willoughby (1665–71)
Richard Bellingham	May 3, 1665	December 12, 1672	John Leverett (1671–72)
John Leverett	December 12, 1672 (acting until May 7, 1673)	May 28, 1679	Samuel Symonds (1673–78)
John Leverett	December 12, 1672 (acting until May 7, 1673)	May 28, 1679	Simon Bradstreet (1678–79)
Simon Bradstreet	May 28, 1679	May 25, 1686	Thomas Danforth
Dominion of New England	May 25, 1686	April 18, 1689	Not applicable
Simon Bradstreet	April 18, 1689	May 14, 1692	Thomas Danforth
Sources unless otherwise cited: Capen, pp. 53–54; Hart, p. 1:607

== Dominion of New England: 1686–1689 ==
The Dominion of New England was established by King James II in order to bring the colonies of New England more firmly under united crown control, and to streamline the costs associated with colonial administration. All of the New England colonies eventually came under its authority, as well as the provinces of New York, East Jersey, and West Jersey. Sir Edmund Andros governed the Dominion for most of its brief existence, but he alienated New Englanders by forcing the Church of England into Puritan Boston and vacating land titles issued under the old charter. After the Glorious Revolution of 1688 deposed James, Massachusetts political operatives arrested Andros and shipped him back to England. All of the affected colonies reverted to their previous forms of rule, although Massachusetts did so without constitutional authority because its charter had been revoked. William III and Mary II eventually issued new charters, but in the process they combined the Massachusetts Bay Colony, Plymouth Colony, and other territories into the province of Massachusetts Bay.

Plans to establish the dominion had started under King Charles II early in the 1680s. He initially selected Colonel Percy Kirke as the dominion's governor in 1684. Kirke's commission was approved by James, but was then withdrawn after Kirke's controversially harsh actions in putting down Monmouth's Rebellion in 1685. Joseph Dudley, son of Thomas Dudley, was given a commission as "President of the Council of New England" with limited powers as an interim measure before Andros' commission could be finalized.

Governor	Took office	Left office	Lieutenant Governor
Joseph Dudley (as President of the Council of New England)	May 25, 1686	December 20, 1686	William Stoughton (as Deputy President)
Sir Edmund Andros	December 20, 1686	April 18, 1689	Francis Nicholson (appointed April 1688)

== Province of Massachusetts Bay: 1692–1775 ==
The royal charter for the province of Massachusetts Bay was issued in 1691. The territory that it encompassed included the Massachusetts Bay Colony, the Plymouth Colony, the territories of Maine and Nova Scotia (which then included New Brunswick), and the proprietary plantation holdings of Nantucket, Martha's Vineyard, and other islands off the southern coast of Cape Cod. The government did not formally begin operating until royally appointed governor Sir William Phips arrived in 1692. From 1699 to 1741, the governor of Massachusetts was also commissioned as the governor of New Hampshire. The province was governed by civilian governors until 1774, when Thomas Hutchinson was replaced by Lieutenant General Thomas Gage amid rising tensions between the Thirteen Colonies and the British Parliament. Gage was the province's last royal governor. He was effectively powerless beyond Boston, and was recalled after the June 1775 Battle of Bunker Hill. By then, the province was already being run de facto by the Massachusetts Provincial Congress, which continued to govern until 1780. The Massachusetts Constitution was adopted in 1779, and the Commonwealth of Massachusetts elected John Hancock as its first governor.

Under the terms of the royal charter, both the governor and lieutenant governor were appointed by the crown. The charter contained a provision that the governor's council would assume the duties of the governor should both governor and lieutenant governor be absent from the colony. This occurred three times:

1. Acting governor William Stoughton died in 1701, and the council governed until the arrival of Joseph Dudley.
2. Queen Anne died in 1714 and the commissions that she had issued expired six months later. Her successor King George I issued an order continuing all commissions, but this order did not reach Massachusetts before the six months expired. The council asserted its authority, claiming that the commissions had expired of Joseph Dudley and William Tailer, and the council ruled from February 4 until March 21, 1715, when the king's order arrived.
3. Acting governor Spencer Phips died in 1757, and the council governed until the arrival of Thomas Pownall.

Governor	Took office	Left office	Lieutenant Governor
Sir William Phips	May 16, 1692	November 17, 1694	William Stoughton (May 16, 1692 – died July 7, 1701)
William Stoughton (acting)	December 4, 1694	May 26, 1699	William Stoughton (May 16, 1692 – died July 7, 1701)
Richard Coote, 1st Earl of Bellomont	May 26, 1699	July 17, 1700	William Stoughton (May 16, 1692 – died July 7, 1701)
William Stoughton (acting)	July 22, 1700	died July 7, 1701	William Stoughton (May 16, 1692 – died July 7, 1701)
Governor's Council (acting)	July 10, 1701	June 11, 1702	Vacant
Joseph Dudley	June 11, 1702	February 4, 1715	Thomas Povey (June 11, 1702 – left colony c. January 28, 1706)
Joseph Dudley	June 11, 1702	February 4, 1715	Vacant
Joseph Dudley	June 11, 1702	February 4, 1715	William Tailer (October 4, 1711 – February 4, 1715)
Governor's Council (acting)	February 4, 1715	March 21, 1715	Vacant
Joseph Dudley	March 21, 1715	November 9, 1715	William Tailer (March 21, 1715 – October 5, 1716)
William Tailer (acting)	November 9, 1715	October 5, 1716	William Tailer (March 21, 1715 – October 5, 1716)
Samuel Shute	October 5, 1716	left colony January 1, 1723	William Dummer (October 5, 1716 – June 11, 1730)
William Dummer (acting)	January 2, 1723	July 19, 1728	William Dummer (October 5, 1716 – June 11, 1730)
William Burnet	July 19, 1728	died September 7, 1729	William Dummer (October 5, 1716 – June 11, 1730)
William Dummer (acting)	September 10, 1729	June 11, 1730	William Dummer (October 5, 1716 – June 11, 1730)
William Tailer (acting)	June 11, 1730	August 10, 1730	William Tailer (June 11, 1730 – died March 1, 1732)
Jonathan Belcher	August 10, 1730	August 14, 1741	William Tailer (June 11, 1730 – died March 1, 1732)
Jonathan Belcher	August 10, 1730	August 14, 1741	Vacant
Jonathan Belcher	August 10, 1730	August 14, 1741	Spencer Phips (August 8, 1732 – died April 4, 1757)
William Shirley	August 14, 1741	September 11, 1749	Spencer Phips (August 8, 1732 – died April 4, 1757)
Spencer Phips (acting)	September 15, 1749	August 7, 1753	Spencer Phips (August 8, 1732 – died April 4, 1757)
William Shirley	August 7, 1753	September 25, 1756	Spencer Phips (August 8, 1732 – died April 4, 1757)
Spencer Phips (acting)	September 25, 1756	died April 4, 1757	Spencer Phips (August 8, 1732 – died April 4, 1757)
Governor's Council (acting)	April 5, 1757	August 3, 1757	Vacant
Thomas Pownall	August 3, 1757	June 3, 1760	Thomas Hutchinson (June 1, 1758 – March 14, 1771)
Thomas Hutchinson (acting)	June 3, 1760	August 2, 1760	Thomas Hutchinson (June 1, 1758 – March 14, 1771)
Sir Francis Bernard, 1st Baronet	August 2, 1760	August 1, 1769	Thomas Hutchinson (June 1, 1758 – March 14, 1771)
Thomas Hutchinson (acting, August 2, 1769 – March 14, 1771)	August 2, 1769	May 17, 1774	Thomas Hutchinson (June 1, 1758 – March 14, 1771)
Thomas Hutchinson (acting, August 2, 1769 – March 14, 1771)	August 2, 1769	May 17, 1774	Andrew Oliver (March 14, 1771 – died March 3, 1774)
Thomas Hutchinson (acting, August 2, 1769 – March 14, 1771)	August 2, 1769	May 17, 1774	Vacant
Thomas Gage	May 17, 1774	October 11, 1775 (Note: This is the de facto end of Gage's tenure, when he departed Boston for the last time.)	Vacant
Thomas Gage	May 17, 1774	October 11, 1775	Thomas Oliver (August 8, 1774 – March 17, 1776) (Note: This is the de facto end of Oliver's tenure, when he departed Boston for the last time.)
Source unless otherwise cited: Massachusetts Royal Commissions, pp. xxxiii–xxxv

== See also ==
- List of colonial governors of New Hampshire
- List of colonial governors of Maine
- List of lieutenant governors of Nova Scotia
- List of governors of Acadia
- List of members of the colonial Massachusetts House of Representatives
