= William Tailer =

Lieutenant Governor of the Province of Massachusetts Bay

Acting Governor of the Province of Massachusetts Bay
- In office November 9, 1715 – October 5, 1716
- Preceded by: Joseph Dudley
- Succeeded by: Samuel Shute
- In office June 11, 1730 – August 10, 1730
- Preceded by: William Dummer (acting)
- Succeeded by: Jonathan Belcher

Personal details
- Born: February 25, 1675/6 Dorchester, Suffolk County, Massachusetts Bay Colony
- Died: March 1, 1732 (aged 56) Dorchester, Suffolk County, Province of Massachusetts Bay

William Tailer (February 25, 1675/6 – March 1, 1731/2) was a military officer and politician in the Province of Massachusetts Bay. Born into the wealthy and influential Stoughton family, he twice married into other politically powerful families. He served as lieutenant governor of the province from 1711 until 1716, and again in the early 1730s. During each of these times he was briefly acting governor. He was a political opponent of Governor Joseph Dudley, and was a supporter of a land bank proposal intended to address the province's currency problems. During his first tenure as acting governor he authorized the erection of Boston Light, the earliest lighthouse in what is now the United States.

He was active in the provincial defense, and commanded a regiment in the 1710 siege of Port Royal, the capital of French Acadia, during Queen Anne's War. He was responsible for overseeing the defenses of Boston in the 1720s, and was sent to negotiate with the Iroquois and Abenaki during Dummer's War. Jonathan Belcher, initially a political opponent, later became an ally, and selected him to serve as his lieutenant governor in 1730. Tailer held the post until his death, and was interred in the tomb of his uncle, William Stoughton.

== Early life and military service ==
William Tailer was born in Dorchester, Massachusetts Bay Colony on February 25, 1675/6 to William Tailer and Rebecca Stoughton Tailer. His mother was the daughter of early Massachusetts settler Israel Stoughton and sister to magistrate William Stoughton. His father was a wealthy landowner and merchant. His father owned commercial real estate in Boston and was a member of the Atherton Company, one of New England's most powerful and well-connected land development partnerships. He was also one of "a selected fraternity" of merchants engaged in the "eastward trade" with neighboring French Acadia, one of whose leading members was Boston merchant John Nelson. Tailer's father committed suicide in 1682, apparently suffering from depression which may have been brought on by financial reverses.

The younger Tailer inherited a substantial estate; it was reported that in 1695 his guardians operated five mills on his behalf. He was also a beneficiary of the large estate of his uncle, who died a childless bachelor. By 1702 Tailer had married Sarah Byfield, daughter to Nathaniel Byfield, another leading colonial magistrate. She died childless in about 1708. Byfield and Tailer's father had been business partners, a relationship that Tailer continued.

He served in the provincial militia during Queen Anne's War. In 1710 he commanded a militia regiment that saw action at the capture of Port Royal, Acadia. Following the victory he went London with Francis Nicholson, the expedition's leader, where he was "bigg with expectation" of advancement. His expectations were rewarded with a commission as lieutenant governor of the Province of Massachusetts Bay, serving under Governor Joseph Dudley. He then returned to Massachusetts, where he was again active in the defense of the colonies, serving at Fort William and Mary in New Hampshire, and reporting on the frontier defenses in what is now southern Maine (but was then part of Massachusetts).

In early 1711/2 he married Abigail Gillam Dudley, widow of Joseph Dudley's grandson Thomas. The couple had six children, who they raised in the old Stoughton homestead in Dorchester. Tailer joined the Ancient and Honorable Artillery Company in 1712 and was elected as its captain the same year.

== Acting governor of Massachusetts ==
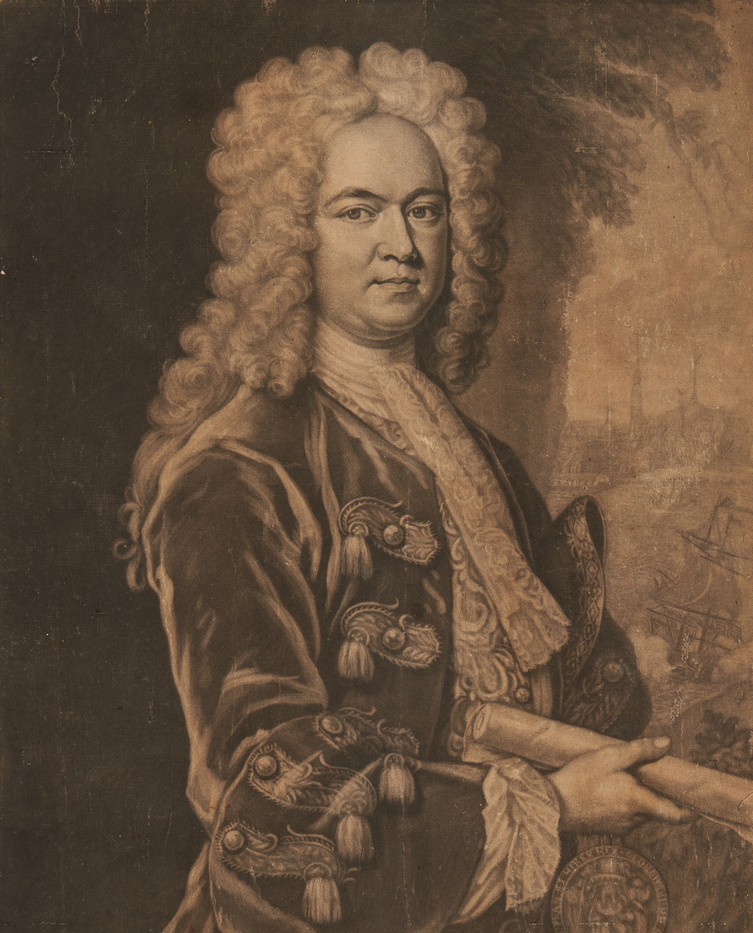
Jonathan Belcher, who was first an opponent then ally of Tailers

Tailer was elected to the Governor's Council from 1712 to 1729, and was on three separate occasions commissioned as lieutenant governor of Massachusetts. Despite his connection by marriage to the Dudleys, he had an awkward political relationship with the governor during the period of his first two commissions. A number of Anglicans in the colony, Tailer among them, were skeptical of Dudley's faith. (Dudley had been raised in the Puritan way, and had formally adopted Anglican practices while in England in the 1690s.) He and Dudley were also on opposite sides of the debate on the province's currency problems. Dudley favored the issuance of public bills of credit as a means to circumvent the inflationary issuance of paper currency that had become a serious problem by the end of Queen Anne's War in 1713, while Tailer, along with his father-in-law Nathaniel Byfield and others, favored the establishment of a private land bank, that would issue bills secured by the lands of its investors.

Byfield in 1714 went to London to lobby on behalf of the land bank interests, and to seek for himself the post of governor, which was open for consideration after the accession of King George I to the throne. He was unsuccessful in acquiring the governorship, but was able to convince Colonel Elizeus Burges, who had been chosen to replace Dudley, to keep Tailer on as lieutenant governor. Burges, however, was bribed by land bank opponents to resign his post before leaving England. The commissions of Burges and Tailer had by then been sent to Massachusetts, and Tailer became acting governor in November 1715 after they were formally proclaimed.

Immediately after taking office Tailer engaged in political housecleaning, eliminating land bank opponents and Dudley supporters from a number of provincial positions. His efforts, however, backfired: the provincial assembly elected Joseph Dudley's son Paul as attorney general, and London agents of the anti-bank party worked to ensure Tailer's replacement. (One of those agents, Jonathan Belcher, would ironically become a Tailer ally in later years and secure the lieutenant governorship for him the third time.) Through their efforts the king chose Colonel Samuel Shute, a land bank opponent, to replace Burges, and William Dummer as Shute's lieutenant governor. Tailer was turned out of office with Shute's arrival in October 1716. Shute deliberately snubbed Tailer upon his arrival, choosing to first meet with the Dudleys instead.

The only major long-term accomplishment of Tailer's tenure as acting governor was the establishment of Boston Light, the first lighthouse built in what is now the United States. While a member of the assembly, Tailer had sat on the legislative committee that drafted the enabling and funding bills, and he signed them after he became governor.

== Provincial military service ==
He next traveled to England. There he lobbied, on behalf of John Nelson, heir to Sir Thomas Temple's claims to Nova Scotia. Nelson sought recompense for the loss of the territory in the 1667 Treaty of Breda, but Tailer's efforts were in vain. He also lobbied on his own behalf for a military pension. He successfully convinced Lord Cobham that he deserved one for his service at Port Royal in 1710, and was awarded the half pay of a colonel, amounting to £400 per year. John Nelson observed that Tailer's loss of the lieutenant governorship (worth £50 per year) "has proved much to his advantage".

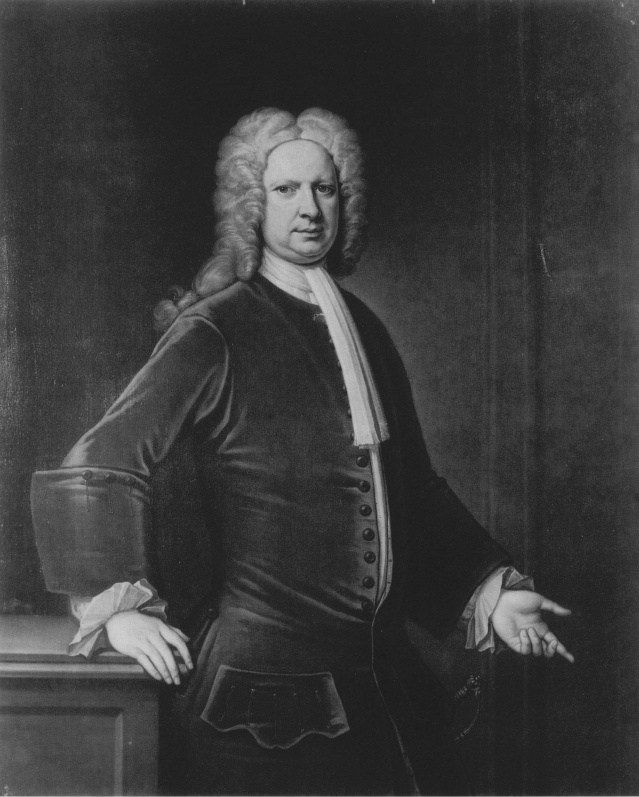
This painting was sold in the early 20th century as a portrait of Tailer by John Smibert. Smibert's signature was determined to be a forgery in the 1940s. Although the painting dates to the early 18th century, its subject is unknown.

Tailer eventually returned to Massachusetts. Under Shute's governorship he was several times involved in negotiations with Indians on the northern frontiers, and continued to be active in the provincial militia. Tailer accompanied Shute on an expedition to Maine to negotiate with the Abenaki of northern New England in 1717. Shute handled the negotiations poorly, raising tensions between the Abenaki and British settlers. In 1720 Tailer was one of several commissioners sent to mediate between the settlers and Abenaki. Although a potential basis for agreement was identified, continued raiding and disagreement on the details of proposed terms caused the situation to deteriorate further. Shute declared war on the Abenaki in July 1722 following raids against British settlements on the Maine coast.

Shute's ongoing conflicts with the provincial assembly prompted him to leave for England in early 1723, leaving handling of the war in Lieutenant Governor Dummer's hands. Tailer was one of the lead members of a party sent in 1723 to Albany, New York in an attempt to convince the Iroquois to join the conflict against the Abenaki. The embassy was unsuccessful: the Iroquois resisted all attempts to bring them into the war against the Abenaki. Tailer continued to be involved in the war, where he was responsible for maintaining Boston's defenses.

== Reprise as acting governor ==
Tailer's politics shifted during the 1720s, and he and Byfield came to align more closely with the populist faction. As a result, he and one-time opponent Jonathan Belcher became allies. When Governor William Burnet died in 1729, Belcher was in London, acting as agent for Connecticut and assisting in lobbying against Burnet's unpopular insistence on a permanent salary. Belcher successfully gained for himself the post of governor, and then secured for Tailer another appointment as lieutenant governor. Tailer's commission was proclaimed before Belcher's arrival, and he briefly served as acting governor while awaiting his superior's arrival. The few months were uneventful, as the province was then suffering from an outbreak of smallpox, because of which Tailer prorogued the assembly.

Tailer died in Dorchester, while serving as lieutenant governor, in March 1731/2. His pallbearers included Governor Belcher and other leading political figures. He is buried in the tomb of his uncle, Willam Stoughton, in what is now called the Dorchester North Burying Ground.

== Notes ==
Political offices
| Preceded by Joseph Dudley | Governor of the Province of Massachusetts Bay (acting); November 9, 1715 – October 5, 1716 | Succeeded by Samuel Shute |
| Preceded by William Dummer (acting) | Governor of the Province of Massachusetts Bay (acting); June 11, 1730 – August 10, 1730 | Succeeded by Jonathan Belcher |
