= William Burnet (colonial administrator) =

British governor of New York and New Jersey

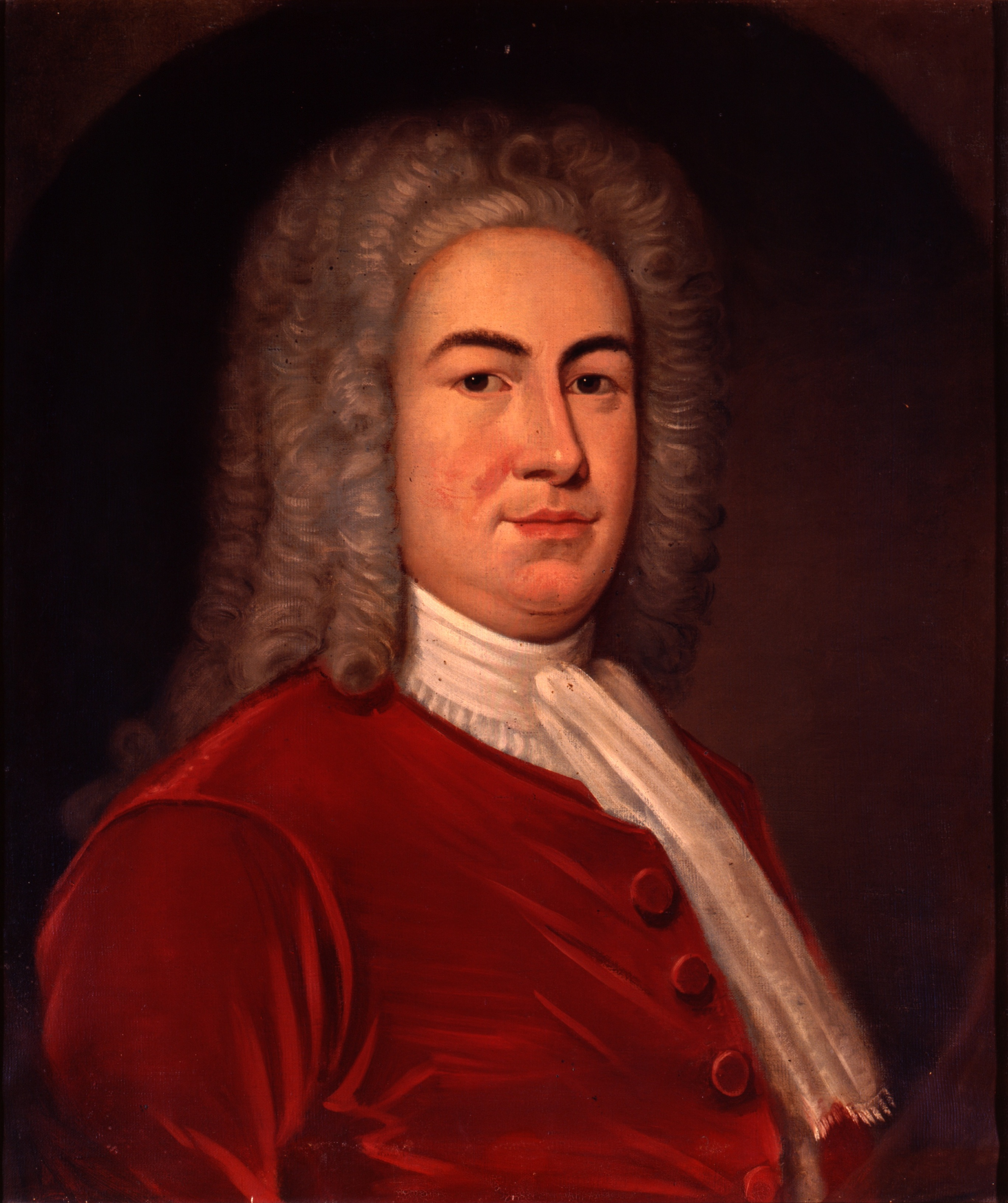
- Portrait by John Watson

Governor of the Province of New York
- In office 1720–1728
- Monarchs: George I; George II
- Preceded by: Peter Schuyler (acting)
- Succeeded by: John Montgomerie

4º Governor of the Province of New Jersey
- In office 1720–1728
- Monarchs: George I; George II
- Preceded by: Lewis Morris, President of Council
- Succeeded by: John Montgomerie

6th Governor of the Province of Massachusetts Bay
- In office 19 July 1728 – 7 September 1729
- Monarch: George II
- Preceded by: William Dummer (acting)
- Succeeded by: William Dummer (acting)

Governor of the Province of New Hampshire
- In office 19 December 1728 – 7 September 1729
- Monarch: George II
- Preceded by: John Wentworth (acting)
- Succeeded by: John Wentworth (acting)

Personal details
- Born: March 1687/8 The Hague, Netherlands
- Died: 7 September 1729 (aged 41) Boston, Massachusetts Bay
- Spouse: Anna Maria Van Horne

William Burnet (March 1687/88 – 7 September 1729) was a British civil servant and colonial administrator who served as governor of New York and New Jersey (1720–1728) and Massachusetts and New Hampshire (1728–1729). Born into a position of privilege (his godfather became William III of England not long after his birth, and his father Gilbert Burnet was later Bishop of Salisbury), Burnet was well-educated, tutored among others by Isaac Newton.

Active for most of his life in intellectual pursuits (he was elected a Fellow of the Royal Society in 1705/6), he occupied no posts of importance until financial considerations and political connections brought him the governorships of New York and New Jersey. His tenure in New Jersey was without major controversies, although he set a precedent there for accepting what were effectively bribes in exchange for his assent to legislation. In New York he sought unsuccessfully to end the fur trade between Albany and Montreal in order to implement a colonial policy preferring direct trade with the Native Americans in central North America. His New York rule was marked by an increase in political divisions between landowners (with whom Burnet sided) and merchants. After the death of King George I, King George II appointed Burnet governor of New Hampshire and Massachusetts.

Although his New Hampshire tenure was inconsequential, he engaged in a nasty dispute with the Massachusetts assembly over the issue of his salary, holding the legislative body in session for six months and relocating it away from Boston. The dispute held up other colonial business, and was ongoing in September 1729 when Burnet died; his death was apparently caused by illness contracted after his carriage overturned and dumped him in water.

== Early life ==
Coat of Arms of William Burnet

William Burnet was born in The Hague, a leading city of the Dutch Republic, in March 1687/8. He was the first child of Mary (Scott) Burnet and Gilbert Burnet, the leading theologian in the Dutch court of William, Prince of Orange (who was Burnet's godfather) and his wife Mary. Mary Scott Burnet was the heiress of a Scottish family which had settled in the Netherlands and acquired great wealth: her marriage to Gilbert however was generally agreed not to be for money, but a genuine love match on both sides. There were six younger children, of whom four survived infancy.

Later in 1688, William led an army across the English Channel in the Glorious Revolution, and William III and Mary II ascended to the English throne as corulers. Burnet's father gave the coronation sermon, was later elevated to Bishop of Salisbury, and was an ongoing influence in the English court during King William's reign. He fell out of favour when Queen Anne took the throne in 1702.

Burnet's mother died of smallpox in 1698; in accordance with her dying request, his father two years later remarried her close friend Elizabeth Blake, who proved a kindly stepmother to William and his siblings. All of them were devoted to Gilbert, "the best of fathers". On Gilbert's death in 1715 William inherited one-third of the estate which, given his mother's wealth, must have been considerable.

Burnet was an excellent but undisciplined scholar. He entered Oxford at the age of 13, but was dismissed for disciplinary reasons. His later education came from private tutoring (including Isaac Newton as a tutor), and he was ultimately admitted to the bar. In 1712 he married Mary, the daughter of George Stanhope, the Dean of Canterbury. They had one child, a boy, before she died in 1717.

== Intellectual pursuits ==
Burnet's rarefied education brought him a lifelong interest in scientific and mathematical pursuits. He was proposed for membership in the Royal Society by Isaac Newton in 1705, and was enrolled as a fellow in February 1705/6. He was acquainted with the mathematician Gottfried Leibniz, and was a regular correspondent on a wide array of scientific subjects with Philadelphia merchant and politician James Logan. He reported to the Royal Society observations of the Grindelwald Glacier in Switzerland, and on an unusual instance of Hungarian conjoined twins he saw while resident in The Hague in 1708. Observations he made of eclipses of the moons of Jupiter while he was governor of New York were used to more precisely determine New York City's longitude. During his tenure in New York he was relatively starved for intellectual discourse; he briefly met a young Benjamin Franklin and encouraged him in his intellectual pursuits.

Like his teacher Isaac Newton, Burnet also wrote on religious subjects. In 1724 he anonymously published An Essay on Scripture Prophecy, Wherein it is Endeavoured to Explain the three periods Contain'd in the Xii Chapter of the Prophet Daniel With some Arguments to make it Probable that the FIRST of the PERIODS did Expire in the Year 1715. In this work he put forward a Millennialist argument that Jesus Christ would return to Earth in 1790, based on his numerological interpretation of the Book of Daniel.

== Governor of New York and New Jersey ==
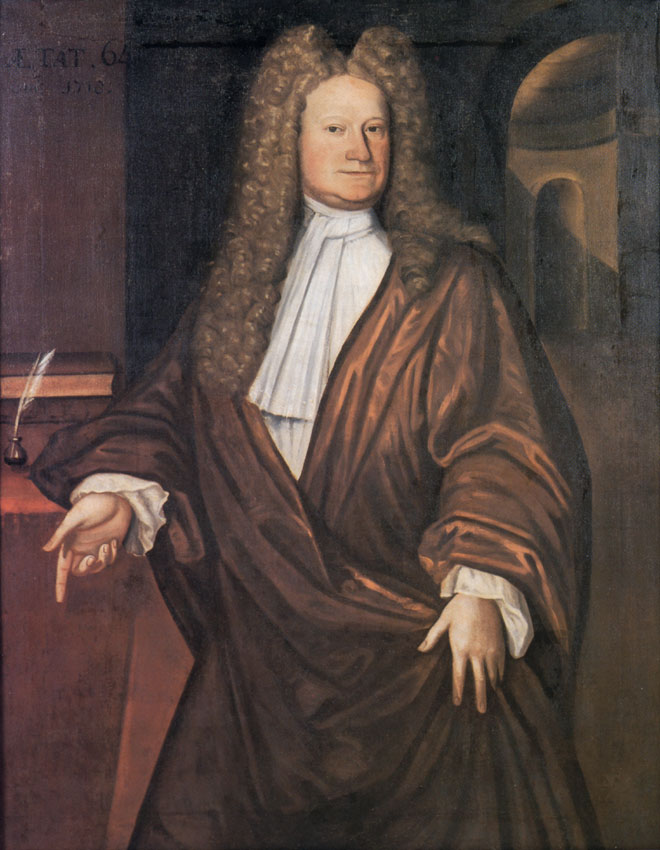
Robert Livingston advised Burnet in New York

Burnet's connections to the court procured for him an appointment as the Comptroller of Customs in Great Britain. He also invested heavily in the South Sea Company, whose collapse in 1720 led him to consider more lucrative positions in the North American colonies. Correspondence with a longtime friend, Robert Hunter, who returned to England in 1719 provided an opportunity: Hunter was then the governor of New York and New Jersey, and he had returned to England for a variety of personal reasons, intending to divest himself of those posts. Hunter and Burnet were both well-connected to the Whig government then in power, so an exchange of their offices was readily approved.

=== New Jersey ===
Burnet's tenure as New Jersey governor was marked by disputes over the issuance of bills of credit and the granting of a permanent salary. Bills of credit, in addition to providing funding for the province's expenses, also circulated as local currency. Issuance of large quantities of such bills had an inflationary tendency to devalue them relative to the pound sterling. Burnet was under instructions to disallow their issuance except under certain conditions. When the provincial assembly in 1721 approved a bill that called for the issuance of £40,000 in bills secured by property mortgages Burnet dissolved the assembly. However, he approved similar legislation in 1723 in exchange for the legislature's approval of a five-year salary plan. When the assembly began appropriating funds from the bills in unapproved ways a few years later, Burnet was again convinced to sign in exchange for a grant of £500 for "incidental expenses". This method by which the assembly essentially bribed the governor for his agreement in violation of instructions became somewhat normal practice in New Jersey with later governors.

=== New York ===
In New York Burnet sided with the large landowners of the province; based on their advice he refused to call elections for the provincial assembly, keeping an assembly dominated by "court party" members for five years. His relationship with the New York assembly only deteriorated after several special elections resulted in the addition of enough "country party" members to elect a hostile speaker. Although he sought to broaden the province's tax base to include larger real estate holdings, the powerful property owners who dominated the assembly and the court party were successful in deflecting these efforts into taxes on merchant interests. One tax, levied on the tonnage of ships docking in New York, led to a rise in smuggling between New Jersey and New York.

Eight months after his arrival in New York, in May 1721, Burnet married again. His bride was Anna Maria Van Horne, the daughter of Abraham and Mary Van Horne and a relative by marriage of Robert Livingston, a powerful New York landowner and one of Burnet's chief advisors. They had four children; she and the last child died not long after its birth in 1727.

=== Indian trading policy ===
One of the more important aspects of Burnet's tenure in New York was his attempts to strengthen the colony's position on the frontier, and its relations with the Iroquois who then controlled most of what is now upstate New York. Since the Iroquois had achieved peace with New France in 1701, a vibrant trade had begun between New York merchants in Albany and French merchants in Montreal. English goods were sold to French traders, who bartered those goods for furs with Native American tribes in central North America. British colonial administrators sought to alter this method of trade, instructing Burnet to direct the trade through the Iroquois lands instead of through Montreal, bringing an end to the Albany-Montreal trade.

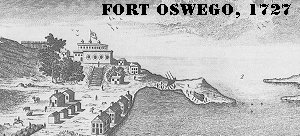
Fort Oswego as it would have appeared in 1727

Not long after his arrival in New York, Burnet had the assembly pass a law banning the Albany-Montreal trade. This action earned him opposition from merchant interests that traded directly with New France, including the Huguenot Stephen DeLancey and other Albany merchants. Two vocal merchants, Adolph Philipse and Pieter Schuyler, sat on the governor's council, and were removed by Burnet in 1721. The law was fairly easily circumvented: the merchants routed the trade goods through nearby Mohawks who then carried goods to and from Montreal. A law stiffening enforcement of the trade ban was passed in 1722. These policies caused protest not only in New York, but also in London, where British merchants argued that they were having a negative impact on trade volume to Europe.

In 1723 Burnet was informed that the French had begun construction of Fort Niagara at the western end of Lake Ontario; this action presented a clear threat to British attempts to more directly access and control the fur trade. He consequently ordered the construction of Fort Oswego at the mouth of the Oswego River. This decision not only upset Albany traders, who would lose their monopoly on the fur trade, but also upset the French (because it gave the British direct access to Lake Ontario) and the Iroquois, who had wanted a fort sited at Lake Oneida instead. Burnet tried to placate the Iroquois by stationing militia forces in the Oneida area, but they also resented this intrusion.

Burnet's attempts to implement the trade policy were ultimately unsuccessful. In 1725 the merchant interests, Stephen DeLancey among them, succeeded in gaining seats in the assembly through special elections, and Burnet's decision to question the citizenship of the Huguenot DeLancey (and thus his right to a seat in the assembly) angered many moderates in that body. In the following years the assembly was noticeably more hostile to his rule The trade ban was repealed in 1726 and replaced by a system of taxation designed to prefer western trade over the Albany-Montreal trade. By the time of his departure in 1727 it was clear that this policy was also not working, and in some cases was having negative effects. All laws respecting Indian trade that passed during his administration were repealed in 1729; the only long-term effects were the establishment of the British military presence at Oswego, and the breaking of Albany's monopoly on trade. Burnet also left New York more fractionally divided between merchants and landowners than when he arrived.

=== Replacement ===
In 1727 King George I died, an event that required the renewal of royal commissions. George II decided to give the New York and New Jersey governorships to Colonel John Montgomerie, who had served him as a Groom of the Bedchamber. Burnet was instead given appointment as governor of Massachusetts and New Hampshire.

After it became known in New York that Burnet would be replaced, the assembly, at the instigation of Stephen DeLancey, as a parting shot formally protested Burnet's actions as a chancery court judge, declaring that his judgments would be null and void. Montgomerie arrived in New York on 15 April 1728, carrying Burnet's commissions; Burnet left New York in July for Boston.

== Governor of Massachusetts and New Hampshire ==
Burnet was only briefly in New Hampshire during his short tenure, where unlike Massachusetts he was readily granted a salary for three years or the duration of his administration. At the time of his appointment to the Massachusetts seat, the province had been governed for a number of years by Lieutenant Governor William Dummer, acting for Governor Samuel Shute. Burnet made a hardnosed attempt to force the Massachusetts assembly to grant him a permanent salary. Since the institution of the royal charter in 1692, the assembly had steadfastly resisted this, choosing instead to make periodic grants to the governor. Local politicians found this an effective mechanism for influencing the governor to approve their policies since the governor would never know when the next grant would be made, or how large it would be. The salary matter was one of many that had vexed Governor Shute during his time in the province. Dummer, a wealthy Massachusetts native, had been more conciliatory, only insisting that control of the provincial militia remain in his hands.

Burnet chose to take an extremely hard line on the subject of the salary: he refused to conduct any other business, or to dissolve the legislature, until the salary was decided. The legislature in turn refused to enact a salary bill, although it offered generous one-time grants that Burnet refused on principle. He further raised tensions by implicitly suggesting that the assembly's failure to act on the salary might jeopardize the colonial charter. In order to make life as difficult as possible for the legislators, Burnet relocated the assembly from Boston first to Salem and then Cambridge, increasing the costs of the legislators and forcing many of them from the comforts of their Boston-area properties. In November 1728 the assembly voted to send agents to London to argue their side of the issue with the Board of Trade. Its attempts to appropriate funds for the agents were denied by the governor's council, and the agents ended up being paid from funds raised by subscription.

In May 1729 the Board of Trade ruled, siding with Governor Burnet, but the assembly still refused to yield. Attempts to conduct business on other matters invariably became caught up in the salary dispute, and thus stalled. The dispute was still ongoing when Burnet, en route from Cambridge to Boston on 31 August, was thrown into the water when his carriage accidentally overturned. He fell ill, and died on 7 September 1729. He was interred in the King's Chapel Burying Ground in Boston.

Lieutenant Governor Dummer again acted as governor until Burnet's replacement (Jonathan Belcher, one of the agents who had been sent to London) was selected and returned to the province. He took a similar position as Burnet, refusing annual grants until he was replaced as lieutenant (and acting) governor by William Tailer, who acquiesced to annual grants. Jonathan Belcher, who became governor later in 1730, was at first instructed as Burnet was on the matter of the salary, but during his tenure, the Boards of Trade finally abandoned the instruction, and allowed him to receive annual grants.

== See also ==
- List of colonial governors of New Jersey
- List of colonial governors of New York
- List of colonial governors of Massachusetts
- List of colonial governors of New Hampshire

== Notes ==
Government offices
| Preceded by Pieter Schuyler (acting) | Governor of the Province of New York; 1720–1728 | Succeeded by John Montgomerie |
| Preceded by New Jersey Council (acting) | Governor of the Province of New Jersey; 1720–1728 | Succeeded by John Montgomerie |
| Preceded by William Dummer (acting) | Governor of the Province of Massachusetts Bay; 19 July 1728 – 7 September 1729 | Succeeded by William Dummer (acting) |
| Preceded by John Wentworth (acting) | Governor of the Province of New Hampshire; 19 December 1728 – 7 September 1729 | Succeeded by John Wentworth (acting) |
