= Paul Dudley (jurist) =

American lawyer

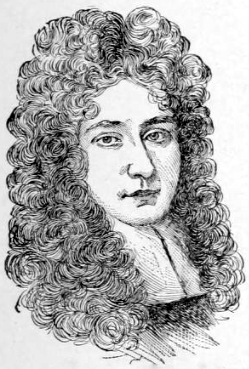

Chief Justice of the Massachusetts Superior Court of Judicature
- In office 1745–1751
- Appointed by: William Shirley
- Preceded by: Benjamin Lynde Sr.
- Succeeded by: Stephen Sewall

Associate Justice of the Massachusetts Superior Court of Judicature
- In office 1718–1745
- Appointed by: Samuel Shute
- Preceded by: Samuel Sewall
- Succeeded by: Nathaniel Hubbard

1st Attorney General of Massachusetts
- In office 1702–1718
- Governor: Joseph Dudley; William Tailer; Samuel Shute
- Preceded by: Office established
- Succeeded by: John Valentine

Personal details
- Born: September 3, 1675 Roxbury, Massachusetts Bay Colony
- Died: January 25, 1751 (aged 75) Roxbury, Province of Massachusetts Bay
- Education: Harvard University

Paul Dudley, FRS (September 3, 1675 – January 25, 1751) was an American lawyer who served as the Massachusetts Attorney General. He was the son of colonial governor Joseph Dudley and grandson of one of the colony's founders, Thomas Dudley.

Dudley was born in Roxbury, Massachusetts in 1675. After graduating from the Roxbury Latin School and then, at the age of 15, from Harvard in 1690, he studied law at the Temple in London, and became Attorney General of Massachusetts from 1702 to 1718. He was associate justice of the province's highest court, the Superior Court of Judicature, from 1718 to 1745, and chief justice from 1745 until his death in January 1751.

He was a member of the Royal Society, to whose Transactions he contributed several valuable papers on the natural history of New England, as well as the founder of the Dudleian lectures on religion at Harvard University. Dudley was an investor in the Equivalent Lands. Along with his brother, William, he was the first proprietor and namesake of Dudley, Massachusetts. In 1705, Dudley was recorded as owning an enslaved boy, and he acquired another slave in 1745 named Guinea.

Dudley died in Roxbury, and is buried in the Eliot Burying Ground next to his father and grandfather.
