= George Vaughan (New Hampshire official) =

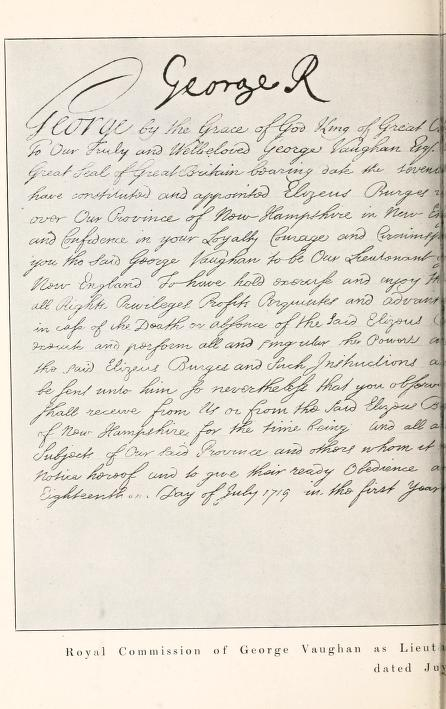
- Royal Commission of George Vaughan

Lieutenant Governor of the Province of New Hampshire
- In office 18 July 1715 – 30 September 1717
- Preceded by: John Usher
- Succeeded by: John Wentworth

Personal details
- Born: 13 April 1676; Portsmouth, New Hampshire, United States
- Died: 20 November 1725 (aged 49)
- Spouse(s): Mary Belcher (m. 1697; died 1699) Elizabeth Eliott
- Children: Sarah, William Vaughan, Margaret, Elizabeth, Abigail, Eliot, Mary, Jane, George
- Parent(s): William Vaughan and Margaret Cutt
- Occupation: councilor, merchant, Colonel of the New Hampshire militia

George Vaughan (New Hampshire) (13 April 1676 – 20 November 1725) may be best known for being Lieutenant Governor of the Province of New Hampshire for only one year. A graduate of Harvard College in 1696, he was also at various times a merchant, colonel of militia, agent for the province to England, and counsellor.

== Life ==
George Vaughan was born in 1676 to William Vaughan (military officer) and Margaret Cutt Vaughan. His father was a representative of an English trading firm who migrated to the Province of New Hampshire, where he became a wealthy merchant. His mother also came from a family of merchants, one of whom, her uncle John Cutt, was the first royally appointed governor of the province. Vaughan graduated from Harvard College in 1696, and entered the family business in Portsmouth.

In 1697 he married Mary Belcher, the daughter of Massachusetts merchant Andrew Belcher (and sister to future governor Jonathan Belcher). She died in 1699, not long after giving birth to a daughter who also did not survive. In January 1700 he married Mary Elliot.

== Career ==
When Queen Anne's War broke out in 1702, Vaughan joined the provincial militia, in which he was commissioned a colonel. In 1707 he was chosen by the provincial assembly as the colonial agent, and traveled to London. He was able to parlay his London connections into an appointment as the province's lieutenant governor in 1715. He assumed this office in October 1715, during the governorship of Joseph Dudley. Dudley was also governor of neighboring Massachusetts, and did not come to New Hampshire before his replacement in October 1716 by Colonel Samuel Shute, who was also commissioned governor of both provinces. As a result, Vaughan acted as governor during this time.

Vaughan and Shute disagreed on exactly what powers Vaughan held when Shute was not physically present in the province. Vaughan insisted that he had the full powers of the governor during Shute's absence, while Shute felt that Vaughan's powers were limited. The conflict contributed to Vaughan's removal from office in October 1717. Sources disagree on his departure from office:

He "resigned his office, after some months of controversy. This was occasioned by his opinions on some important measures not agreeing fully with those of the General Assembly, especially on the excise and impost laws."

"In 1716, Samuel Shute, a resident of Massachusetts, was appointed governor of that province and of New Hampshire, and soon after a controversy arose between these two highest officials. The Lieutenant Governor claimed that he was the true and sole executive, when the Governor was absent from the Province, and thereby became vested in all of the prerogatives pertaining to that office. He therefore declined to obey the mandate of his superior, when issued from Massachusetts.

"... On the 30th day of September, 1717, Lieutenant-Governor Vaughan was removed from office ...."
