= John Wentworth (lieutenant governor, born 1671) =

American sea captain, merchant, and politician (1671–1730)

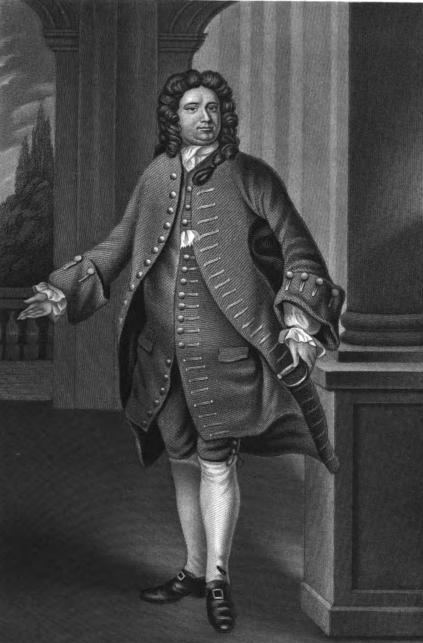

Lieutenant governor of New Hampshire
- In office 1717–1730
- Monarchs: George I (1717–1727); George II (1727–1730)
- Preceded by: George Vaughan
- Succeeded by: David Dunbar

Personal details
- Born: January 16, 1671 Portsmouth, New Hampshire
- Died: December 12, 1730 (aged 59) Portsmouth, New Hampshire
- Spouse: Sarah Hunking
- Children: 14, including Benning
- Parent(s): Samuel Wentworth; Mary Benning
- Occupation: Sea captain, merchant, judge, politician, colonial administrator
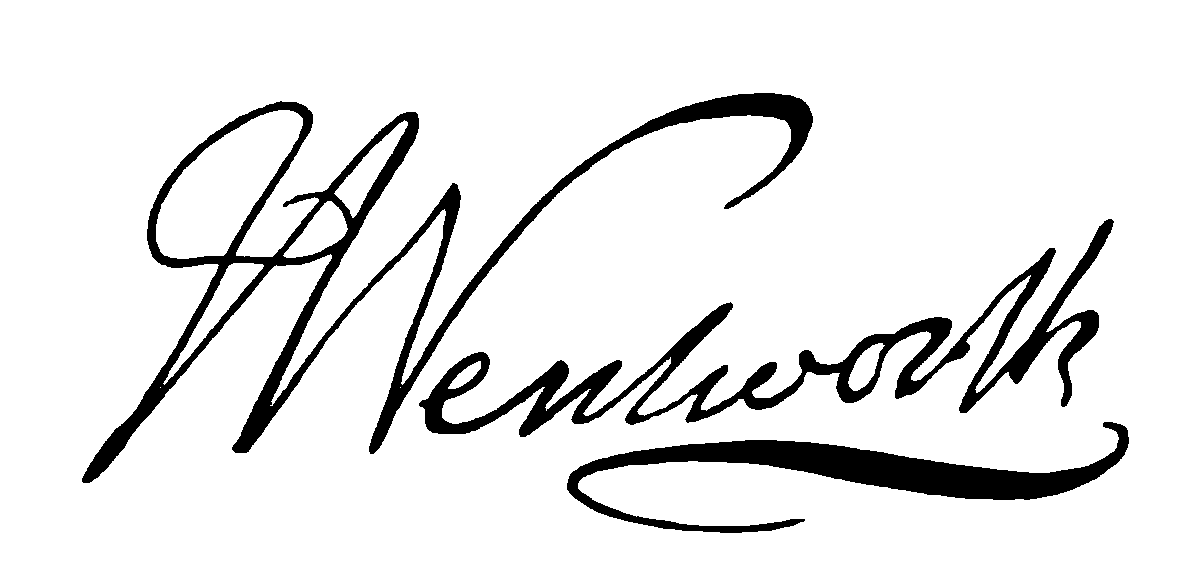
- Signature

John Wentworth (January 16, 1671 – December 12, 1730) was an American sea captain, merchant, politician, judge and colonial administrator who served as the lieutenant governor of New Hampshire from 1717 to 1730.

== Early life ==
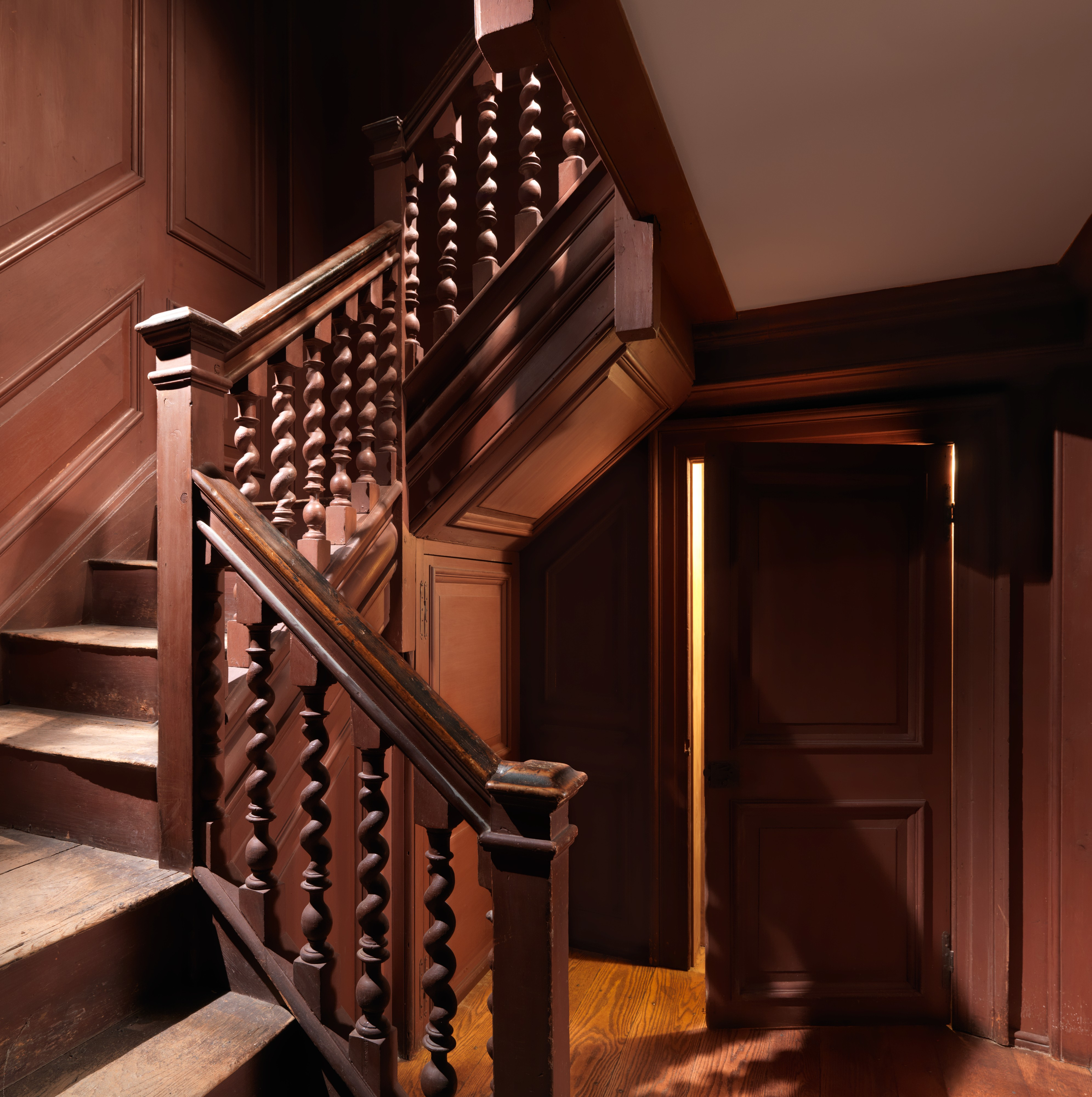
The Metropolitan Museum of Art purchased the Wentworth house in 1926, and moved portions of the interior to the museum. The house was unusually grand in scale, and the spiral-turned balusters are the earliest known in New England.

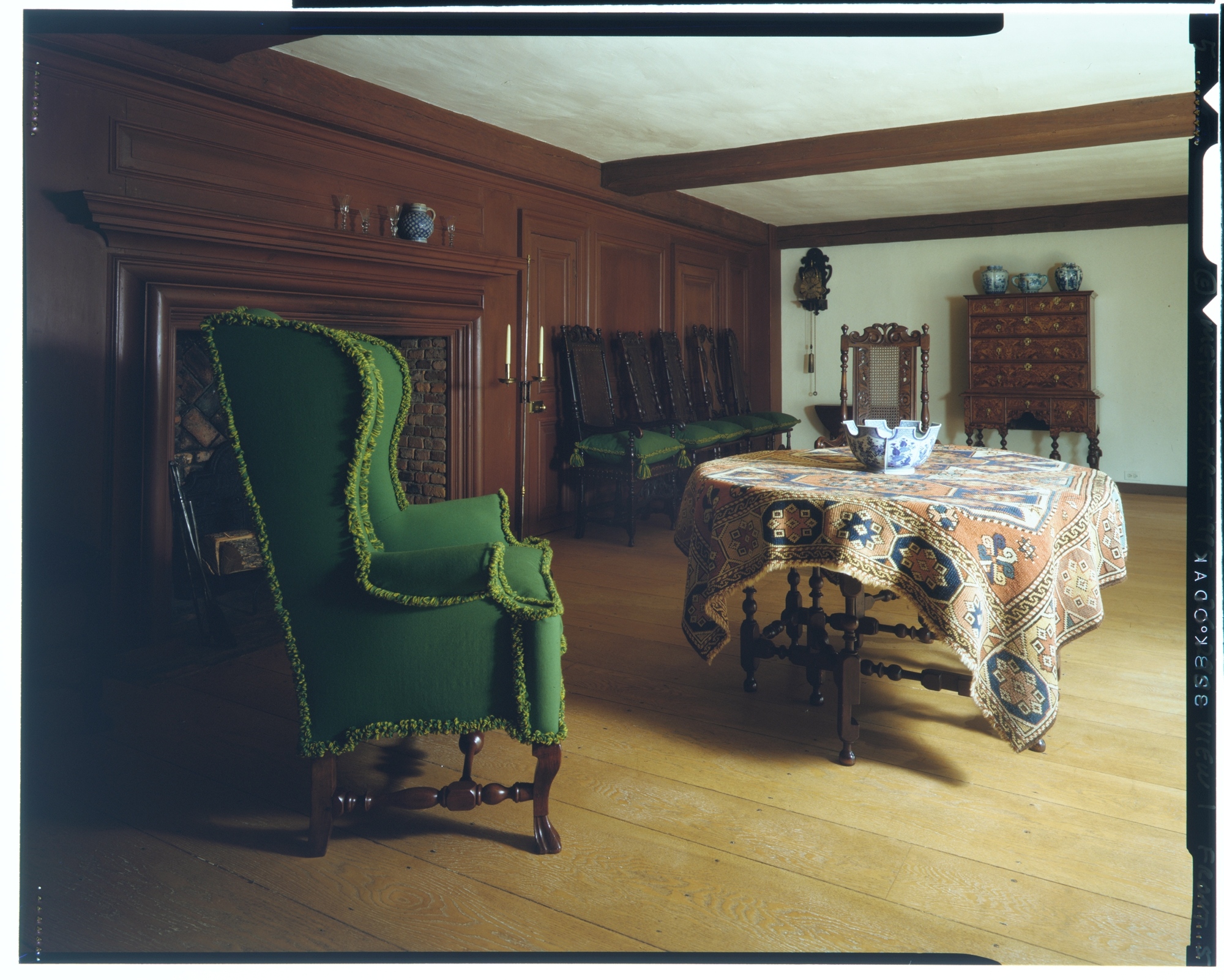
Interior of the John Wentworth house, now in the Metropolitan Museum of Art in New York City.

He was a grandson of "Elder" William Wentworth (born at Alford, Lincolnshire, England, in 1615; died in Dover, New Hampshire, March 16, 1697), an early settler in New England. William was a follower of the Rev. John Wheelwright. With him and 33 others, William signed, August 4, 1639, “A Combination for a Government at Exeter, N. H.” William moved to Wells, Maine, with Wheelwright; and when the latter went to England on the accession of Oliver Cromwell to power, William moved to Dover, where he was a ruling elder and often preached. On his death, he left a widow, nine sons, and one daughter.

== Political career ==
John Wentworth was raised to be a sea captain. In 1712 he was appointed by Queen Anne a councillor for New Hampshire; in 1713 he became a justice of the common pleas, and late in 1717 lieutenant governor. Before New Hampshire received its own Royal Governor in 1741, its governors were also commissioned to govern the neighboring Province of Massachusetts Bay, where they spent most of their time. Consequently, the lieutenant governors exercised significant power. As lieutenant governor, John Wentworth had little function in the government for several years. Then in January 1723, Governor Samuel Shute abruptly returned to England, so Wentworth took over in New Hampshire, governing until the arrival of Shute's replacement, William Burnet, in 1728. He continued as Lt. Governor until his death in 1730, again governing between Burnet's death in 1729 and the arrival of Jonathan Belcher in 1730. During his administration he brought focus on the border dispute between New Hampshire and Massachusetts, cultivating power centers in London that eventually led to resolution of that dispute (albeit in 1740, long after his death), and establishing the dynasty that would dominate New Hampshire until independence.

== Family ==
On October 12, 1693, Wentworth married Sara Hunking. The couple had thirteen children, three of whom (Samuel, Benning, and Mark Hunking Wentworth) would become prominent themselves. Benning Wentworth was later the first directly appointed royal governor of New Hampshire. Mark's son in his turn would also become the last royal governor, Sir John Wentworth, 1st Baronet.
