= Explanatory Charter =

The Explanatory Charter was a supplement to the royal charter of the Province of Massachusetts Bay issued by King George I on August 26, 1725. The provincial charter, issued by William III and Mary II in 1691, was modified, and certain of its terms were clarified (hence the name "explanatory" being applied to this charter).

== Background ==
The issuance of the Explanatory Charter was the result of a series of disputes between the Massachusetts General Court, the elected body representing the people of the province, and the crown-appointed royal governor, Samuel Shute. In 1720 Shute claimed the authority to veto the General Court's choice of speaker, and dissolved the legislature when it refused to elect someone else. He was again upset that the legislature voted to adjourn for one week in 1721, claiming it violated his authority to control the legislature's meetings. He raised these issues with the Privy Council of George I, which in 1725 issued the Explanatory Charter.

== Charter ==
The modification of the William and Mary charter granted the governor the power to suspend the House of Representatives. It also clarified that the House of Representatives was allowed to choose its own speaker, subject to the governor's approval, and that it was allowed to adjourn for no more than two days.

== Later modifications to the Massachusetts provincial charter ==
In 1766, another attempt was made to further modify the Explanatory Charter. The result was the choice of the council and superior court judges to be taken away from the legislature, appointment of sheriffs given to the governor, the selection of juries to the sheriffs, and forbade town meetings, except for elections or by special permission of the governor.

In the wake of the 1773 Boston Tea Party, the British Parliament approved a series of acts, known as the Intolerable Acts, designed to punish Massachusetts in particular. One of these acts, the Massachusetts Government Act, essentially suspended the charter and gave the crown-appointed governor wide-ranging powers.

General Thomas Gage was appointed royal governor in 1774, and implemented the Massachusetts Government Act, dissolving the provincial legislature. Members of the legislature met anyway, and established the Massachusetts Provincial Congress, which de facto governed most or all of Massachusetts from 1774 until the ratification of a Constitution or Form of Government for the Commonwealth of Massachusetts in 1780.
