= Governor Belcher =

Governor Belcher may refer to:

- Jonathan Belcher (jurist) (1710–1776), Governor of Nova Scotia from 1760 to 1763
- Jonathan Belcher (1682–1757), Governor of the Province of Massachusetts Bay from 1730 to 1741
