= The Examination of a Witch (painting) =

Painting of a suspected witch, Mary Fisher

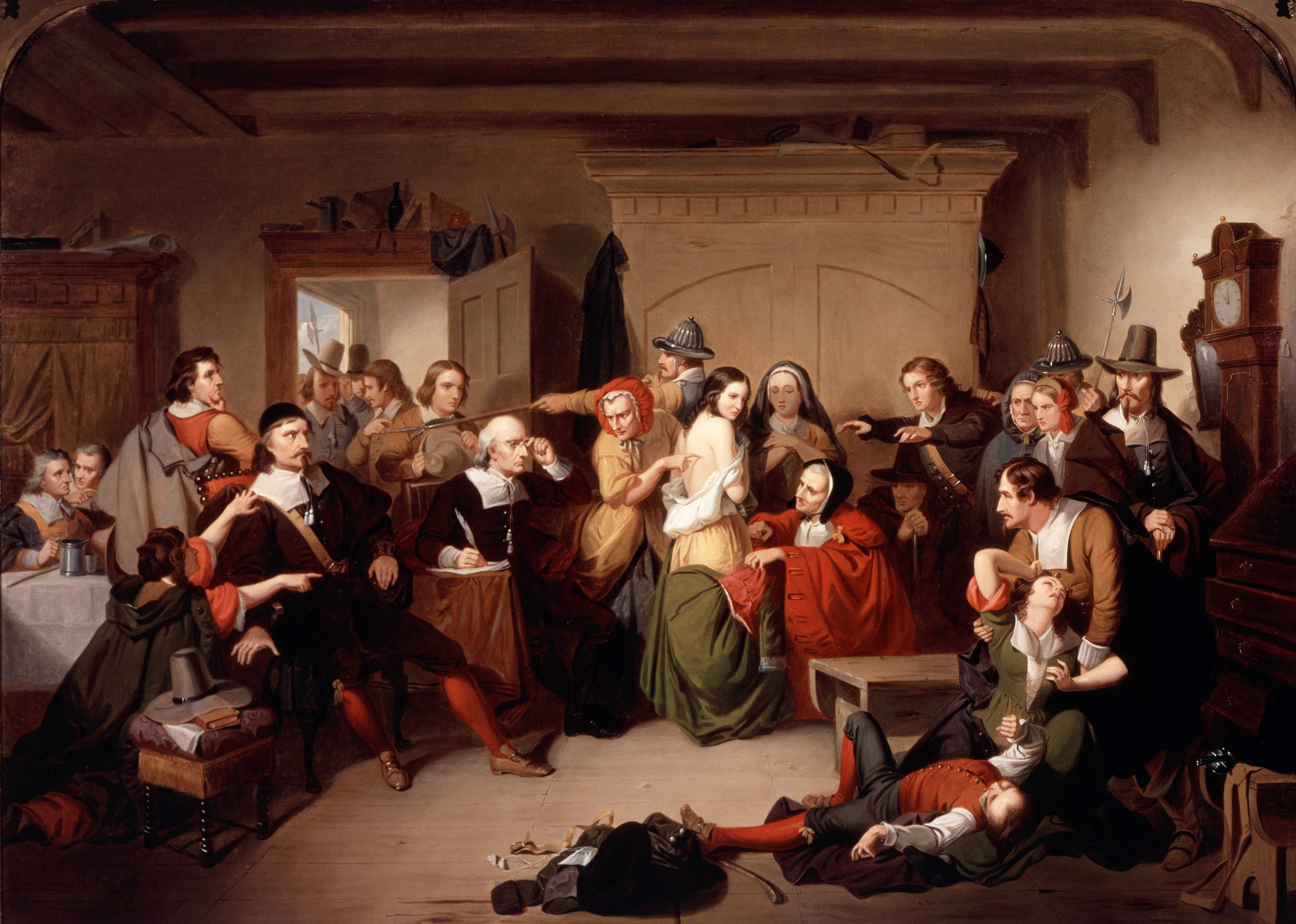
- Artist: Thompkins H. Matteson
- Year: 1853
- Type: oil on canvas
- Dimensions: 97.79 cm × 137.16 cm (38.50 in × 54.00 in)
- Location: Peabody Essex Museum, also Darwin R. Barker Museum

The Examination of a Witch is a painting by T. H. Matteson. There are two versions of the painting, one in the Peabody Essex Museum in Salem, Massachusetts, the other in the Portrait Gallery of the Darwin R. Barker Museum.

== The time the painting was set ==
The painting may represent an event in 1692, during the Salem witch trials, the subject being one Mary Fisher. The year of 1656 is more likely, as Mary was then captured with Ann Austin, which makes 1692 less likely than 1656.

As Mary Fisher was a Quaker, the Puritans did not welcome her, having condemned the Boston martyrs, a group of Quakers, to death. In the painting, some have visibly fainted. Note how she is being shamefully stripped to determine whether or not she was a witch, but the witches' mark is on her, confirming her guilt.

== Inspiration ==
At the first exhibition of the painting in New York in 1848, T. H. Matteson exhibited an earlier version of this painting, using as his inspiration a quotation from John Greenleaf Whittier's book Supernaturalism of New England. Matteson quoted Whittier, "Mary Fisher, a young girl, was seized upon by Deputy Governor Bellingham in the absence of Governor Endicott, and shamefully stripped for the purpose of ascertaining whether she was a witch, with the Devil's mark upon her.". Richard Bellingham left office, in 1672, adding doubt, about the year of 1692. Whittier's entire quote follows:

Cotton Mather attributes the plague of witchcraft in New England in about an equal degree to the Quakers and Indians. The first of the sect who visited Boston, Ann Austin and Mary Fisher, the latter a young girl, were seized upon by Deputy Governor Bellingham in the absence of Gov. Endicott, and shamefully stripped naked for the purpose of ascertaining whether they were witches, with the devil’s mark on them. In 1662 Elizabeth Horton and Joan Broksop, two venerable preachers of the sect, were arrested in Boston, charged by Governor Endicott with being witches, and carried two days' journey into the woods, and left to the tender mercies of Indians and wolves.

== See also ==
- Cultural depictions of the Salem witch trials
- History of the Puritans in North America
- Increase Mather
- List of people of the Salem witch trials
- Protests against early modern witch trials
- Quakers in North America
- Timeline of the Salem witch trials
- Samuel Willard
- Witchcraft
- Witches' mark

== External links and references ==
- One site that writes of the painting
- mtsu.edu site
- A fourth site
- Confirms the painting as oil-on-canvas
- Mentions the painting's dimensions
