= Andrew Belcher =

Andrew Belcher may refer to:

- Andrew Belcher (merchant, born 1706) (1706–1771), American merchant and Governor's Council member in the Province of Massachusetts Bay
- Andrew Belcher (merchant, born 1763) (1763–1841), British North American merchant and politician in Halifax, Nova Scotia
