= Witch's mark =

Hypothetical mark on the body indicating a person was a witch

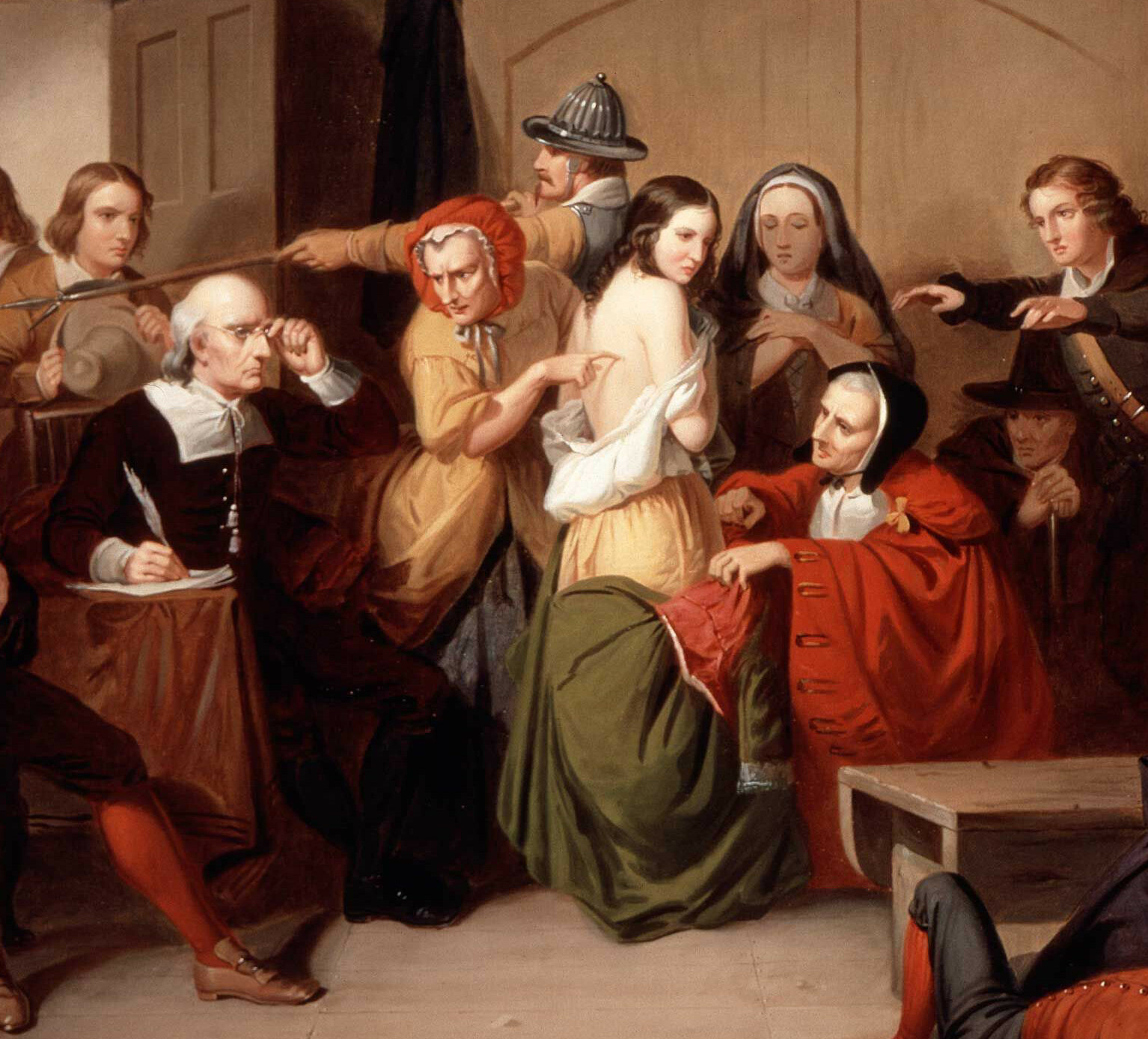
Detail of the oil painting Examination of a witch by Tompkins Harrison Matteson (1853)

A witch's mark, devil's mark or stigma diabolicum was a bodily mark that witch-hunters believed indicated that an individual was a witch, during the height of the witch trials. The beliefs about the mark differed, depending on the trial location and the accusation made against the witch. Use of the term is found earliest in the 16th century, and reaching its peak in 1645, but then essentially disappearing by 1700.

The Witch or Devil's mark was believed to be the permanent marking of the Devil on his initiates to seal their obedience and service to him. He is said to create the mark by raking his claw across their flesh, licking the skin to produce a death skull pattern, or using a hot iron to produce a blue or red brand. The Devil was thought to mark the individual at the end of nocturnal initiation rites.

The witch's teat was a raised bump somewhere on a witch's body. It is often depicted as having a wart-like appearance.

The term "witches' mark" is also used to describe marks carved into the walls of buildings to protect them and their occupants from evil due to demons, witches or the evil eye.

== Premodern understandings of bodily markings ==
Before English Christendom, the ancient Greeks marked the flesh of individuals deemed to be morally depraved, such as criminals and enslaved people. These marks, called "stigma," would be manufactured through the burning or cutting of a deviant's skin. Per sociologist Erving Goffman, these stigma signified that a bearer was "a blemished person, ritually polluted, to be avoided, especially in public places." As Christianity became a dominant force in Europe, "stigma" adopted additional meanings, coming to be understood as proof of both physical maladies and divine grace. The stigma of witch's marks, were thus seen as indications of collaboration with the Devil.

== Beliefs about the mark on witches ==
The witch's teat is associated with the perceived perversion of maternal power by witches in early modern England. The witch's teat is associated with the feeding of witches' imps or familiars; the witch's familiar supposedly aided the witch in her magic in exchange for nourishment (blood) from sacrificial animals or from the witch's teat. It is also where the devil supposedly suckles when he comes at night to bed his faithful servants, sometimes impregnating them with his seed. Once the devilish half-breed has been conceived, the cambion may only feed upon this teat and no other. Folklore suggests that on the 7th day of the 7th week of consecutive feeding upon the teat, the cambion would grow to adulthood immediately and begin wreaking havoc with a range of demonic powers inherited from its supernatural father. However, should the ritual be disrupted during the 49-day period, the process has to restart all over again.

All witches and wizards were believed to have a witch's mark waiting to be found. A person accused of witchcraft was brought to trial and carefully scrutinized. The entire body was suspect as a canvas for a mark, an indicator of a pact with Satan. Witch's marks were commonly believed to include moles, warts, birthmarks, skin tags, supernumerary nipples, and insensitive patches of skin. Experts, or inquisitors, firmly believed that a witch's mark could be easily identified from a natural mark; in light of this belief, protests from the victims that the marks were natural were often ignored.

== Early Modern Witch Trials ==
Authorities in the witch trials routinely stripped an accused witch of clothing and shaved all body hair so that no potential mark could be hidden. Pins were driven into scars, calluses and thickened areas of skin: the practice of "pricking a witch". Customarily, this routine was performed in front of a large crowd. Medieval inquisitors also believed that the Devil left invisible marks upon his followers. If after stripping and shaving, the accused witch was found to have no likely blemishes, pins were simply driven into her body until an insensitive area was found. The search for witch's marks had disappeared by 1700.

The violence used against accused witches in order to discover the witch's mark included torture; "To try to force a confession, priest applied hot fat repeatedly to Catherine Boyraionne's eyes and her armpits, the pit of her stomach, her thighs, her elbows, and 'dans sa nature' – in her vagina. She died in prison, no doubt from injuries."

During the witch-trials in early modern Europe, individuals were employed to help aid in the discovery and conviction of witches. These individuals were given the title "witch finders". Perhaps the most famous witchfinder was a man named Matthew Hopkins (c. 1620–1647), who claimed to be the "Witch Finder General". Hopkins's writings reached the height of their popularity during the English Civil War (c. 1645), and contributed to the use of the witch's mark as evidence of guilt. The record shows that two Scottish women disguised themselves as men, known as "Mr. Dickson" and "Mr. Peterson", so they, too, could become witch-finders.

== Historiography ==
=== Pagan tattoos hypothesis ===
As far as the historical study of the witch's mark goes, historians are split into different camps. The first camp, sometimes called "Murray-ists", supports British anthropologist Margaret Murray's theory of the witch's mark. Historical discussion of the witch's mark began after the publication of Murray's books on the subject, Witchcult in Western Europe and The God of the Witches, in the early 20th century. Her writings argue strongly that Devil's marks were in actuality tattoos that identified members of an organized pagan religion that she believed flourished in the Middle Ages. After the publication of her work, the historical community became divided between Murrayist and non-Murrayist scholars: "When the Witchcult in Western Europe appeared in 1921, it broke this deadlock; yes, said Murray, witches had indeed been up to something of which society disapproved, but it was in no way supernatural; they were merely members of an underground movement secretly keeping pagan rituals alive in Christian Europe." Murray's work became widely accepted and she was considered an expert in witchcraft studies after its publication. Murray is also credited with the renewed interest in neo-pagan religions, and later, Wicca, which occurred after the publications of her books. However, today her controversial ideas have been largely rejected by scientists and academics due to the lack of any evidence.

=== From a feminist perspective ===
==== Anne Barstow ====
Another camp believes that the witch's mark is a gendered aspect of the witch-hunts. In Anne Barstow's book, Witchcraze: A New History of the European Witch Hunts, the witch's mark is viewed from a feminist perspective. Barstow sees the witch hunts of Europe as an attempt to control women, and the witch's mark as an excuse to control women's bodies through violence and sadism. The searching of women's bodies for the witch's mark gives insight into the reality of a woman's position during this time: "when 'a personable and good-like woman' was defended by one of the local gentry the pricker argued that, having been accused, she must be tried anyway". Barstow views the violent and sexual nature of the witch's mark examinations in the witch trials to be further evidence that the witch-hunts were, in fact, "women-hunts".

==== Deborah Willis: Fear of maternal power theory ====
English Literature professor Deborah Willis, who writes from a feminist perspective, asserts that the witch-hunts resulted from a societal fear of maternal power. Willis argues that the people of early modern Europe all had similar fears about malevolent motherly nurturing, and that the witch's teat is a manifestation of that fear. Willis asserts that the witch's teat is a perversion of the female power to nourish and strengthen young.

==== J. M. Garrett ====
J. M. Garrett argues that the judicial proceedings surrounding witchcraft in early modern Europe, specifically the search for witch's marks, served as an outlet for an intrusive investigation into women's bodies and sexualities. She discusses instances where judicial courts found it necessary to shave women's body hair or inspect their genitalia in order to prove guilt.

=== Lyme disease theory ===
The witch's mark also factors into the theory proposed by M. M. Drymon that Lyme disease is a diagnosis for both witches and witch affliction, finding that many of the afflicted and accused in Salem and elsewhere lived in areas that were tick-risky, had a variety of red marks and rashes that looked like bite marks on their skin, and suffered from neurological and arthritic symptoms. The appearance of the witch's mark in Europe is only noted after Columbian contact with the New World in 1492 and may be the result of the transfer of a virulent form of borrelia infection from America into Europe, especially in areas under the control of the Spanish Empire, including parts of the Rhine River Valley that are now in Germany. This topic is the subject of a recent work in the study of witchcraft. This theory is an expansion of the idea first proposed by Laurie Winn Carlson that the bewitched in Salem suffered from encephalitis. Lyme disease is probably the only form of mild or acute encephalitis that is accompanied by a round red mark or bull's eye rash on the skin, which can appear after tick attachment.

== See also ==
- Deal with the Devil
- Witchcraft

== Bibliography ==
1. Barstow, Anne Llewellyn. Witchcraze: A New History of the European Witch Hunts. USA: Pandora: A Division of HarperCollins Publishers, 1994.
2. Davies, Owen. Witchcraft, Magic and Culture 1736–1951. New York: St. Martin's Press, Inc., 1999.
3. Drymon, M.M. Disguised as the Devil:How Lyme Disease Created Witches and Changed History. New York: Wythe Avenue Press, 2008.
4. Murray, Margaret A. "The Devil's Mark". Man, Vol. 18, (Oct., 1918), pp. 148–153. Royal Anthropological Institute of Great Britain and Ireland. JSTOR 2788131.
5. Murray, Margaret A. The God of the Witches. New York: Oxford University Press, 1970.
6. Willis, Deborah. Malevolent Nurture: Witch-Hunting and Maternal Power in Early Modern Europe. New York: Cornell University Press, 1995.
