= Belcher-Rowe House =

Historic house in Massachusetts, United States

- U.S. National Register of Historic Places
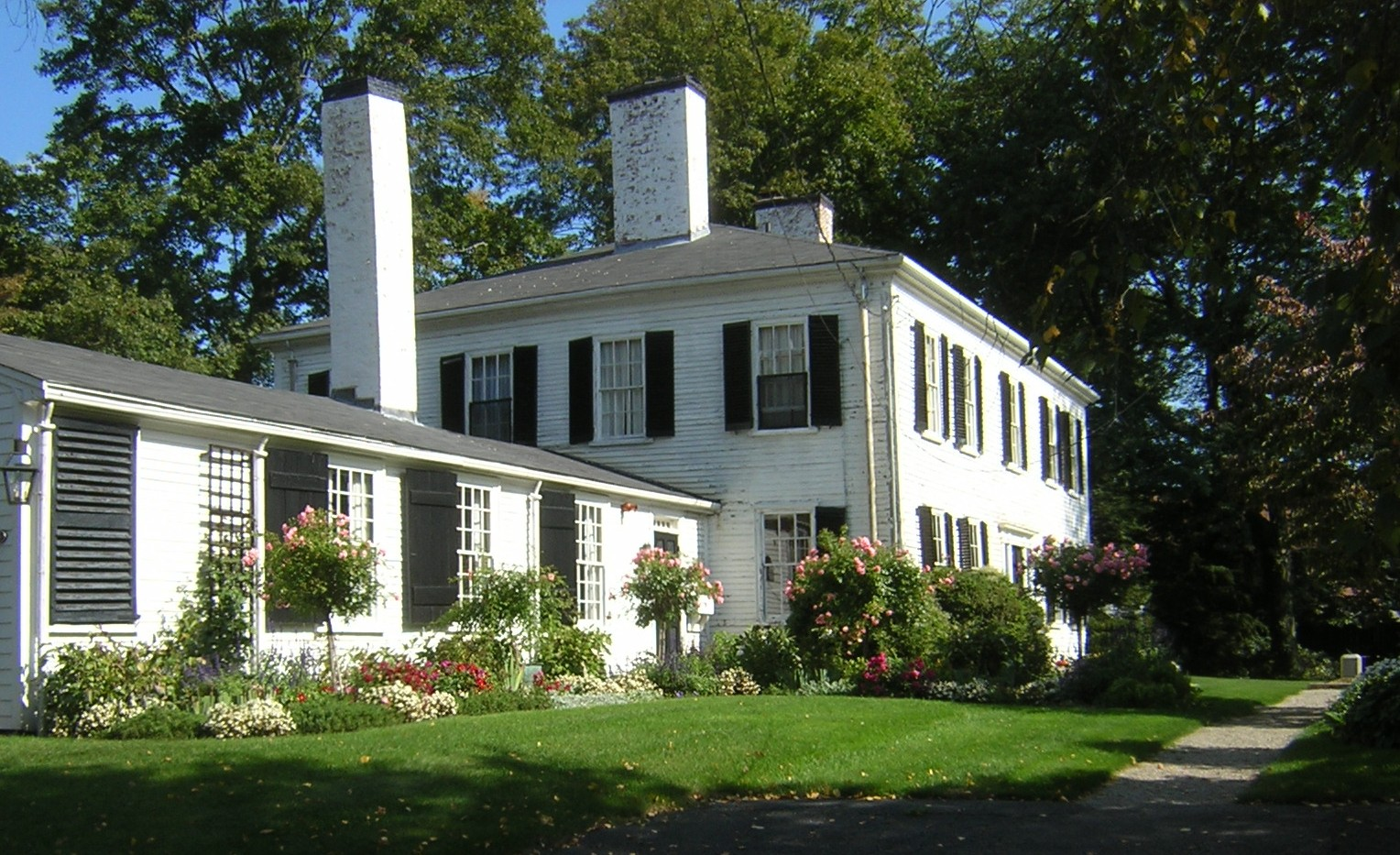

- Location within Massachusetts Location within the United States
- Location: 26 Governor Belcher Lane, Milton, Massachusetts
- Coordinates: 42°15′34″N 71°2′58″W
- Area: 0.5 acres (0.20 ha)
- Built: 1776
- Architectural style: Federal
- NRHP reference No.: 82002748
- Added to NRHP: April 01, 1982

The Belcher-Rowe House is a historic house at 26 Governor Belcher Lane in Milton, Massachusetts. Built in 1776-1777 by the widow and daughter-in-law of former colonial governor Jonathan Belcher, it is Milton's first known example of Federal style residential architecture. The house was listed on the National Register of Historic Places in 1982.

== Description and history ==
The Belcher-Rowe House stands in what is now a residential area of East Milton, on the east side of Governor Belcher Lane. Its main block is a two-story frame structure, with a hip roof and clapboarded exterior. Its north and south elevations are symmetrical, with central entries flanked by two bays of sash windows. The doorways are framed by sidelight windows and flat pilasters, with a Greek Revival cornice above. Greek Revival molding runs below the roof soffit. A single-story frame addition extends west from the main block.

The house was built in 1776-1777 on land that had been purchased in 1727 by Jonathan Belcher, who served as colonial governor 1730-1741. Belcher gave the old homestead on that property to his son Andrew at the time of his marriage to Elizabeth Teale, daughter of the elder Belcher's second wife Maria Louisa Emilia Teale. The old homestead burned in January 1776. Construction of this house (which preserves part of the foundation of the original homestead in its basement) was complicated by the outbreak of the American Revolutionary War, and was not completed until 1777. Elizabeth Belcher sold the house to merchant John Rowe in 1781, and it remained in the Rowe family until 1940. Notable among Rowe's descendants who lived here was Mary Phillips Webster, who performed important early research documenting the importance of the Suffolk Resolves.

== See also ==
- National Register of Historic Places listings in Milton, Massachusetts
