= Jonathan Belcher =

American merchant and politician (1682–1757)

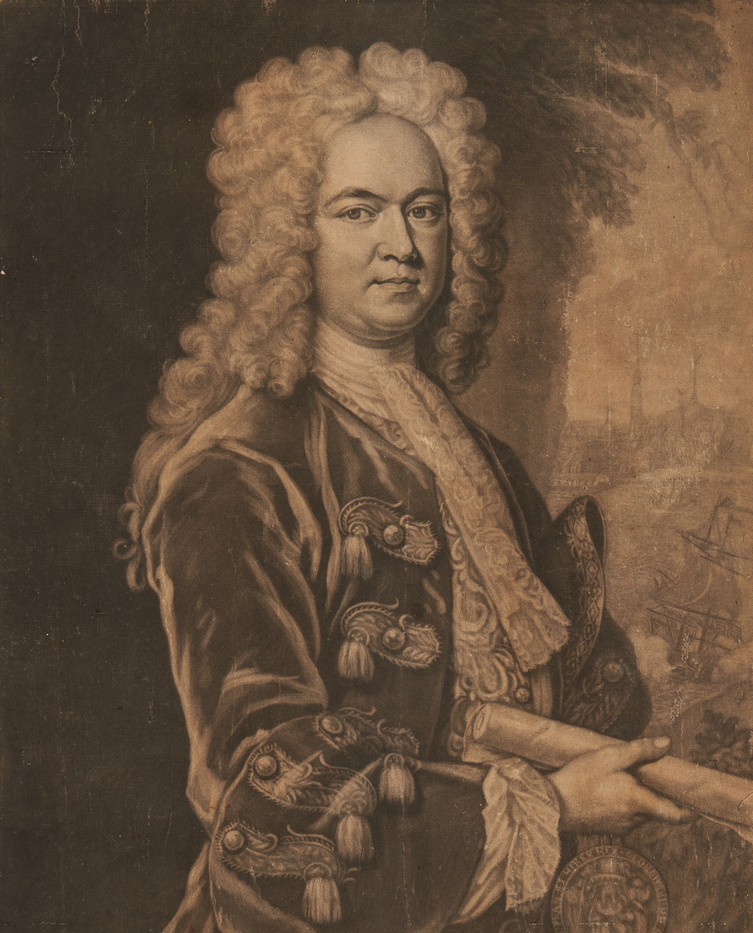
- Engraving by John Faber the Younger after a Richard Phillips portrait, c. 1734

Governor of Massachusetts
- In office 10 August 1730 – 7 September 1741
- Monarch: George II
- Lieutenant: William Tailer; Spencer Phips
- Preceded by: William Tailer (acting)
- Succeeded by: William Shirley

Governor of the Province of New Hampshire
- In office 1730–1741
- Monarch: George II
- Lieutenant: John Wentworth; David Dunbar
- Preceded by: John Wentworth (acting)
- Succeeded by: Benning Wentworth

Governor of the Province of New Jersey
- In office 1747 – 31 August 1757
- Monarch: George II
- Lieutenant: Thomas Pownall
- Preceded by: John Reading (acting)
- Succeeded by: John Reading (acting)

Personal details
- Born: 8 January 1682 Cambridge, Massachusetts Bay
- Died: 31 August 1757 (aged 75) Elizabethtown, New Jersey
- Resting place: Old Burying Ground, Cambridge, Massachusetts
- Spouse(s): Mary Partridge Belcher; Louise Teale Belcher
- Children: Jonathan Belcher; Andrew Belcher
- Education: Harvard University
- Profession: Merchant, politician, slave trader

Jonathan Belcher (8 January 1681/82 – 31 August 1757) was a merchant, politician, and slave trader from colonial Massachusetts who served as both governor of Massachusetts Bay and governor of New Hampshire from 1730 to 1741 and governor of New Jersey from 1747 to 1757.

Born into a wealthy Massachusetts merchant family (his father Andrew Belcher was a tavern owner in Cambridge, and his grandfather immigrated to Massachusetts Bay from England), Belcher attended Harvard College and then entered into the family business and local politics. He was instrumental in promoting Samuel Shute as governor of Massachusetts in 1715, and sat on the colony's council, but became disenchanted with Shute over time and eventually joined the populist faction of Elisha Cooke Jr.

After the sudden death of Governor William Burnet in 1729 Belcher successfully acquired the governorships of Massachusetts and New Hampshire. During his tenure, Belcher politically marginalized those who he perceived as opposition and made many powerful enemies in both provinces. In a long-running border dispute between Massachusetts and New Hampshire, Belcher sided with Massachusetts interests despite openly proclaiming neutrality in the matter. It was later discovered that he allowed illegal logging on Crown lands by political allies. His opponents, led by William Shirley and Samuel Waldo, eventually convinced the Board of Trade to replace Belcher (with Shirley in Massachusetts and Benning Wentworth in New Hampshire), and the border dispute was resolved in New Hampshire's favor.

Belcher was appointed governor of New Jersey in 1747 with support from its Quaker community. He unsuccessfully attempted to mediate the partisan conflicts between New Jersey's Quakers and wealthy landowners, and promoted the establishment of the College of New Jersey, now Princeton University. Through most of his tenure as royal governor, Belcher was ill with a progressive nervous disorder, and died in office in 1757. Belchertown, Massachusetts, is named for him.

== Early life ==
=== Youth and education ===
Jonathan Belcher was born in Cambridge, Massachusetts Bay, on 8 January 1681/82. The fifth of seven children, his father Andrew was a merchant who was also one of the first slave traders in colonial New England, and his mother, Sarah (Gilbert) Belcher, was the daughter of a politically well connected Connecticut merchant and Indian trader. His mother died when he was seven, and his father sent him to live with relatives in the country while he expanded his trading business.

Andrew Belcher was highly successful in trade, although some of it was in violation of the Navigation Acts, and some was supposedly conducted with pirates. However he made his money, he became one of the wealthiest men in Massachusetts in the 1680s and 1690s. To promote the family's status, he sent his son to the Boston Latin School in 1691, and then Harvard College in 1695, where Belcher was listed second (the order of listing being a rough indication of a family's importance) behind Jeremiah Dummer. Belcher and Dummer both went on to political careers in the province, sometimes as allies, but also as opponents. Belcher's five sisters all married into politically or economically prominent families, forging important connections that would further his career.

In January 1705/06 Belcher married Mary Partridge, the daughter of former New Hampshire Lieutenant Governor William Partridge, an occasional business partner of his father's. The couple had three children (Andrew, Sarah, and Jonathan) before she died in 1736. His brother-in-law through this marriage was the painter Nehemiah Partridge.

=== Agent for his father's commercial empire ===
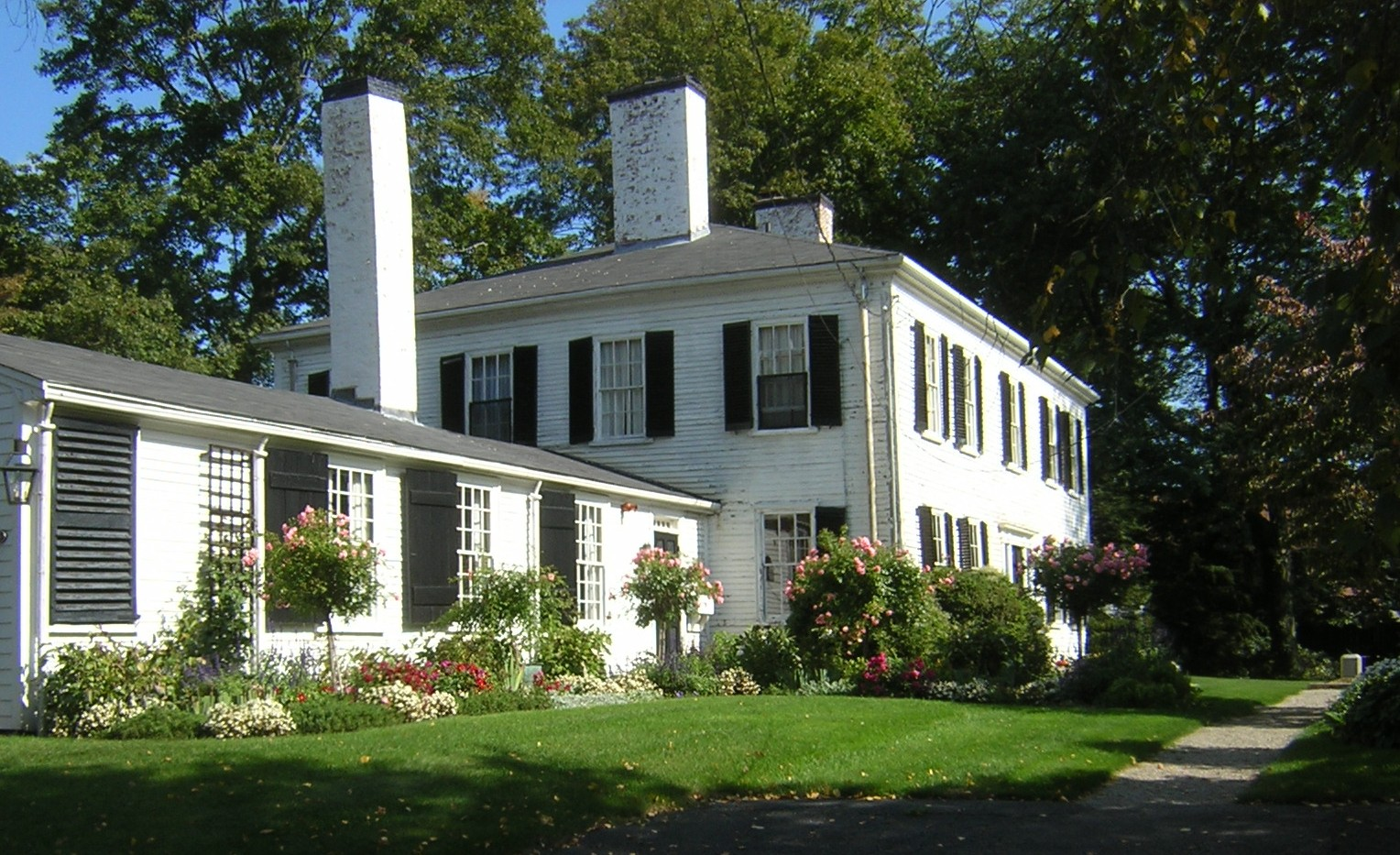
Belcher's summer home in Milton, Massachusetts, was destroyed by fire in 1776, but portions of it may have survived in its replacement, built by his widow.

Belcher graduated from Harvard at the age of 17, and then entered into his father's business. The trading empire his father built encompassed trade from the West Indies to Europe, and included shares or outright ownership of more than 15 ships. In the spring of 1704 Belcher's father sent him to London to cultivate business contacts of his own, and to secure military supply contracts.

After forging relations based on his father's letters of introduction in London, Belcher traveled to the Netherlands to do the same with Dutch merchants, and to begin a tour of western Europe. After seeing the sights of Rotterdam and Amsterdam he traveled to Hanover, where he was received by Electress Sophia and met the future King of Great Britain, George, Duke of Brunswick-Lüneburg. After calling on the Prussian court in Berlin, he returned to New England.

During these travels he was exposed to a variety of religious practices, but found regular comfort in Christian services most similar to the Calvinist-leaning New England Congregational Church. He eventually came to see himself as a defender of that faith practice, which permeated his political life.

During the years of the War of the Spanish Succession (whose North American theater is also known as Queen Anne's War), Belcher's father was retained as a major supplier to the colonial militia and served as the province's commissary general. Belcher was involved in the management of the family's trading activities. In 1708, he traveled again to London, where he secured a major contract with The Admiralty. Before returning to Massachusetts he once again traveled to Hanover, where he was well received at court. The war effort caused economic upheavals in Massachusetts, and the Belchers, who stockpiled grain and other supplies for military use, became a focus for popular discontent when food shortages arose late in the war. The family's warehouses were the targets of mob action, and Belcher was beaten by a mob on one occasion.

=== His own investments ===
Belcher's merchant interests included the occasional involvement in slave trading. He is known to have owned slaves as well, ordering them from his friend, Isaac Royall Sr. He presented an enslaved Indian to Electress Sophia on his second visit to Hanover in 1708. Despite this, he expressed a distaste for slavery, writing in 1739, "We have but few in these parts, and I wish there were less."

In addition to the mercantile trade, the Belcher family also had extensive land holdings in New England. Due to errors in early surveys of the line between Massachusetts and neighboring Connecticut, Massachusetts in the early 1700s gave lands in the central portion of the province to Connecticut as compensation for the survey errors, which were in its favor. When Connecticut auctioned off these "Equivalent Lands" in 1716, Belcher was one of the buyers. The lands he was allocated were eventually incorporated as Belchertown.

Belcher also inherited property from his father that was located in what is now Wallingford and Meriden, Connecticut. He spent a significant amount of money in an unsuccessful attempt to profitably mine the property for metal ores, particularly copper. In 1714 Belcher expanded his mining interests, acquiring a stake in a mine in Simsbury (now East Granby, Connecticut). In 1735 he reported having invested £15,000 in these ventures, which failed in part because under British law at the time it was illegal to smelt copper in the colonies, necessitating the costly shipment of ores to England. He eventually established a technically illegal smelting operation. (The Simsbury site, later used by the state as a prison, is now a National Historic Landmark.)

Upon the accession of King George I in 1714, Andrew Belcher sent Jonathan to London, seeking to capitalize on the existing connection to the new king. During this trip Belcher engaged in recruiting for his properties in Connecticut. In addition to hiring an experienced metal refiner in England, he also recruited German miners; the area near the Simsbury mine became known as "Hanover" as a consequence of their presence. (Belcher had previously toured mines in the Harz mountains on his first visit to the Hanover.)

== Agent and councilor ==
Colonel Elizeus Burges was commissioned as governor of Massachusetts and New Hampshire by the new king. Belcher, along with compatriot Jeremiah Dummer, representing opponents of a land bank proposal that Burges had promised to support, bribed him £1,000 to resign before he left England. Dummer and Belcher were then instrumental in promoting Samuel Shute as an alternative to Burges, believing among other things that he was likely to be well received in New England because he was from a prominent Dissenting family. They also coached Shute on the political situation in the province after he won the appointment. Shute arrived in Boston on 4 October 1716, where he began a difficult and contentious tenure in office. He signaled his partisanship by first taking up residence with Paul Dudley, son of the last-appointed governor Joseph Dudley and a land bank opponent, rather than Acting Governor William Tailer.

Belcher was elected to the Massachusetts Governor's Council in 1718. During Shute's tenure Belcher was seen as part of a political faction that generally supported the governor. He was consequently on and off the council several times, blocked by the efforts of populist leader Elisha Cooke Jr. This struggle continued after Shute left the province at the end of 1722 to prosecute his differences with the assembly with the Privy Council in London. Belcher, however, became increasingly unhappy that Paul Dudley wielded more influence than he did during the administration of William Dummer (who was Dudley's brother-in-law) that followed.

When William Burnet arrived in 1728 as governor, Belcher was unexpectedly elected moderator of Boston's town meeting in an election apparently engineered by Cooke. In Burnet's dispute with the assembly over his salary (which exceeded that of Shute in its acrimony and occupied most of Burnet's brief tenure), Cooke and Belcher made common cause over the issue. Belcher was elected by the assembly as an agent to London to explain the colonial position on the governor's salary, and Cooke helped raise the funds needed for the trip.

== Governor of Massachusetts and New Hampshire ==
In 1729, while Belcher was in London, news arrived that Governor Burnet had died quite suddenly. Belcher lobbied for and was awarded the job of governor of both Massachusetts and New Hampshire. This was accomplished in part by bypassing the Board of Trade and appealing directly to higher level ministers in the government, earning him the enmity of the powerful board secretary, Martin Bladen, who opposed his nomination.

In accepting the appointment he was effectively promising to argue in the colony in favor of the position he had been sent to London to argue against. During Belcher's long tenure (he served from 1730 to 1741, one of the longer tenures of a Massachusetts provincial governor) he would argue with the colonial politicians that he was acting in their interest, while also working to convince London colonial administrators he was implementing their policies. Historian William Pencak writes that as a consequence, "By trying to keep on good terms with the province and the administration he lost the respect of both."

=== Massachusetts ===
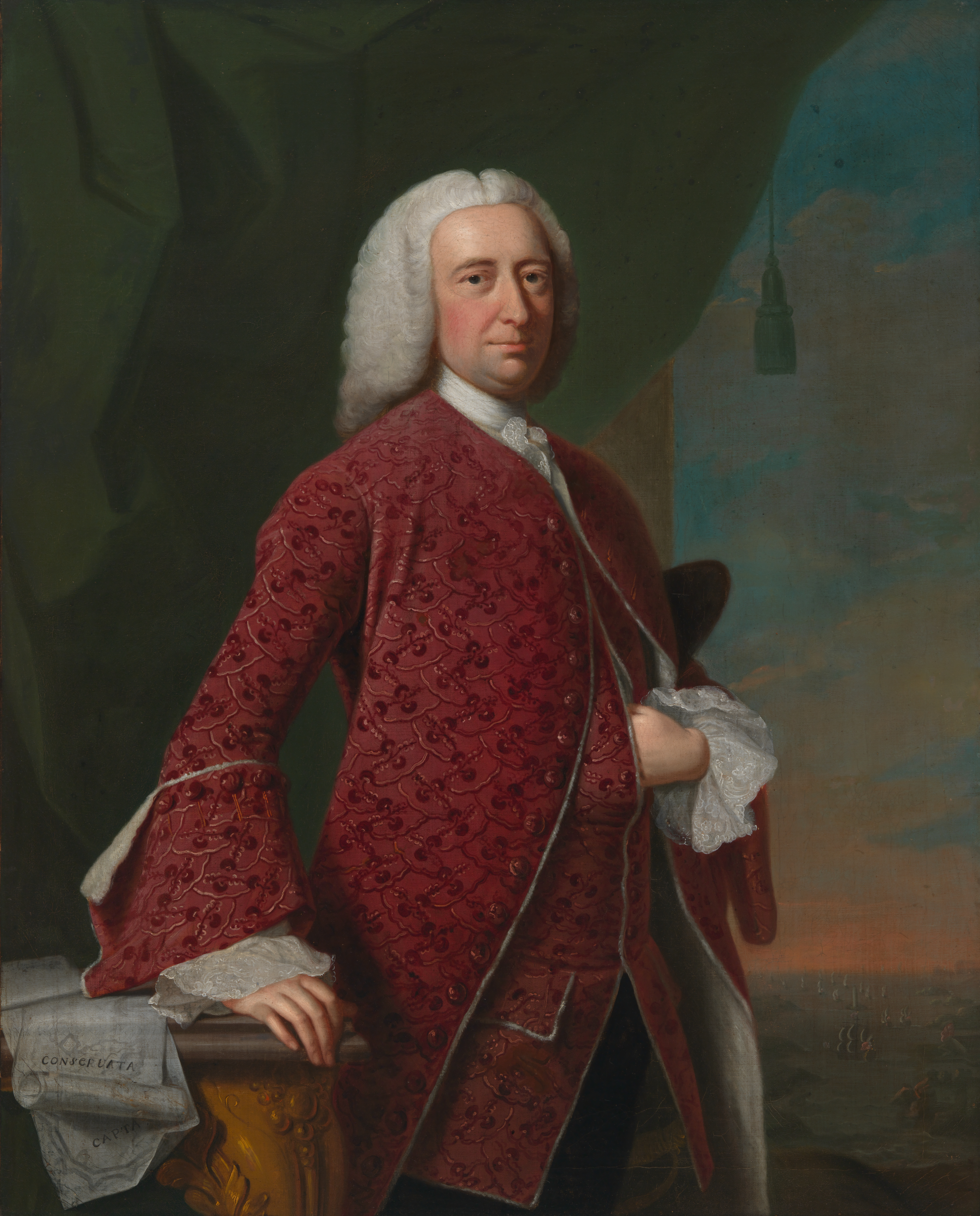
William Shirley, who obtained Belcher's removal from office in 1741

While he was in London Belcher arranged for Lieutenant Governor Dummer to be replaced by William Tailer (whose appointment to that post in 1715 he had ironically managed to supersede by lobbying for Dummer's appointment), and recommended that Jeremiah Dummer (with whom his relations had become seriously strained) be dismissed as colonial agent. He was well received in Massachusetts upon his arrival in 1731, but immediately began to purge opponents and their supporters from positions over which he had control. This immediately put all on notice that he would freely use patronage power as a political weapon.

One early issue Belcher took on was that of defending the established church. As an ardent Congregationalist (which was the establishment in Massachusetts) he perceived as dangerous the attempts of adherents of the Church of England in particular to gain exemptions from church taxes. He was willing to countenance such an exemption for the relatively modest number of Quakers, but refused to support one for the more numerous and politically connected Anglicans until it was apparent in 1735 that he would be instructed to do so. His support of the Quaker exemption brought him a potent support base in that community in London.

In 1735, Belcher presided over a meeting in Deerfield at which the Stockbridge Indians agreed to accept Congregationalist missionaries and authorized the erection of a mission house. (The Mission House, built c. 1742 pursuant to this agreement, still stands, and is a National Historic Landmark.)

Belcher also sought to improve business conditions in Boston. While on his tours of Europe he had opportunity to witness the comparatively orderly markets in Dutch cities; he used what he learned from those experiences to significantly reform the previously chaotic markets of Boston. (His positive feelings towards the Hanovers prompted him to name Boston's Hanover Street in their honor.)

=== New Hampshire ===
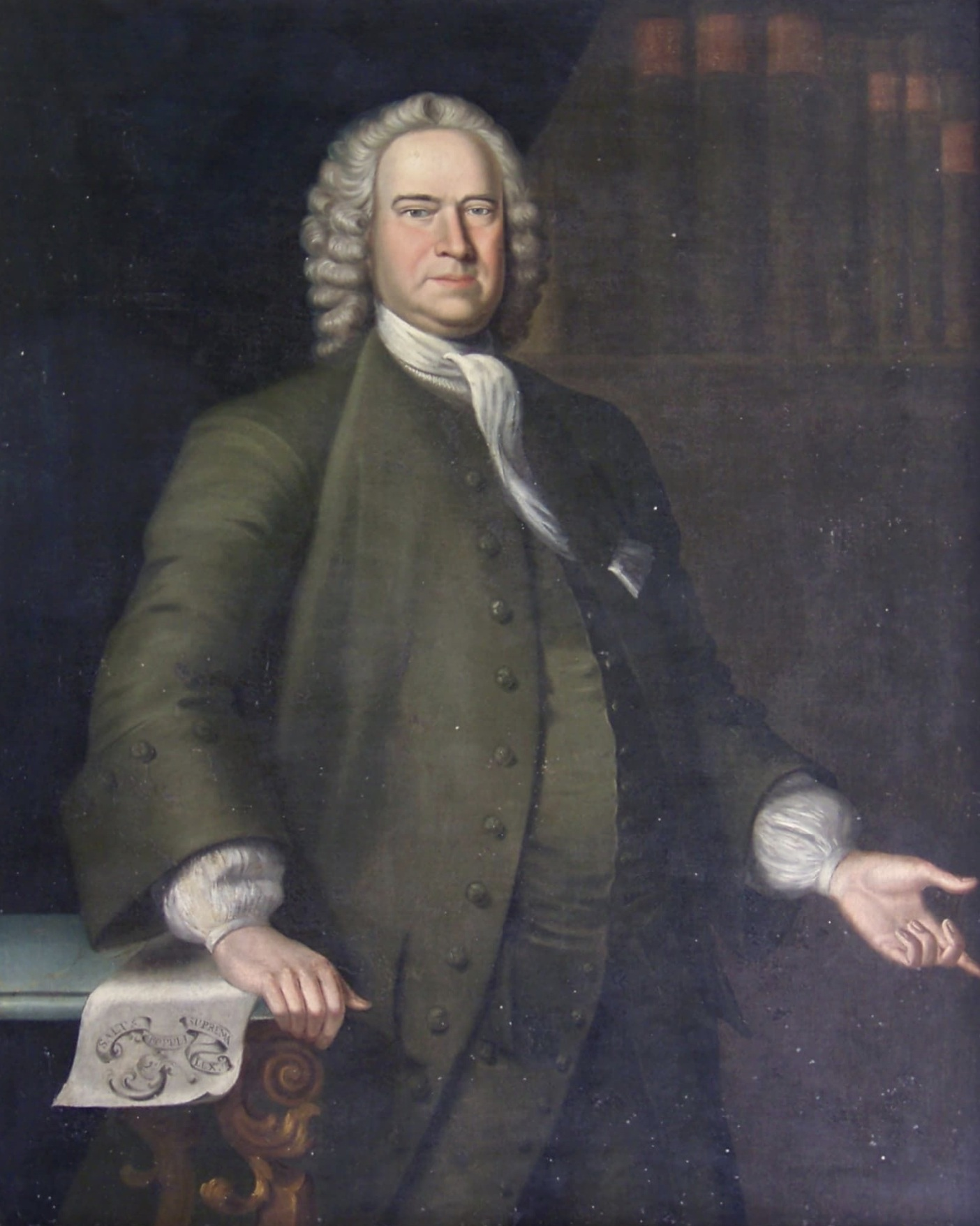
Richard Waldron, Belcher's right-hand man in New Hampshire's colonial government

Belcher's administration of New Hampshire started out friendly but rapidly turned sour. He learned that Lieutenant Governor John Wentworth had offered his support to Samuel Shute when the governorship became available, and consequently turned on the entire Wentworth clan in retaliation. He took on as an ally and confidant Richard Waldron, a bitter opponent of the Wentworths and a relative by marriage. As John Wentworth had, during his long tenure as lieutenant governor, established a large power base with both the province's land owners and merchants, this made him many powerful enemies. Biographer Michael Batinski theorizes that it was Waldron's influence that drove Belcher to strip many Wentworths and their allies from patronage positions.

The Wentworth power base was also generally unhappy that New Hampshire was tied to Massachusetts with the shared governorship, and many resented the fact that a Massachusetts man occupied the post. Because of their influence, New Hampshire's assembly was hostile to Belcher, and his opponents were able to convince the Board of Trade to appoint some of their number to the provincial council over his objections. Belcher made repeated unsuccessful attempts to get sympathetic assemblies, calling for elections ten times during his tenure. The intransigent legislatures refused to enact his legislative proposals.

Belcher was disheartened when David Dunbar was appointed lieutenant governor of New Hampshire after John Wentworth died in December 1730. Dunbar, who was friendly with the Wentworths, was also the king's surveyor, responsible for identifying trees suitable for use as ship masts and ensuring no illegal logging was taking place on ungranted lands in all of northern New England. This work was in opposition to a significant number of Belcher's supporters, who engaged in illegal logging on those lands, behavior explicitly countenanced by the governor. Belcher took all steps possible to ensure Dunbar could not exercise any significant powers, refusing to seat him on the council, and making frequent trips from Boston to Portsmouth to exercise his authority personally. The two men disliked one another, and Dunbar began moving supporters in London to lobby for Belcher's replacement not long after his appointment in 1731. The illegal logging activity by Belcher's allies eventually came to the attention of William Shirley, the crown advocate of the provincial admiralty court whose patron was the powerful Duke of Newcastle.

=== Boundary dispute ===
Belcher was unwilling to resolve longstanding boundary disputes between New Hampshire and Massachusetts. The disputed territory included areas west of the Merrimack River from its great bend near present-day Chelmsford, Massachusetts, to present-day Concord, New Hampshire. Competing grantees from the two provinces were by the 1730s engaging in increasingly tense legal action and petty violence against each other. Despite claims that he was neutral on the matter, Belcher orchestrated affairs to prefer the settlement of lands north and west of the Merrimack River by Massachusetts residents. The dispute eventually reached the highest levels of government and court in England. New Hampshire's advocates for separation from Massachusetts found an able spokesman in John Thomlinson, a London merchant with logging interests, who in 1737 convinced the Board of Trade to establish a commission on the boundary issue. Despite Belcher's attempts to orchestrate legislative proceedings to the advantage of Massachusetts (for example, allowing the New Hampshire assembly only one day to prepare a case on the dispute while that of Massachusetts had several months), the final ruling on the boundary, issued in 1739, went significantly in New Hampshire's favor.

=== United opposition ===
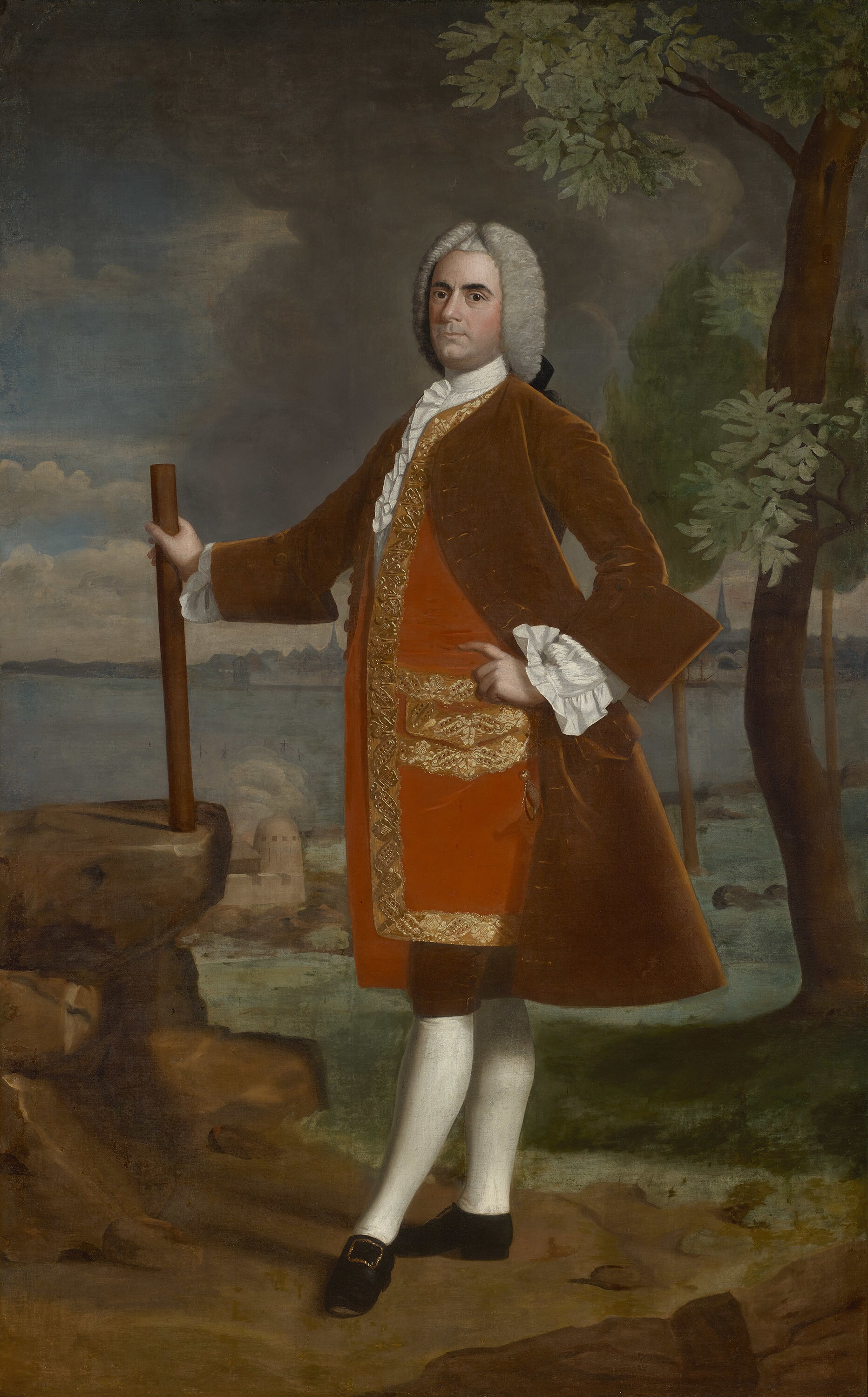
Samuel Waldo, who opposed Belcher's support for illegal logging on Crown lands

By 1736 representatives of Belcher's many political enemies began to coalesce into a unified opposition in London. William Shirley, who sought a more lucrative position, sent his wife to London to lobby on his behalf, making common cause with Samuel Waldo, a wealthy lumber baron whose supply contracts with the Royal Navy were harmed by Belcher's support of illegal logging. David Dunbar resigned as lieutenant governor in 1737 and went to London, where he provided documentation of the logging practices. These forces united with Thomlinson in an effort to orchestrate the replacement of Belcher, preferably with Shirley in Massachusetts and Benning Wentworth in New Hampshire.

Matters became more complicated in 1739 due to London politics and a currency crisis in Massachusetts. Belcher had been ordered to effect the retirement of a large amount of Massachusetts paper currency by 1741, and the legislation to accomplish this was rejected by the Board of Trade, leading to the introduction of competing banking proposals in the province. One faction dominated by landowners proposed a land bank, while merchants proposed a bank that would issue silver-backed paper. The proposals polarized the Massachusetts political establishment, and Belcher was unable to take sides for fear of alienating supporters on either side. He instead sought without success to browbeat the assembly into passing a currency retirement scheme acceptable to London. In 1740 elections land bank supporters swept into office, and the bank began issuing notes. Merchant interests opposed to the land bank began widespread lobbying in London for Parliamentary relief (which came in 1741, when it passed legislation extending the 1720 Bubble Act, which disallowed unchartered companies, to the colonies) likely abetted by John Thomlinson.

While this crisis brewed in Massachusetts, the ascendant Duke of Newcastle successfully pressured Prime Minister Robert Walpole to declare war on Spain in 1739. Part of the war strategy involved the raising of provincial forces to assist in operations against Spanish holdings in the West Indies. Belcher, who was expected to raise about 400 men, promised to raise 1,000, but was only able to raise about 500 in Massachusetts, and not even the 100 he had promised from New Hampshire. This was due in part on the reluctance of the extra companies to travel to the Caribbean without assurances of pay and supply. Belcher also, in pursuit of the financial agenda, vetoed bills to issue currency with which to fund the militia that were raised.

The exact reasons for Belcher's dismissal have been a recurring subject of scholarly interest, due to the many colonial, imperial, and political factors at play. Two principal themes within these analyses are Belcher's acquisition of many local enemies, and the idea that good imperial governance in London eventually required his replacement. Before the issues of 1739 most of the efforts to unseat Belcher had failed: Belcher himself noted that year that "the warr I am ingag'd in is carrying on in much the same manner as for 9 years past." Historian Stephen Foster further notes that someone as powerful as Newcastle was at the time generally had much weightier issues to deal with than arbitrating colonial politics. In this instance, however, imperial and colonial considerations coincided over the need for Massachusetts to provide a significant number of troops for Newcastle's proposed West Indies expedition. In April 1740 Newcastle in effect offered Shirley the opportunity to prove, in the light of Belcher's political difficulties, that he could more effectively raise troops than the governor could. Shirley consequently engaged in recruiting, principally outside Massachusetts (where Belcher had refused his offers of assistance, understanding what was going on), and deluged Newcastle with documentation of his successes while Belcher was preoccupied with the banking crisis. Newcastle handed the issue off to Martin Bladen, secretary to the Board of Trade and a known Belcher opponent. The Board of Trade then apparently decided, based on the weight of the evidence, that Belcher needed to be replaced. In April 1741 the Privy Council approved William Shirley's commission as governor of Massachusetts, and Benning Wentworth's commission as governor of New Hampshire was issued the following June.

== Governor of New Jersey ==
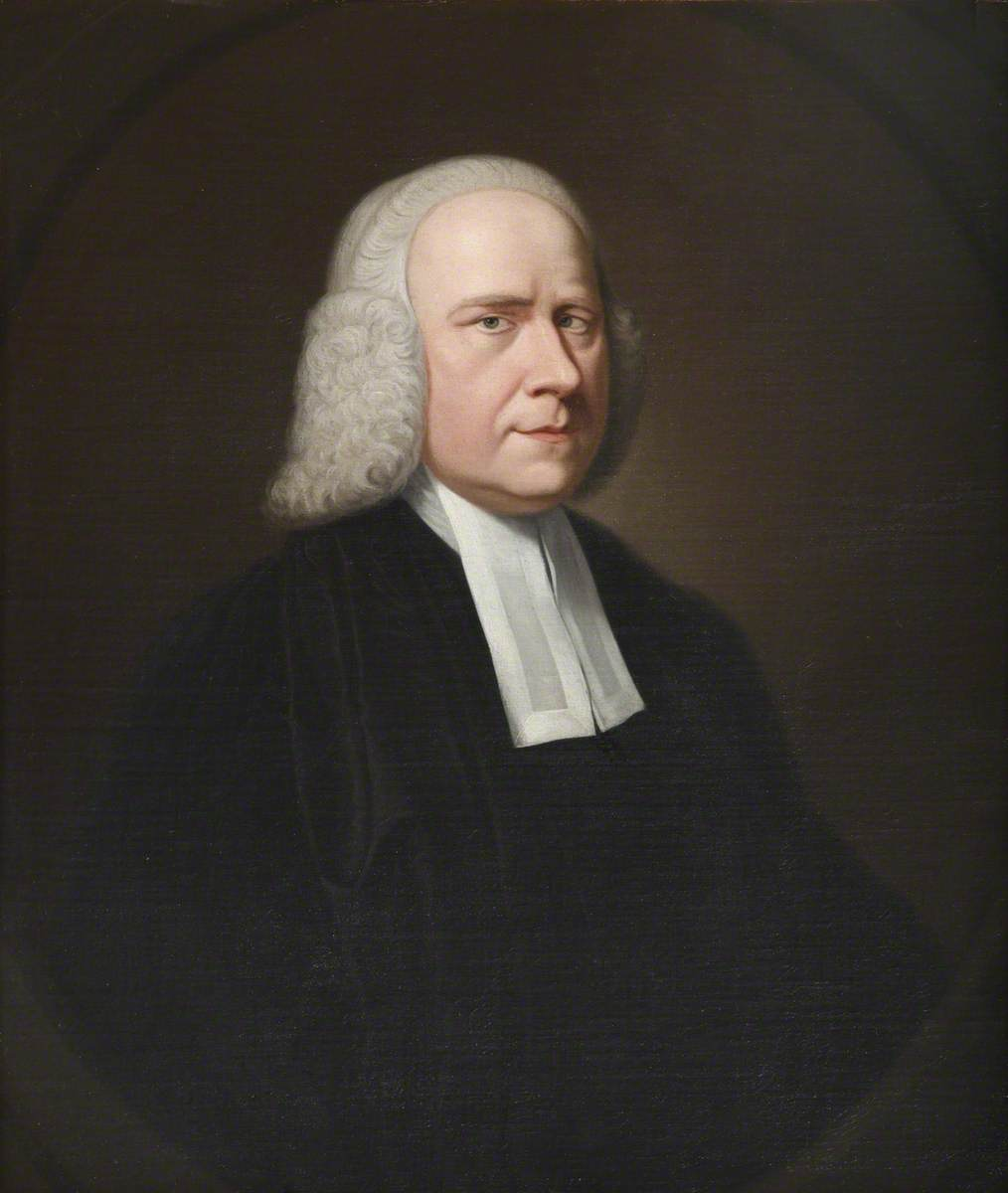
Belcher became influenced by the theology and preaching of several evangelical clergymen, including George Whitefield (pictured here), who were affiliated with the Great Awakening.

The fact that he had been supplanted by Shirley came as a surprise to Belcher. He had expected to lose the New Hampshire governorship, but was shocked when news of Shirley's commissioning arrived. Following Shirley's inauguration Belcher retired to his Milton estate. Seemingly restless and in some financial need, he expressed weak interest in the possibility of holding another colonial appointment, and in 1743 traveled to England, stopping in Dublin to visit his son Jonathan Jr. When he arrived in London he joined the social circles of the Congregationalist and Quaker communities (the latter including among its influential members his brother-in-law Richard Partridge), and called on colonial administrators in the hopes of acquiring a new posting. There he remained for three years, until in 1746 word arrived that the governor of New Jersey, Lewis Morris, had died. Since New Jersey had a strong Quaker political establishment, Belcher immediately began mobilizing supporters in the London Quaker community to assist in securing the post. Due to this alacrity he was able to get the posting before agents for Morris' son Robert Hunter Morris had time to organize their effort.

He served as governor of New Jersey from 1747 until his death in 1757. About a year after his arrival in Burlington (then the provincial capital), he married (for the second time) Louise Teale, a widow he met in London, in September 1748. The political situation he arrive in was highly acrimonious, and there had been riots in the previous year over widespread disagreements on land titles between land owners, who controlled the provincial council, and farmers and tenants, who controlled the assembly. Most legislation had been stalled since 1744 due to the inability of assembly, council, and governor to resolve differences on these issues. Governor Morris' high-handed actions in support of the proprietors had united previously divided populist factions against him and the council. The province was also a rural patchwork of different cultures and religions, unlike predominantly English and Congregationalist New England. Elizabethtown, near New York, was heavily populated by evangelical Christians, among them Reverend Aaron Burr, and Belcher found himself welcome there. He regularly attended services there, and was particularly influenced by preachers including George Whitefield and Jonathan Edwards, leaders of the Great Awakening with whom he corresponded.

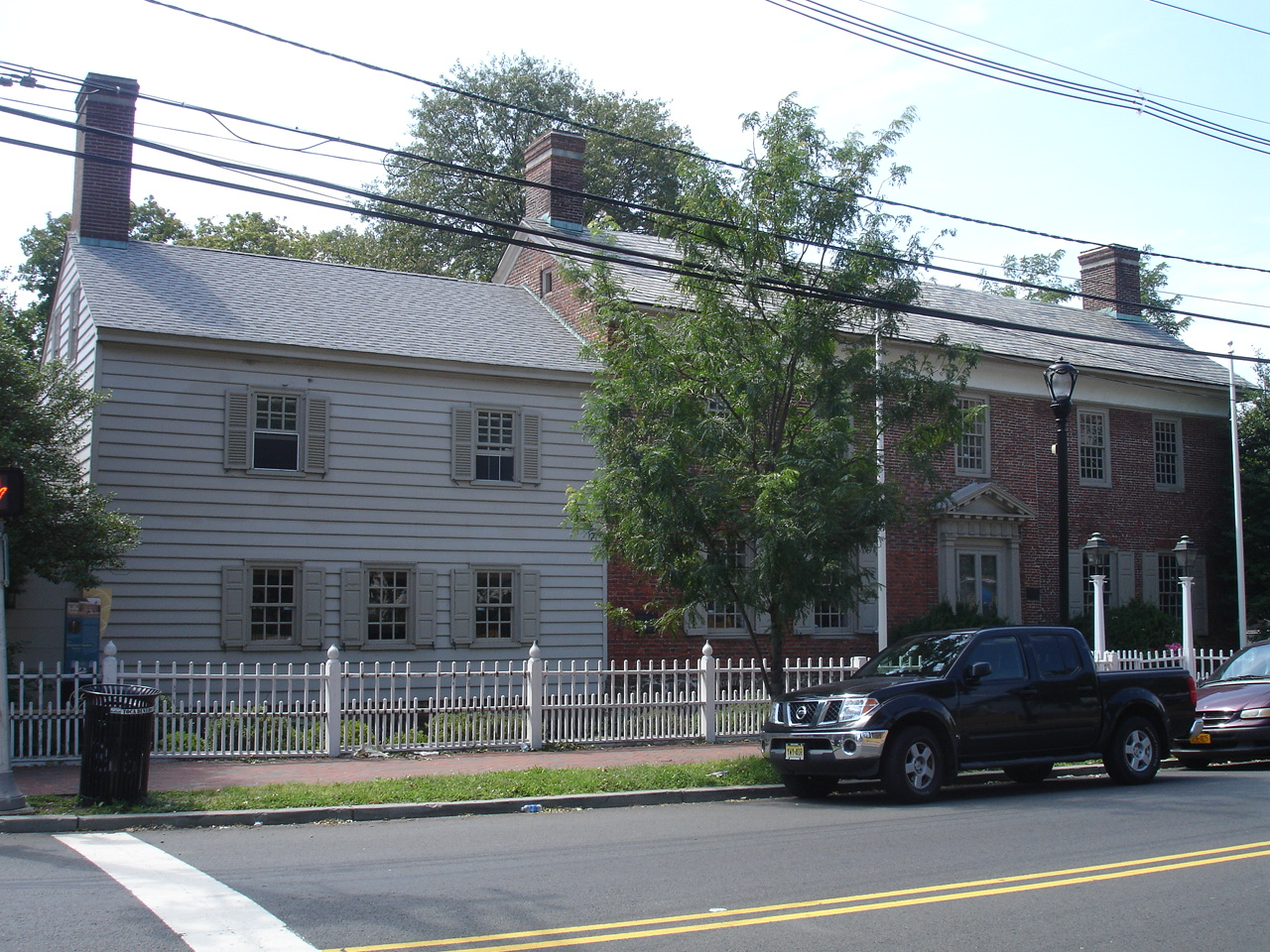
Listed on the National Register of Historic Places, the Belcher-Ogden House in Elizabeth, New Jersey, was the residence of the governor in the former provincial capital, then called Elizabethtown.

Although Belcher's arrival prompted some goodwill, resulting in the passage of bills to fund the government and deal with ongoing counterfeiting of the colonial paper currency, divisions soon resurface along the same sectional lines. Belcher believed that the land issues should be resolved by negotiation between the parties, and sought to maintain a position as a neutral arbiter of the dispute. Because he had been propelled into the office by antiproprietary interests, he refused to unconditionally support the council in moves to advance proprietary interests, but also received little support from the assembly. Because the assembly and council divided over the issue of how to tax undeveloped lands (which the proprietors owned in large amounts), the government was short of funds between 1748 and 1751.

One controversial matter that Belcher was able to finesse was the establishment of the College of New Jersey (now known as Princeton University). The college was proposed by New Jersey's evangelical Presbyterians, with whom Belcher found religious agreement. However, Quaker leaders and the proprietors had expressed great reservations about the Presbyterians' drive to gain a charter for the school (on the grounds that it would be used as a vehicle for converting their children), and Governor Morris had refused to grant one. After his death, council president John Hamilton, acting prior to Belcher's appointment, granted the charter. The college's opponents pressured Belcher to withdraw the charter; he instead adopted the college as a cause to support, and expanded its board to include a diversity of religious views. When its first building was constructed in 1754, the college's board wanted to name it after Belcher, but he demurred, preferring it to be named in honor of King William, who hailed from the Dutch House of Orange-Nassau. As a result, the building (which still stands) is known as Nassau Hall. He also supported the establishment of the college's library, to which he bequeathed his personal library. In 1748, Belcher issued a second Charter to the College of New Jersey, since the validity of the initial charter, which was granted in 1746 by Acting Governor Jonathan Dickinson, came under question.

The legislature remained divided until after the French and Indian War broke out in 1754, when the demands for support of military action brought some unity. The assembly objected to increased funding of the militia in 1755 because Belcher refused to authorize the emission of additional paper currency. It later acceded to demands for increased security, but was reluctant to support militia for action outside the province's boundaries. Legislators also complained that its meetings were too frequently held at Elizabethtown, primarily because of Belcher's poor health.

For much of his New Jersey administration Belcher was ill, suffering from a type of progressive paralytic disorder. In the summer of 1751 he moved from Burlington to Elizabethtown in the hopes that his health would improve; it did not. Eventually his hands became paralyzed, and his wife was employed to write for him. He died at his home in Elizabethtown on 31 August 1757; His body was transported to Massachusetts, where he was buried at Cambridge.

== Personal ==
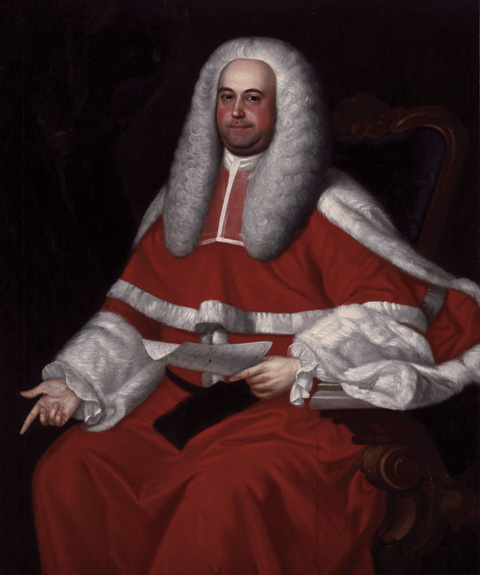
Belcher's son Jonathan, portrait by John Singleton Copley

Belcher's youngest son Jonathan was appointed as Chief Justice of the Nova Scotia Supreme Court and as Lieutenant Governor of Nova Scotia. His other son, Andrew, continued in the family business (although not to his father's exacting standards), and also served on the Massachusetts Governor's Council. Belcher had no children with his second wife Louise, although he did prevail on his son Andrew to marry her daughter from her first marriage. Belcher was also the uncle of future Massachusetts Lieutenant Governor Andrew Oliver and Massachusetts Superior Court of Judicature Chief Justice Peter Oliver, and was the great-grandfather of British Admiral Edward Belcher.

Belcher had a reputation for exhibiting an abrasive personality—something that was said by contemporaries to heighten divisions in New Jersey. Historian Robert Zemsky wrote of Belcher, "[He] was almost a caricature of a New England Yankee: arrogant, vindictive, often impetuous despite a most solemn belief in rational action and calculated maneuver." Once he acquired the governorship, he took potential assaults on his power personally, and reacted vindictively in attempts to destroy or marginalize his enemies. In personal correspondence with friends, family, and supporters, he used condescending names to refer to his opponents, and he applied pressure to the press in Boston to ensure reasonably favorable coverage of him.

== Legacy ==
Belchertown, Massachusetts, is named for him. His home in Elizabethtown survives, and is listed on the National Register of Historic Places as the Belcher-Ogden House. It is also a contributing property to the Belcher-Ogden Mansion-Price, Benjamin-Price-Brittan Houses District. Belcher's summer home in Milton, Massachusetts, was destroyed by fire in 1776, but portions of it may have survived in its replacement, built by his widow and now known as the Belcher-Rowe House, also listed on the National Register. (The Jonathan Belcher House in Randolph, Massachusetts, is named in recognition of someone from a different time and lineage in the Belcher family genealogy.) Governor Belcher is twice mentioned in Nathaniel Hawthorne's "Old Esther Dudley," one of the stories that make up "Legends of the Province House," a quartet of tales that first appeared in 1838–39.

== Burial ==
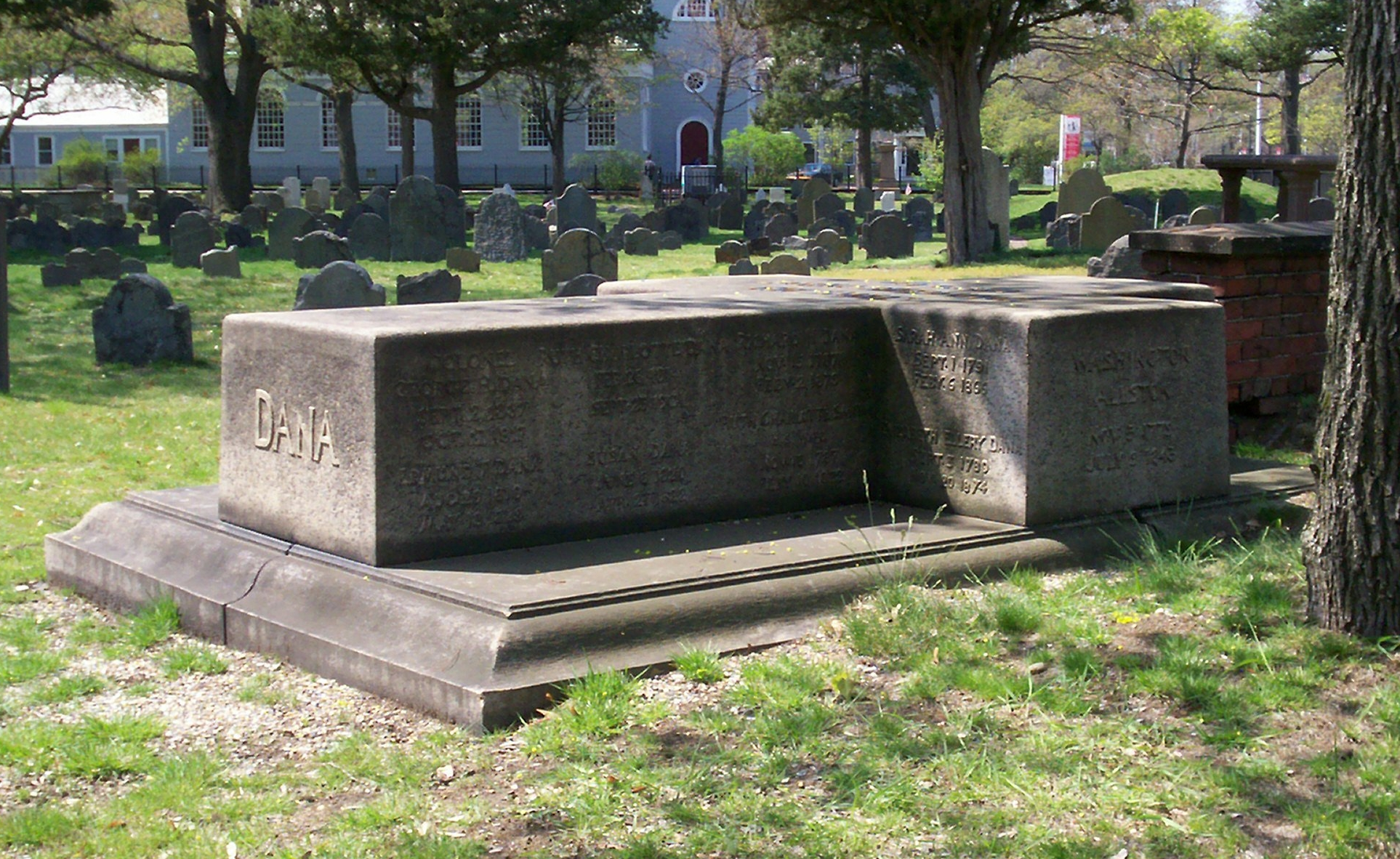
Gov. Jonathan Belcher's grave is near the Dana family plot in the Old Burying Ground, Cambridge, Ma.

At his death Governor Belcher left instructions that he be buried with his ardent friend and cousin, Judge Jonathan Remington (1677–1745; father-in-law of William Ellery, a signer of the Declaration of Independence). The body of Judge Jonathan Remington was disinterred and placed by his side. The monument which the governor had directed to be raised over his resting-place was never erected. The tomb became the family vault of Jennisons (Gov. Belcher's granddaughter married Dr. Timothy Lindall Jennison). The site of their grave was forgotten and long search has been made for it. In the late 1800s, local historians found that Gov. Jonathan Belcher and Judge Jonathan Remington were buried in one grave in Old Burying Ground, Cambridge, Massachusetts. Their tomb is contiguous to that of Judge Edmund Trowbridge and Edmund Trowbridge Dana. In that of Judge Trowbridge rest the remains of Washington Allston; of Chief Justice Francis Dana; of the poet Richard Henry Dana and others of the family.

== Notes ==
Government offices
Preceded by William Tailer (acting)	Governor of the Province of Massachusetts Bay; 10 August 1730 – 14 August 1741	Succeeded by William Shirley
Preceded by John Wentworth (acting)	Governor of the Province of New Hampshire; 11 December 1729 – 12 December 1741	Succeeded by Benning Wentworth
Preceded by John Reading (acting)	Governor of the Province of New Jersey; 1747–1757	Succeeded by John Reading (acting)
