= William Partridge (New Hampshire official) =

American colonial administrator

William Partridge (1654 – January 3, 1729) was an administrator in Colonial New England.

Born in Newbury, Massachusetts Bay Colony, he moved to the Province of New Hampshire, where he served as treasurer and magistrate before being appointed lieutenant governor (1697–1702). He and his wife, Mary (Brown) Partridge, had at least two children: painter Nehemiah Partridge and Mary Partridge Belcher, the first wife of colonial Governor Jonathan Belcher.
