= Mary Fisher (missionary) =

Early Quaker minister

Mary Fisher, also Mary Fisher Bayley Crosse, (c. 1623–1698) was among the first travelling Quaker ministers. She counts as one of the Valiant Sixty, the group of early itinerant preachers whose mission was to spread the spiritual message of the founder of the Quakers, George Fox.

== Early life ==
Mary Fisher was born in Yorkshire, possibly at Pontefract, England. As a young woman she worked as a housemaid for Richard and Elizabeth Tomlinson at Selby, where in late December 1651 she heard the ministry to the Tomlinson family and servants given by George Fox. His message and fellowship resonated profoundly with her and as a result she became an active Quaker.

== Ministry and persecution ==
In 1652, as a Quaker "Publisher of Truth", Mary Fisher publicly rebuked the vicar of Selby church in an address to his congregation after worship. She was imprisoned in York Castle and later that year, she was confined there again with Elizabeth Hooton and four other Quakers, who joined in a pamphlet, False Prophets and False Teachers Described (1652), urging people to leave the state church and draw on the Inner Light. In 1653 and 1654 she was further imprisoned in York for offences against the church in Pontefract.

In December 1653, accompanied by Elizabeth Williams, Fisher walked to Cambridge as part of a Quaker drive to proselytise the south of England. There they rebuked the student theologians at Sidney Sussex College, as their Quaker aversion to organised religion extended to the colleges where ministers were trained. By order of the Mayor, they were taken to the market cross under the pretext that they were vagabonds, stripped to the waist and became the first Quakers to be publicly flogged for their ministry. In 1655, Fisher was again imprisoned for rebuking the priest of Newport Pagnell in Buckinghamshire.

== Mission to the New World ==
In 1655, Fisher and another Quaker preacher, Ann Austin, voyaged to the New World to spread the Quaker message there. They were subsidised in their mission by Quaker funds. They first sailed to Barbados in the Caribbean, where they were well received and where they converted the lieutenant governor of the island to Quakerism.

On 11 July 1656 they became the first Quakers to visit the English North American colonies, arriving at Boston in the Massachusetts Bay Colony on the Swallow. There they met with fierce hostility from the Puritan population and the Deputy Governor of the colony, Richard Bellingham, as news of the ostensibly heretical views of the Quakers had preceded them.

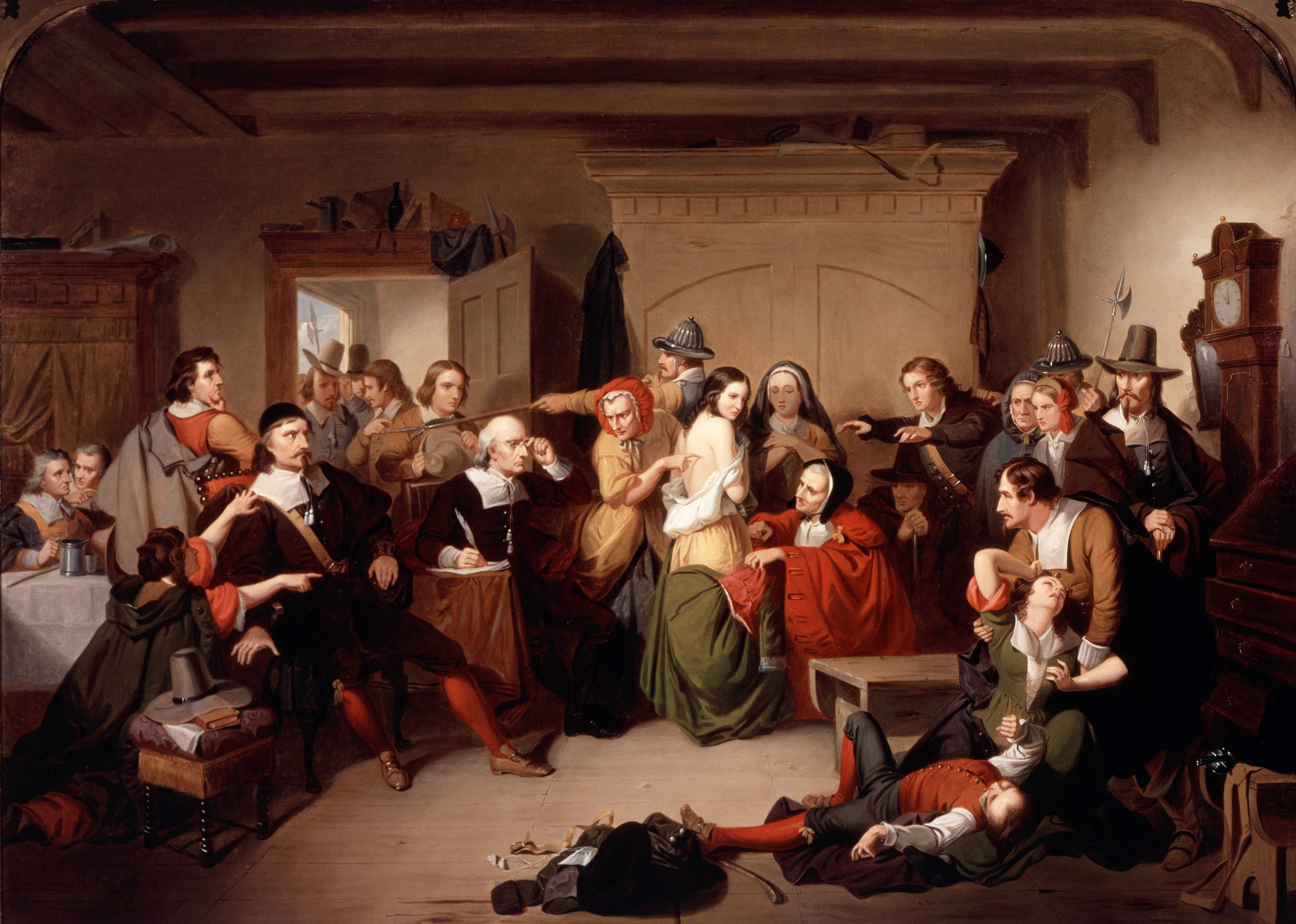
The examination as depicted in a 1853 painting by T. H. Matteson

On arrival, they were taken ashore, imprisoned, forced to undress in public, and their bodies intimately examined for signs of witchcraft, Ann Austin reporting that one of the female searchers was "a man in a womans [sic] apparel". Their books and pamphlets were seized and burned by the Boston hangman. An innkeeper, Nicholas Upsall, offered to pay their fines if he were permitted to speak with them in prison. The magistrates, having ordered the women's prison window to be boarded up so as to isolate them, refused Upsall's request, the intention being to starve them to death. Upsall then bribed their warder by paying him five shillings a week to allow him to bring food to the women, and so saved their lives. Fisher and Austin were deported back to Barbados on the Swallow after five weeks' imprisonment, having been unable to share their faith with anyone except Upsall, who became the first North American Puritan convert to Quakerism.

Fisher and Austin returned to England in 1657.

== Mission to the Ottoman Empire ==
In 1658 Fisher travelled in a group of six Quakers to the Mediterranean and to visit the Ottoman Empire to expound her Quaker faith to the Sultan Mehmed IV. When their ship reached Smyrna, she asked the English Consul there how to contact the Sultan. He told her this would be unwise, and tricked the party into boarding a ship bound for Venice. Realising this when at sea, Fisher asked the captain to land her on the Morean coast of Greece. She then travelled alone on foot across Macedonia and Thrace until she reached the Sultan, who was encamped with his army at Adrianople. There she persuaded Köprülü Mehmed Pasha, the Grand Vizier, to arrange an audience for her with the Sultan, describing herself as an ambassador of "The Most High God". According to her account, the Sultan received her ministry "testifying to the Universal Light" attentively. She then declined his offer of an armed escort and made her way alone to Constantinople and then back to England. Her experience in a Muslim country compared to her experiences in Christian countries left a deep impression. She wrote:

Now returned into England... have I borne my testimony for the Lord before the king unto whom I was sent, and he was very noble unto me and so were all that were about him... they do dread the name of God, many of them... There is a royal seed amongst them which in time God will raise. They are more near Truth than many nations; there is a love begot in me towards them which is endless, but this is my hope concerning them, that he who hath raised me to love them more than many others will also raise his seed in them unto which my love is. Nevertheless, though they be called Turks, the seed of them is near unto God, and their kindness hath in some measure been shown towards his servants.

== Later life ==
In 1662 Mary Fisher married William Bayley of Poole, Dorset, a seafarer and Quaker preacher and writer who had been converted to Quakerism by George Fox in 1655. He died on a sea voyage from Barbados in 1675. She then married John Crosse at Southwark on 19 September 1678, with whom she and three children from her first marriage moved to Charleston, South Carolina. John Crosse died there in 1687, as his wife Mary herself did sometime between August and November 1698. Her remains were buried in the Quaker burial ground there, which was removed in 1967. The property she left on her death included a black slave. Some of her remains were relocated within the site, but most were removed to Court House Square, Charleston.

== See also ==
- The Examination of a Witch
