= Nicholas Upsall =

English colonist in North America (c. 1596–1666)

- Born: c. 1596; England
- Died: August 20, 1666, age 70; Dorchester, Massachusetts Bay Colony
- Occupations: innkeeper, landowner
- Known for: Saved the lives of Mary Fisher and Ann Austin; First Puritan to become a Quaker; Helped establish first monthly meetings of Quakers in North America
- Spouse: Dorothy Capen
- Children: Amasa, Elizabeth, Susannah, and Experience

Nicholas Upsall (c. 1596 – 20 August 1666) was an early Puritan settler in the English Massachusetts Bay Colony, among the first 108 Freemen in early colonial America. He was a trusted public servant who after 26 years as a Puritan, befriended persecuted Quakers and shortly afterwards joined the movement. He was banished from Massachusetts at 60 years of age and helped to found the first monthly meeting of Friends in colonial America, at Sandwich, Massachusetts Bay Colony.

== Arrival in the colonies ==
From their first arrival aboard the Mayflower in 1620, until 1629, only about 300 Puritans had survived in New England, scattered in small and isolated settlements. In 1630, their population was increased when the ship Mary and John arrived in New England carrying 140 passengers from the English West Country counties of Dorset, Somerset, Devon and Cornwall. These included Nicholas Upsall, Roger Ludlowe, John Mason, Samuel Maverick, William Phelps, Henry Wolcott and other men who would become prominent in the founding of a new nation.

It was the first of the ships later called the Winthrop Fleet to land in Massachusetts. Nicholas married Dorothy Capen (1611–1675). They had fours daughters: Amasa, born December 1635; a daughter Elizabeth born December 1637 who married William Greenough on July 4, 1651; a daughter Susannah born July 12, 1639, who married Joseph Cooke on November 10, 1659; and Experience born January 19, 1640, who died August 2, 1659.

== Became Freeman and led community ==
The earliest record of Nicholas Upsall was on September 28, 1630, when he was impanelled on a jury by the Court of Assistants to look into the death of Austen Bratcher. He applied for Freeman at the first General Court held in the Colonies on October 19, 1630, and took the Oath of Freemen among 108 others on May 18, 1631. Upsall was an upstanding Puritan and citizen for more than a quarter of a century. He was among the first to become a Freemen, possessing full citizenship as a result, and gained public trust, respect and esteem. He later found that his prior role in the community did not protect him against religious persecution.

Upsall was granted land in Dorchester in 1633 and became its first bailiff and ratter in 1634. "It is ordered by the town of Dorchester," April 17, 1635, "that Nicholas Upsall and Matthew Grant shall p'ceed in the measuring of the great lotts as they have begun."

Upsall was licensed as an innkeeper from 1636-1638. "It is ordered," according to the town records of June 27, 1636, "that Nicholas Upsall shall keep a house of entertainment for strangers." He was selectman in 1638 and 1642. In 1637 he was a member of the jury of Life and Death, as it was called, to distinguish it from the grand jury.

Upsall apparently maintained an independent mind on political and religious matters, and was seen as man of "sober, and of unblameable conversation." His stature in the community is also evidenced in a letter from Roger Williams to John Winthrop, dated Providence, April 16, 1638. Williams requested Winthrop to send his reply to Upsall in Dorchester, "because it is not safe for his messenger to wait for the answer." This was three years after Williams's banishment.

The same year Upsall became an original and the twenty-third charter member of the Ancient and Honorable Artillery Company of Boston, the oldest military company in America, which serves today as Honor Guard to the Governor of Massachusetts who is also its Commander in Chief.

In 1644 Upsall and his family moved to Boston, and with his wife Dorothy was admitted to the church there on May 28. He was already a large property holder there, for in 1637 "he owned the land from the north-east side of Richmond Street and from Hanover Street to the sea." He was also an inn-keeper of the Red Lyon Inn on the northeast corner of North and Richmond Streets.

== Met and joined Quakers ==
In 1656, Mary Fisher and Ann Austin became the first known Quakers to set foot in the New World. They journeyed from England to Barbados and eventually arrived at the Massachusetts Bay Colony. Their goal was to spread the beliefs of the Friends among the colonists.

John Endecott.

In Puritan-run Massachusetts, which was extremely antagonistic towards dissenting viewpoints, the women were harshly persecuted. They were imprisoned, stripped to the waist and publicly whipped, and their books and materials were burned. The magistrates were set on starving the women and burying them. An unknown individual, likely Upsall, offered to pay their fine if he could be allowed to speak with them. The magistrates, having boarded up their jail window to isolate them, refused. Upsall, "touched with compassion," gave their guard five shillings a week to permit him to bring food to the women. The women were deported back to Barbados after five weeks, having been unable to share their faith with anyone except perhaps Upsall.

Upsall's act of kindness apparently escaped detection. But his contact with the women and their steadfast faith apparently moved him. On October 14, 1656, the Magistrates caused that a law prohibiting any citizen from aiding the Quakers was read in public. The act was apparently read before the door of his inn, and he is recorded as having raised his voice in protest. He later wrote, "...that he did look at it as a sad fore-runner of some heavy judgment to fall on the country." On the following morning he was called before the Court and charged with having expressed his disapprobation of the law against Quakers.

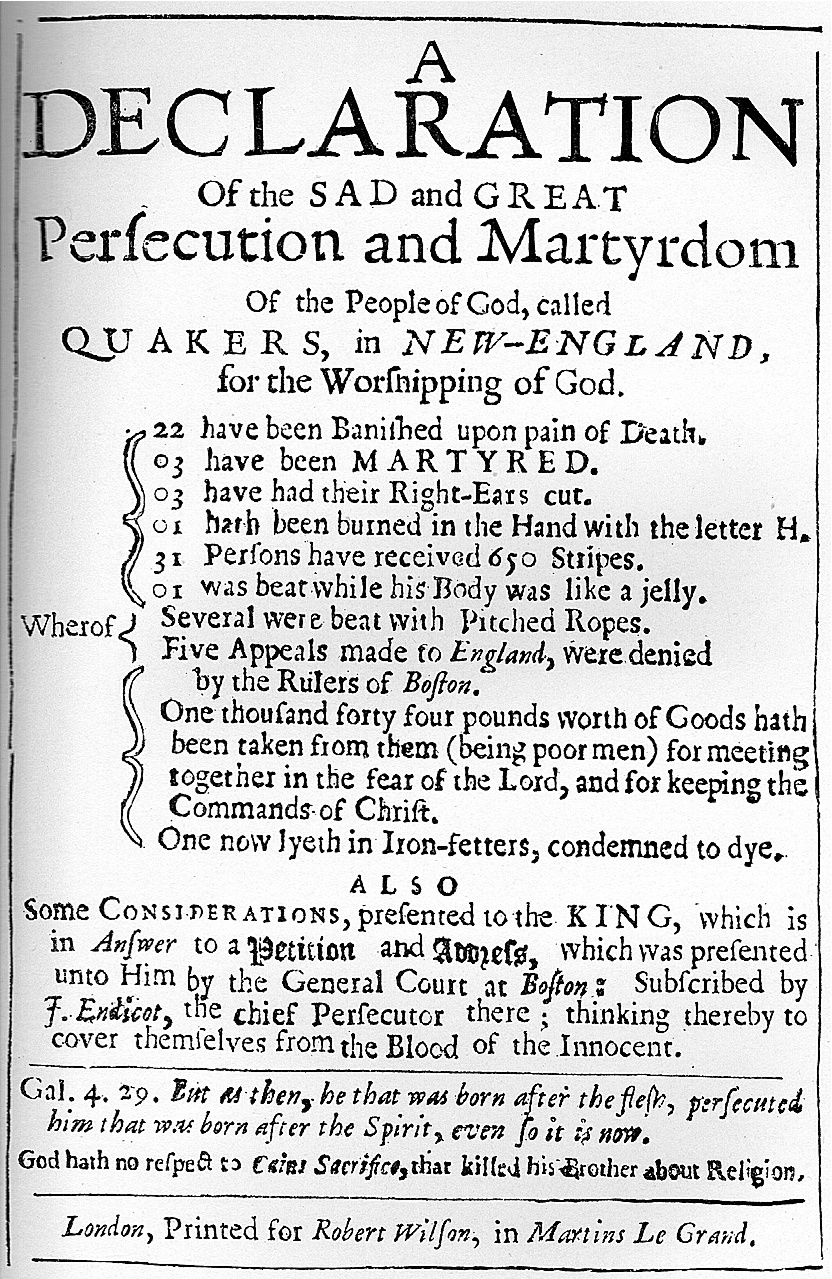
Title page from a book protesting the persecution of Quakers in New England (1660-1661)

A fine of twenty pounds was exacted from him, Governor Endecott saying, "I will not bate him [i.e., reduce his fine] one Groat." He was besides banished to depart in thirty days, including four in prison, and was fined three pounds more for not attending worship after banishment. At 60 years of age, Upsall abandoned the Puritan Church, giving up the rights and privileges accorded to him as a Freeman, and joined the Friends. He was banished as a result and took refuge during the winter of 1656 in Sandwich, Massachusetts. There he helped to found the first Monthly Meeting of Friends in the United States. It began meeting in 1657 at the home of William and Priscilla Allen. Other founding Quakers included Richard Kerbey, Elizabeth Newland, and Stephen and Daniel Wing.

He made friends among the Indians, and one of the chiefs called him "friend," and offered to build him a comfortable house, if he could accept his hospitality. The chief commented about Upsall's persecutors: "What a God have the English who deal so with one another over the worship of their God."

On October 19, 1658, the Puritans passed a law stating that any Quaker who refused banishment would face "pain of death." Upsall eventually left Sandwich for Rhode Island, though he returned to Boston after three years, when he was imprisoned for two years.

When the "Boston martyrs", Quakers Marmaduke Stephenson and William Robinson, were executed, their bodies were dumped in into a pit dug nearby without a marker. Upsall, from his prison, asked to be permitted to build a fence around their burial site, but his request was denied. From prison, he still attracted people to his beliefs, and he was then sent to the Castle in Boston harbor for another year. During 1660-1664, "twenty-two [individuals] had been banished on pain of death, three martyred, three had their right ear cut off, one had been burned in the hand with a letter H, three had been ordered by the court to be sent to Barbadoes as slaves, thirty-one persons had received six hundred and fifty stripes administered with extreme cruelty, £1044 of property had been taken from them, and another was martyred in 1661.

His wife petitioned twice on his behalf, and when King Charles II ordered Governor Endecott to release all Quakers, Upsall along with many others was finally released. The court record recounts, "Nicholas Vpshall being formerly sentenced to perpetual Imprisonment, & obteyning a Reprivall, hath greatly abused their lenity, do therefore Order him to be Confined again to ye house of John Capen." "Reprivall" [i.e., a "reprieve"] still meant banishment, and his transfer to his brother-in-law John Capen's home stipulated that he may remain free, "provided he does not corrupt any with his pernicious opinions," or does not teach "the diabolical doctrines and horrid tenets of the cursed sect of Quakers." He died there in August 1666 and was buried in Copp's Hill Burying Ground.

== Death and legacy ==
On October 13, 1666, Nicholas' estate after payment of his debts was valued at £543, 10s, a large estate for his times, especially given that for the last ten years of his life he lived in exile for having become a Quaker. His will specifically includes the Quakers:

Item: I do order and give for the use of the such servants of the Lord as are commonly called Quakers, my new feather bed, bolster and pillows, with a good pair of-sheets and a pair of blankets, with the new rugg, and bedstead fitted with rope, Matt and Curtains, in that little room in my house, "the Red Lyon Inn," called the parlor or in the chamber over that parlor, during the life of my said wife, and after her decease to be then continued by my daughter [Susannah] Cook, within whose line that part of the house falleth.

Item. I give to the said Society of Quakers my chest, with all my books and papers therein lying, with a small table in the room...

Provided and my will is, if my executrix or my daughter Cook shall see meet to set a house on any part of my land for the use of the Quakers, that then it shall be built 24 feet in length and 18 feet wide, with a chimney and said bed, bedstead and table shall be for their company; and it shall stand with my will.

Historians believe the furniture he bequeathed to the Friends were in the Red Lyon Inn, which he owned at the time of his death.

In 1694, Edward Shippen, the first mayor of Philadelphia under the city charter, gave a piece of land for a Friends Meeting House. On Brattle Street, near the site of the Quincy House, the Friends recorded that the "money from Nicholas Upsall's Chamber to go towards it." The records of the Yearly Meeting of Friends for New England, dated April 7, 1694, contain the following:

Whereas Nicholas Upsall of Boston did formerly bequeath unto us, the people of God, in scorn called Quakers, a chamber and furniture in Boston; but not having received the benefit of it, we do now give power and order our friends Edward Shippen and Edward Wanton to agree and sell the aforesaid privileges and right in the same for such sum of money as they shall agree for; and such discharge in their names shall be a sufficient discharge in the behalf of the rest of the body of Friends called Quakers.

== See also ==
- Quakers in North America
