= Nehemiah Partridge =

American painter (1683–c.1730s)

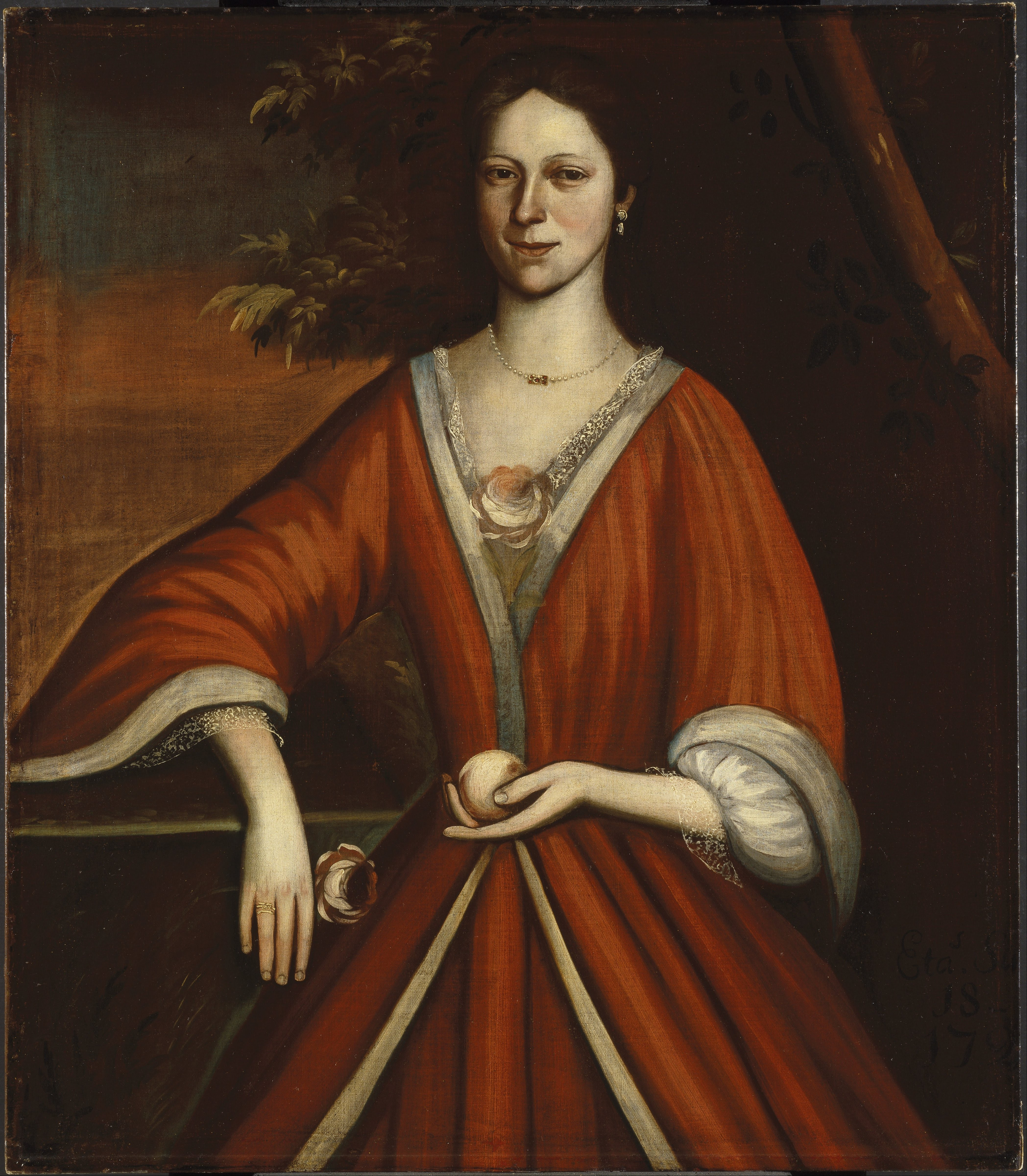
Wyntje (Lavinia Van Vechten), 1720, oil on canvas, in the collection of the Brooklyn Museum

Nehemiah Partridge (March 9, 1683 – between 1729 and 1737) was an American painter. He is believed to be the same artist as those identified as the Schuyler Limner and the Aetatis Suae Limner, though this identification has been called into question by some historians.

== Life and career ==
Partridge was born in Portsmouth, New Hampshire, the son of William Partridge and Mary (Brown) Partridge; his father rose from being a carpenter and merchant to become the colony's lieutenant governor from 1696 to 1703, while, in 1705, his sister married Jonathan Belcher, who himself would later become colonial governor. Partridge is known to have been active in Boston as a japanner from 1712 until 1714, during which time he also sold paints; at this time he lived very close to the decorative painter Thomas Child. Advertisements in the local press suggest that he began his painting career at this time, though no works by his hand from the period are known to survive. He was in New York City by 1718, as in that year he was made a freeman of the city, his profession being recorded as limner; in the same year he was recorded as master to an apprentice, James Smith. As with Boston, no paintings are known to survive from this stage of his career, either.

Sometime around 1718 Partridge was introduced into the society of Albany, New York, which had not yet been visited by any painters, and close to fifty portraits of local notables have been attributed to him. How he came to know his patrons is unknown, but it may have been through Boston merchant Jacob Wendell, whose relative Evert was among the more important citizens of the city. Partridge counted among his subjects three future mayors, Robert Livingston the Elder, and Pieter Schuyler; his portrait of the latter, a full-length, is among the earliest such in the colonies. He left Albany in 1721, trying his fortunes in Newport, Rhode Island and Jamestown and Williamsburg, Virginia and leaving behind a trail of portraits before returning to Albany in 1724. The last year he is known to have been active anywhere is 1725; he then returned to Boston, where he died.

Partridge was almost certainly alive in 1729, the year of his father's death. He married sometime before 1732, his wife being Mary Halsey, granddaughter of mathematician James Halsey. He was dead by 1737, when his mother referred in her will to pieces of silver which she left to children of her "late son Nehemiah".

=== Identification ===
Partridge's name was remembered after his death, but for many years it was believed that none of his paintings had survived. This changed with the discovery by art historian Mary Black, in the account book of Everett Wendell, of an agreement with Partridge dated May 13, 1718, to trade a horse for ten pounds and four portraits. As a result of this identification, over eighty portraits and one scriptural painting were assigned to Partridge's hand; nearly all are from the Albany area. The discovery was significant for two reasons; it enabled the development of a large body of work for a painter who had previously been known only for his decorative work, and provided another link between painting in the upper Hudson Valley and art in Boston.

== Work ==
Certain stylistic hallmarks make Partridge's work easy to distinguish from that of his contemporaries. Chief among them is the fact that nearly all of his paintings are inscribed with the phrase "Aetatis suae" or some variant thereof, followed by the sitter's age and the date of completion of the painting; it was this peculiarity that led to the artist's christening as the "Aetatis Suae Limner", while the epithet "Schuyler Limner" came from the same painter's association with the Schuyler family. Partridge's palette, too, was distinctive, tending towards brown, blue, black, and rust. The figures in his portraits are stiffly formal, typical of many of the untrained American artists following in the footsteps of Godfrey Kneller; many of his paintings derive their compositions from English mezzotints of the era, a practice also typical of many of his contemporaries. Two portraits by the "Schuyler Limner" are owned by the National Gallery of Art, which claims that the creator may not be identical to Partridge; many others are included in the collection of the Albany Institute of History and Art.
