= Ann Austin =

English Quaker missionary

Ann Austin (n.d. – 1665) was one of the first Quaker travelling preachers. She and Mary Fisher became the first Quakers to visit the English North American colonies.

== Mission to the New World ==
Austin was a resident of London and the mother of five children when she left England with Mary Fisher to take the Quaker message of George Fox to the New World. She may well have then been in her sixties as she was described at the time as being 'stricken in years'.

They were subsidised in their mission by Quaker charitable funds and first sailed to Barbados in the Caribbean where they were well received and where they converted the Lieutenant Governor of the island to Quakerism. On 11 July 1656, they became the first Quakers to visit the English North American colonies, arriving at Boston in the Massachusetts Bay Colony on the Swallow. There they met with fierce hostility from the Puritan population and the Deputy Governor of the colony, Richard Bellingham, as news of the heretical views of the Quakers had preceded them.

On arrival, they were taken ashore and imprisoned. They were forced to undress in public, and their bodies were intimately examined for signs of witchcraft, Ann reporting that one of the female searchers was a man in a womans [sic] apparel. Their books and pamphlets were seized and burned by the Boston hangman. An innkeeper, Nicholas Upsall, offered to pay their fines if he were permitted to speak with them in prison but the magistrates, having ordered their prison window to be boarded up so as to isolate them refused his request, the intention being to starve them to death. Upsall then bribed their warder by paying him five shillings a week to allow him to bring food to the women and so saved their lives. Fisher and Austin were deported back to Barbados on the Swallow after five weeks' imprisonment, having been unable to share their faith with anyone except Upsall, who became the first North American Puritan convert to Quakerism.

Fisher and Austin returned to England in 1657. The Boston council declared on 11 July 1656, the day of their arrival that:

"there are several laws long since made and published in this jurisdiction bearing testimony against heretics and erroneous persons," and that Ann Austin and Mary Fisher, "upon examination are found not only to be transgressors of the former laws, but to hold very dangerous, heretical, and blasphemous opinions; and they do also acknowledge that they came here purposely to propagate their said errors and heresies, bringing with them and spreading here sundry books, wherein are contained most corrupt, heretical, and blasphemous doctrines contrary to the truth of the gospel here professed amongst us."

On her return from Boston, Ann Austin's ministry continued until her death in prison during the Great Plague of London in 1665. She was buried in the Quaker Burying Ground, Bunhill Fields, London's first Quaker burial ground. It has also been speculated that Austin may have settled, as did Mary Fisher, among the Quakers of South Carolina in the 1680s.

== See also ==
- Quakers in North America
