= Quakers in North America =

Religious demographic

Quakers (or Friends) are members of a Christian religious movement that started in England as a form of Protestantism in the 17th century. It has spread throughout Africa, North America, Central America, and Australia. Some Quakers originally came to North America to spread their beliefs to the British colonists there, while others came to escape the persecution they experienced in Europe. The first known Quakers in North America arrived in the Massachusetts Bay Colony in 1656 via Barbados, and were soon joined by other Quaker preachers who converted many colonists to Quakerism. Many Quakers settled in the Colony of Rhode Island and Providence Plantations, due to its policy of religious freedom, as well as the British colony of Pennsylvania which was formed by William Penn in 1681 as a haven for persecuted Quakers.

== The arrival of the Quakers ==
Mary Fisher and Ann Austin are the first known Quakers to set foot in the New World. They traveled from England to Barbados in 1655 and then went on to the Massachusetts Bay Colony to spread the beliefs of the Friends among the colonists.

In Puritan-run Massachusetts the two women were persecuted, imprisoned, banished and their books were burned. Only one man, Nicholas Upsall, was kind to them during their imprisonment. Nicholas became a Friend himself and began spreading Friends' beliefs in Massachusetts. Due to the intolerance of the Puritans, the Quakers eventually left the Massachusetts bay colonies and migrated to the more tolerant colonies in Rhode Island.

== The first Monthly Meeting ==
Nicholas Upsall was banished from Boston and took refuge in the town of Sandwich, Massachusetts. It was there that he helped to establish the first Monthly Meeting of Friends in the United States. This was held in 1657 at the home of William and Priscilla Allen. Besides the Allens and Upsall, those in attendance included Richard Kerley and Elizabeth Newland.

== Quakers in New Jersey and Pennsylvania ==
The first Friends who settled along the Delaware River were John Fenwick, Edward Wade, John Wade, and Richard Noble; they formed a settlement at Salem, New Jersey, in 1675.

In 1681, King Charles II allowed William Penn, a Quaker, a charter for the area that was to become Pennsylvania. Penn guaranteed the settlers of his colony freedom of religion. He advertised the policy across Europe so that Quakers and other religious dissidents would know that they could live there safely. On November 10, 1681, Robert Wade established the first Monthly Meeting in the colony, which eventually became the Chester Monthly Meeting.

== Quakers and abolitionism ==
During their first decades in America, many Quakers owned slaves. However, as time went on Quakers were at the center of the movement to abolish slavery as early as 1688. Pennsylvania, center of American Quakerism, was the first state to abolish slavery. In the antebellum period, "Quaker meeting houses [in Philadelphia] ...had sheltered abolitionists for generations."

== Branches of Quakerism in North America ==
Quakers in North America are diverse in their beliefs and practices. Friends there have split into various groups because of disagreements throughout the years.

Conservative Friends are a small group that emphasize both the Inward Light and the Bible as sources of inspiration and guidance. They practice unprogrammed worship. Many of them adhere to the traditional standards of "plainness" in speech and dress (see Testimony of Simplicity). Their meetings are not part of any larger groups. They are found primarily in Iowa, Ohio, and North Carolina.

Pastoral Friends emphasize the Bible as a source of inspiration and guidance. They practice programmed (i.e., planned) worship led by ordained clergy. Most pastoral Friends groups are part of the Friends United Meeting. They conduct both service projects and evangelism, and are found primarily in Indiana, North Carolina, Iowa, and Ohio.

Evangelical Friends strongly emphasize the Bible as a source of inspiration and guidance, considering it the ultimate authority for faith and practice. They practice planned worship led by ordained clergy. Their congregations are often called churches instead of meetings, and they are usually part of Evangelical Friends International. They are very active in evangelism and missionary outreach as well as service projects. They are found throughout the United States and Latin America but are concentrated in Guatemala, Panama, Ohio, California, Oregon, and Kansas.

Liberal Friends emphasize the Inner Light as a source of inspiration and guidance. They practice unprogrammed (i.e., spontaneous, Spirit-led) worship, and have no ordained clergy. Among them are both Christians and universalists. Many liberal Friends groups are part of the Friends General Conference. Some of them are part of both the Friends General Conference and the Friends United Meeting; others are independent or not affiliated with any larger group. They are very involved in service projects but not in evangelism. They are widespread throughout Canada and the United States but are concentrated in Pennsylvania, New York, and New Jersey.

== See also ==
- Quakers in Latin America
