= Jonathan Belcher (jurist) =

Canadian politician

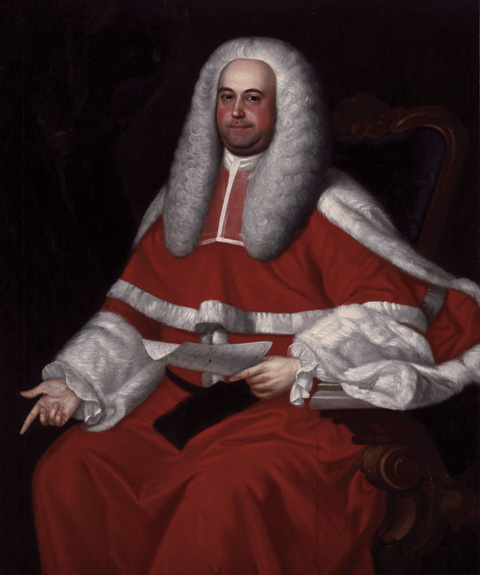
- Portrait by John Singleton Copley, 1757

Lieutenant Governor of Nova Scotia
- In office 1760–1763
- Monarch: George III
- Preceded by: Charles Lawrence
- Succeeded by: Montague Wilmot

Chief Justice of the Nova Scotia Supreme Court
- In office 1754–1776
- Succeeded by: Charles Morris

Personal details
- Born: July 23, 1710 Boston, Province of Massachusetts Bay
- Died: March 30, 1776 (aged 65) Halifax, Nova Scotia
- Relations: Jonathan Belcher, father Andrew Belcher, brother
- Children: 7, including Andrew Belcher

Jonathan Belcher (July 23, 1710 – March 30, 1776) was a British-American lawyer, chief justice, and acting Governor of Nova Scotia during the period of 1760-63 when Henry Ellis was in office as Governor but did not fulfil his duties.

== Biography ==
Born in Boston, Province of Massachusetts Bay, the second son of Jonathan Belcher and Mary Partridge, Belcher entered Harvard College, where in 1728 he received a Bachelor of Arts degree. In 1731 he proceeded to Master of Arts, also at Harvard. In 1730, he entered the Middle Temple, London, to read law, and in 1734 was called to the English bar. In the meantime he had been admitted as a fellow-commoner to Trinity College, Cambridge, where in 1733 he received another master's degree in mathematics. He later received a third master's degree from the College of New Jersey (now Princeton University).

In 1754, Belcher was sent to Nova Scotia to become the first Chief Justice of the Nova Scotia Supreme Court. Prior to Belcher's arrival Nova Scotia had no formally trained law officers. He also served on the Nova Scotia Council. On July 28, 1755, he published a document which concluded that deportation of the Acadians was both authorized and required under the law. From 1761 to 1763, he was also Lieutenant Governor of Nova Scotia. He negotiated the peace that led to the Burying the Hatchet ceremony in Nova Scotia.

Belcher was a member of the American Philosophical Society, elected in 1768.

He died in office in 1776. He is buried in the Old Burying Ground in Halifax.

== Legacy ==
Belcher gave his name to Fort Belcher (1761–67), after which Fort Belcher Road, Lower Onslow, Nova Scotia is named. The fort was built at the same time as Fort Ellis.

Belcher married in King's Chapel, Boston, on 8 April 1756 to Abigail Allen. A salver (silver platter) given to them on their wedding day is now in the Metropolitan Museum of Art. They had five sons and two daughters.

== Gallery ==
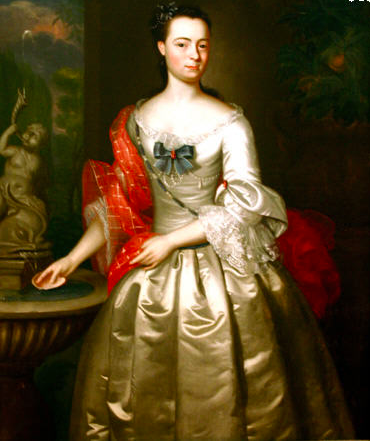
Portrait of Jonathan's wife, Abigail Belcher, by John Singleton Copley

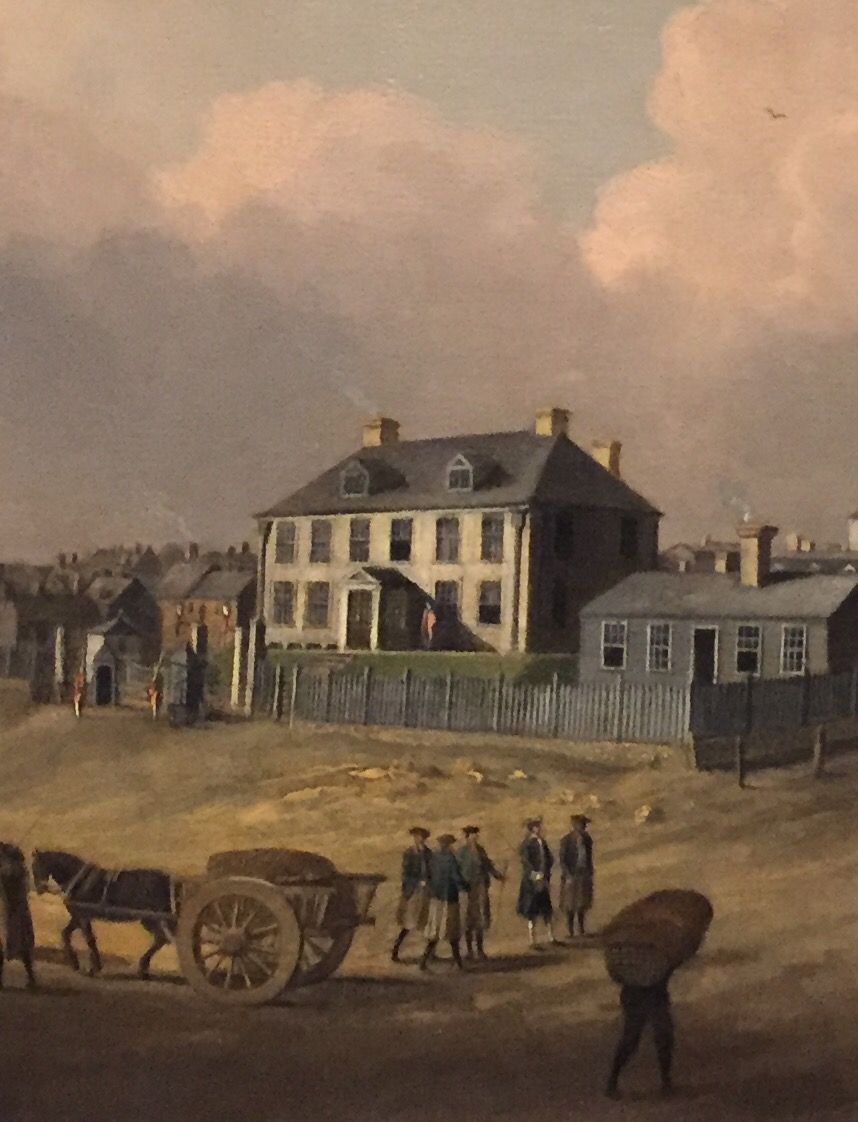
Lieutenant Governor Belcher's residence (built 1749). Located on the site of Province House, which still is furnished with his Nova Scotia Council table.

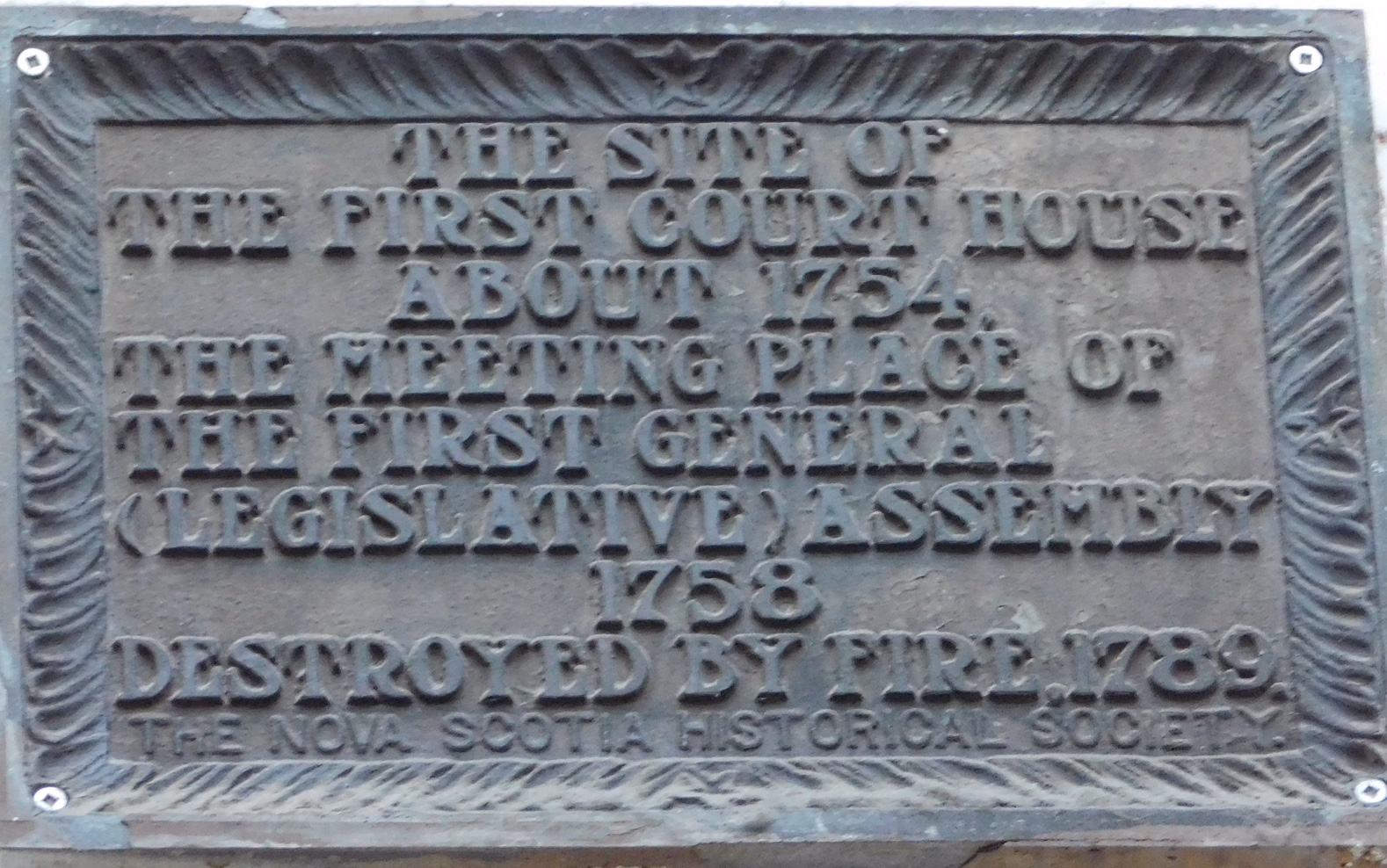
Site of First Court House Plaque, Royal Nova Scotia Historical Society, Scotia Square, Halifax

== Sources ==
- Nova Scotia Historical Society. 1914, p. 25
- Buggey, S. (1979). "Belcher, Jonathan". In Halpenny, Francess G. (ed.). Dictionary of Canadian Biography. Vol. IV (1771–1800) (online ed.). University of Toronto Press.

Political offices
Preceded by Charles Lawrence	Governor of Nova Scotia (acting); 1760-1763	Succeeded by Montague Wilmot
