= Andrew Belcher (merchant, born 1763) =

Canadian politician

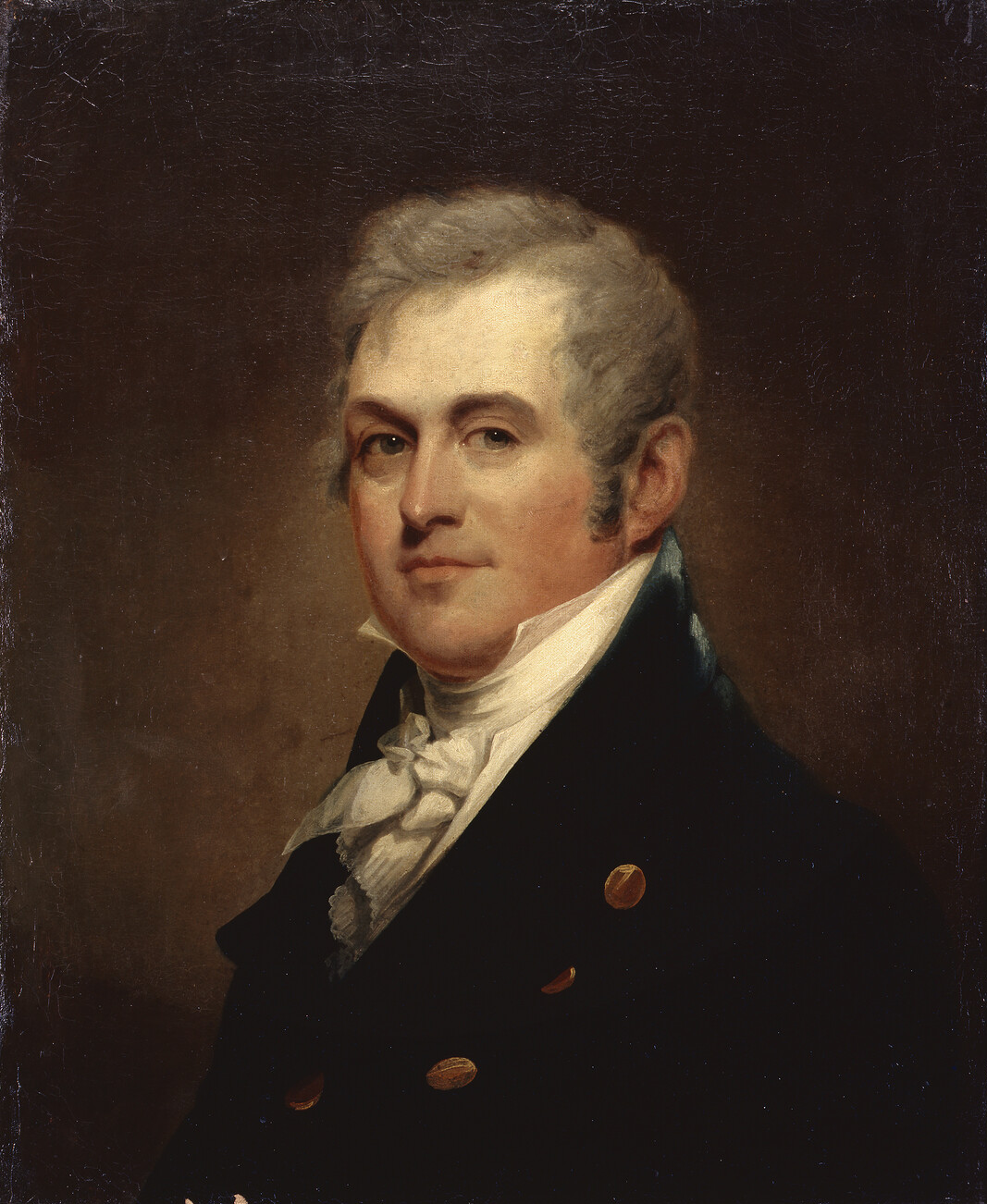
Portrait of Belcher by Robert Field, 1808 (Historic Deerfield, Massachusetts)

Andrew Belcher (July 22, 1763 – November 17, 1841) was a British North American merchant, politician and justice of the peace from Halifax, Nova Scotia.

Belcher was born in Halifax to father Jonathan Belcher, who was Nova Scotia's chief justice from 1754 to 1776. Andrew was young when his father died—subsequently, his life was influenced by Alexander Brymer, a prominent Scottish-born businessman located in Halifax.

Belcher had many years as an important part of the Nova Scotia business and political community. He was briefly a member of the Legislative Assembly for Halifax Township from April 16, 1800, until June 11, 1801, when he was appointed to the Council, which he served through 1813. After retiring to England, he suffered serious financial setbacks due to some questionable investments and a recession. Belcher returned to Halifax in 1829 to attempt to recover his wealth. He fled Halifax with his family in 1835, but died nearly destitute in Boulogne-sur-Mer, France.

Belcher was married in Boston in 1792 to Mary Ann Geyer (1770–1817), who bore him 11 children. One son, Edward Belcher, brought some positive recognition to the family name as leader of an Arctic expedition to search for Sir John Franklin.
