= Andrew Belcher (merchant, born 1706) =

Coat of Arms of Andrew Belcher

Andrew Belcher (1706–1771) was an American merchant who served on the Governor's Council of the Province of Massachusetts Bay from 1765 to 1767. Andrew married Elizabeth Teale and lived in Milton, Massachusetts.

Belcher was born in 1706, probably in Milton. He attended Harvard College, graduating in 1724. From 1759 to 1764, he served in the provincial assembly, and he was named to the governor's council in 1765. He died in 1771.

A brother, Jonathan Belcher, served as Colonial Governor of Nova Scotia. Their father, also named Jonathan Belcher, was a colonial governor of Massachusetts, New Hampshire and New Jersey.
