= T. H. Matteson =

American painter

Tompkins Harrison Matteson (1813-1884) was an American painter. Matteson was born in Peterboro, New York, in 1813. Matteson studied at the National Academy of Design and was inspired by the works of William Sidney Mount. Matteson's paintings are known for their historical, patriotic, and religious themes. One of his most famous paintings is Justice's Court in the Back Woods.

Tompkins ran a studio in New York City from 1841 to 1850. He died in Sherburne, New York, in 1884.

When Matteson died, the National Academy of Design recorded the following in their official minutes:

Resolved That we are grieved to record the death of Tompkins H. Matteson, A.N.A. on Feb. 2, 1884 at his residence at Sherburne, New York. Mr. Matteson was born in Madison Co. in this state in 1813. He was a student in the Academy Schools and in 1847 was elected an Associate. During his professional life in this city he was a constant and popular contributor to the Exhibitions— especially of American figure and genre subjects, a department to which for that time but few of our artists turned their attention, his works fairly meeting the public taste and requirement. He was a favorite and prolific designer for books and other illustrations and many of his more important pictures were engraved and circulated. He was an earnest student and an ambitious and industrious artist. He took great interest in the growth of his profession and was an active worker in all measures and efforts for its advancement. His friends will kindly recall his many amiable and excellent traits of character and his life and works will fill an honorable page in the history of American Art. Seconded and carried and a copy ordered to be sent to his family. (pages 327 and 328 NAD Records, Smithsonian Institution Archive of American Art).

== Gallery of works ==
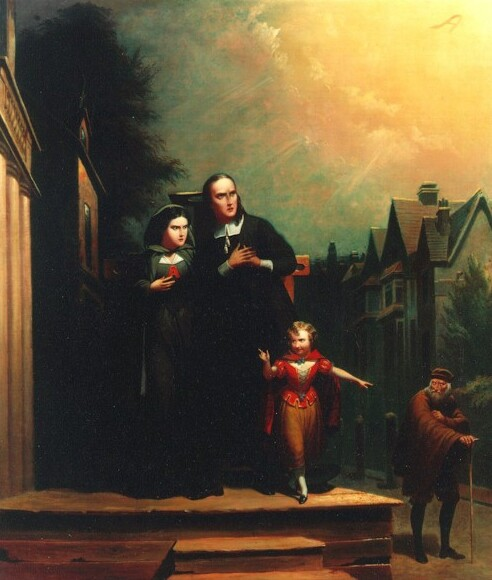
The Scarlet Letter

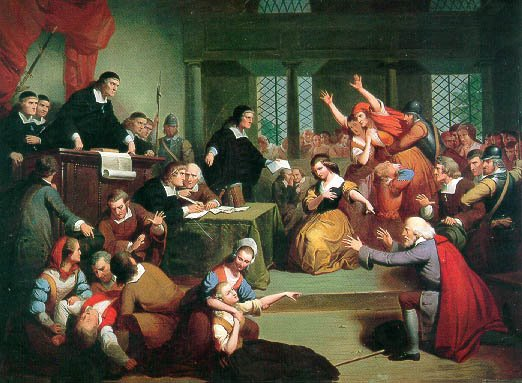
The Trial of George Jacobs, August 5th, 1692

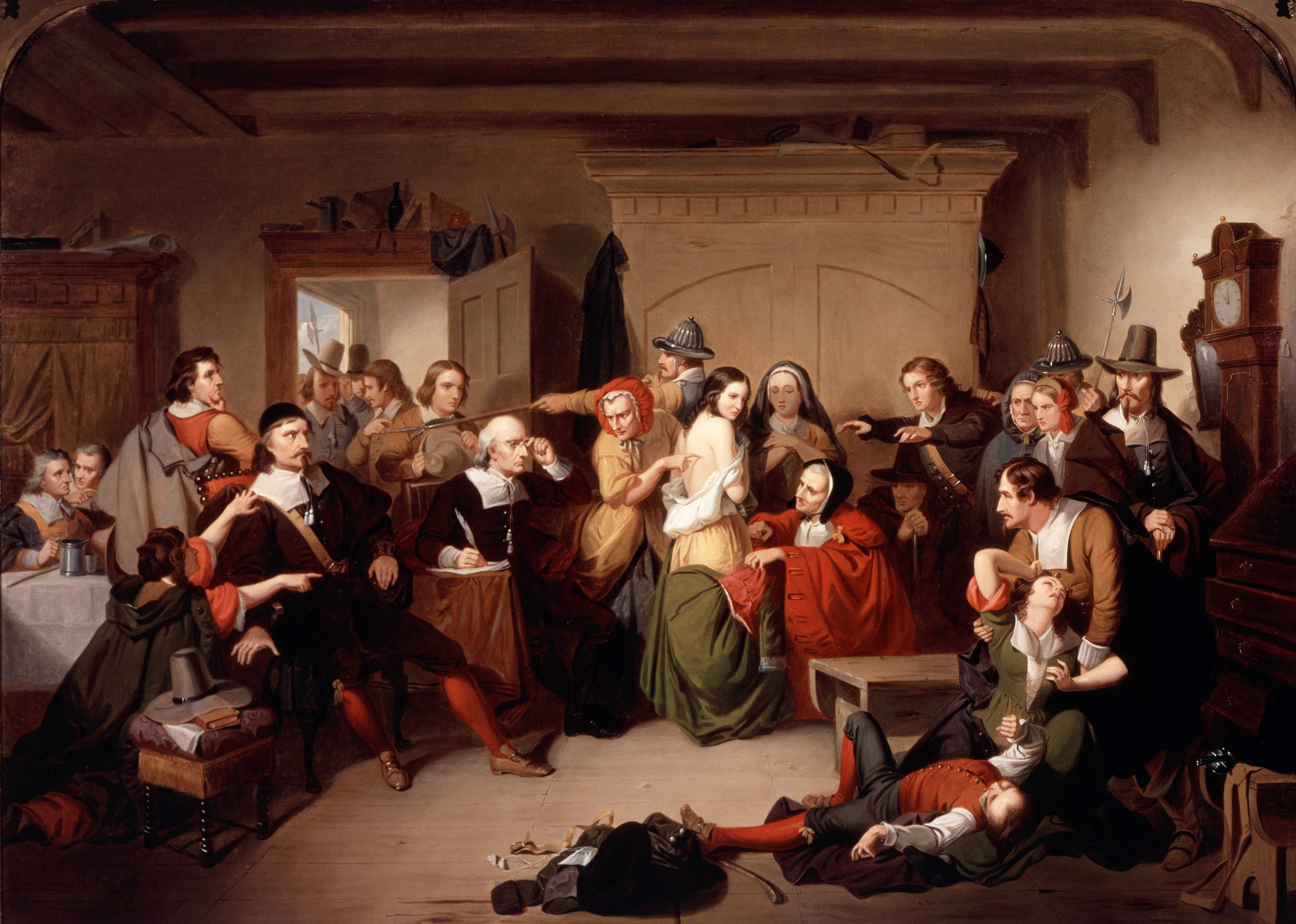
The Examination of a Witch

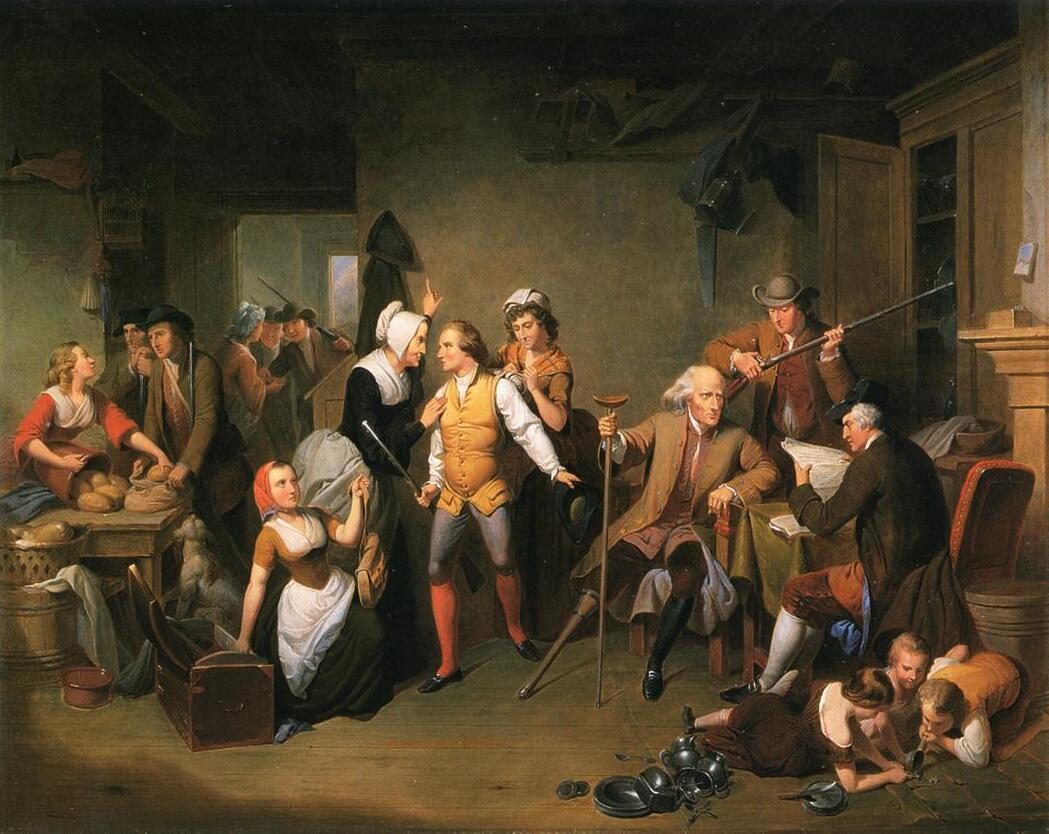
The Making of Ammunition

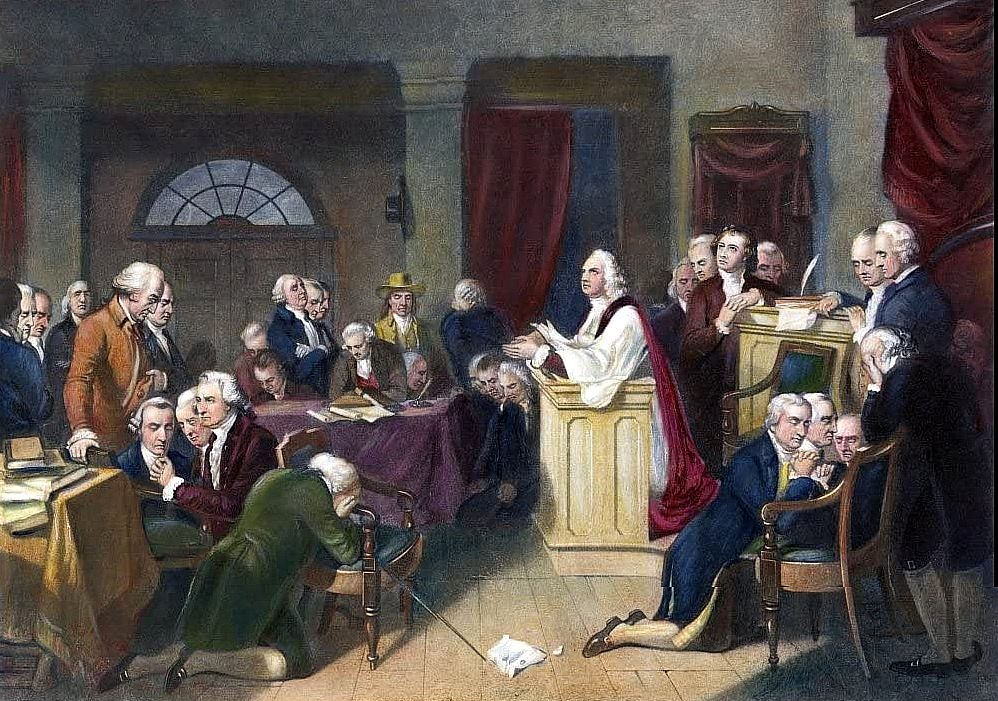
First Continental Congress at prayer (1848)

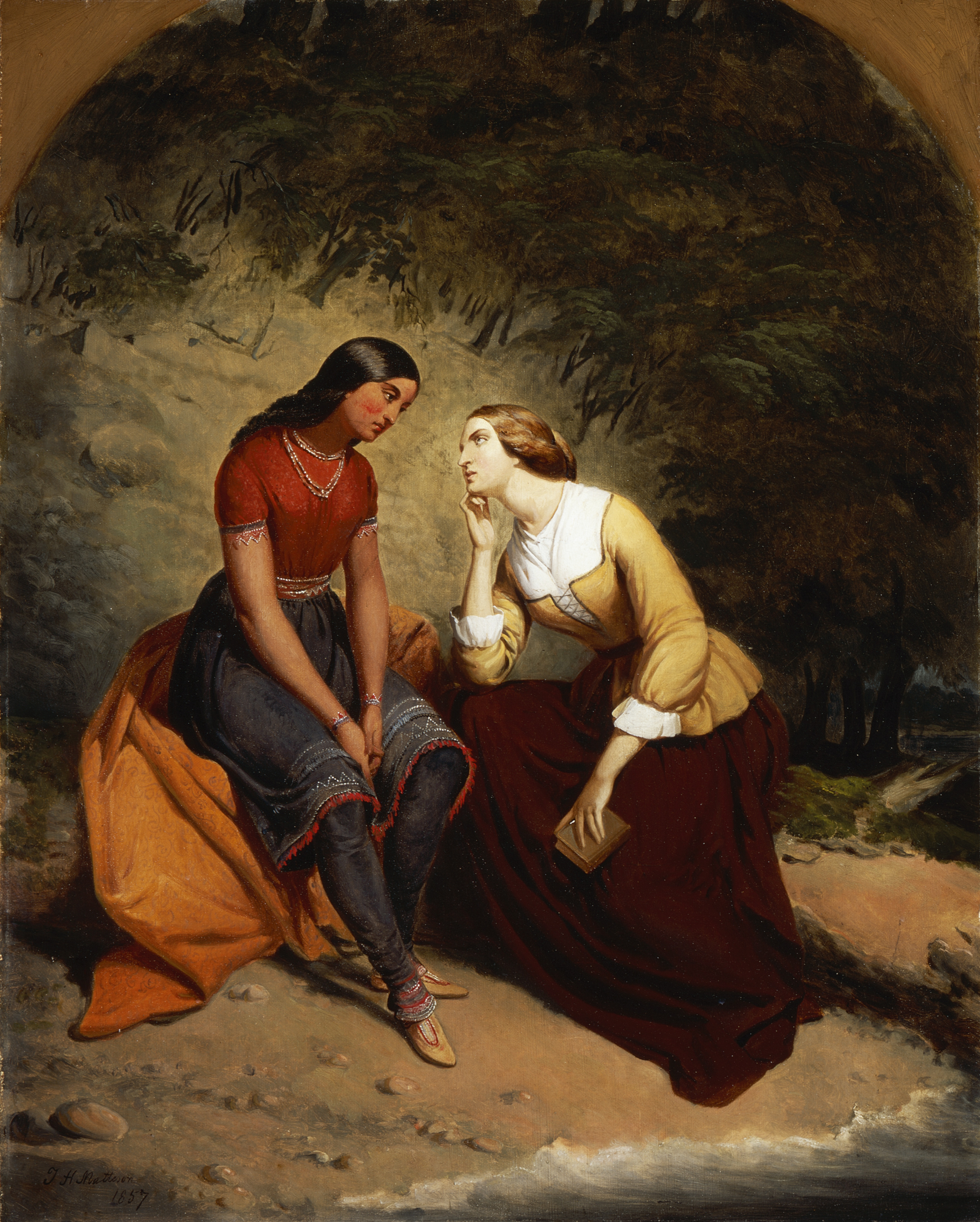
The Meeting of Hetty and Hist
