= William Cowell =

William Cowell may refer to:

- William Cowell Sr. (1682–1736), American silversmith
- Butch Cowell (William Harold Cowell, 1887–1940), American football player and coach of football, basketball, and baseball
- Billy Cowell (1902–?), footballer

== See also ==
- Bill Cowell (John William Joseph Cowell, 1887–1956), Australian rules footballer
