= Bradford Town Hall =

Bradford Town Hall may refer to:

- Bradford City Hall, Bradford, West Yorkshire, England (previously named Bradford Town Hall)
- Bradford Town Hall (New Hampshire), United States, listed on the NRHP in New Hampshire
