= Jeremiah Dummer (silversmith) =

American silversmith and painter

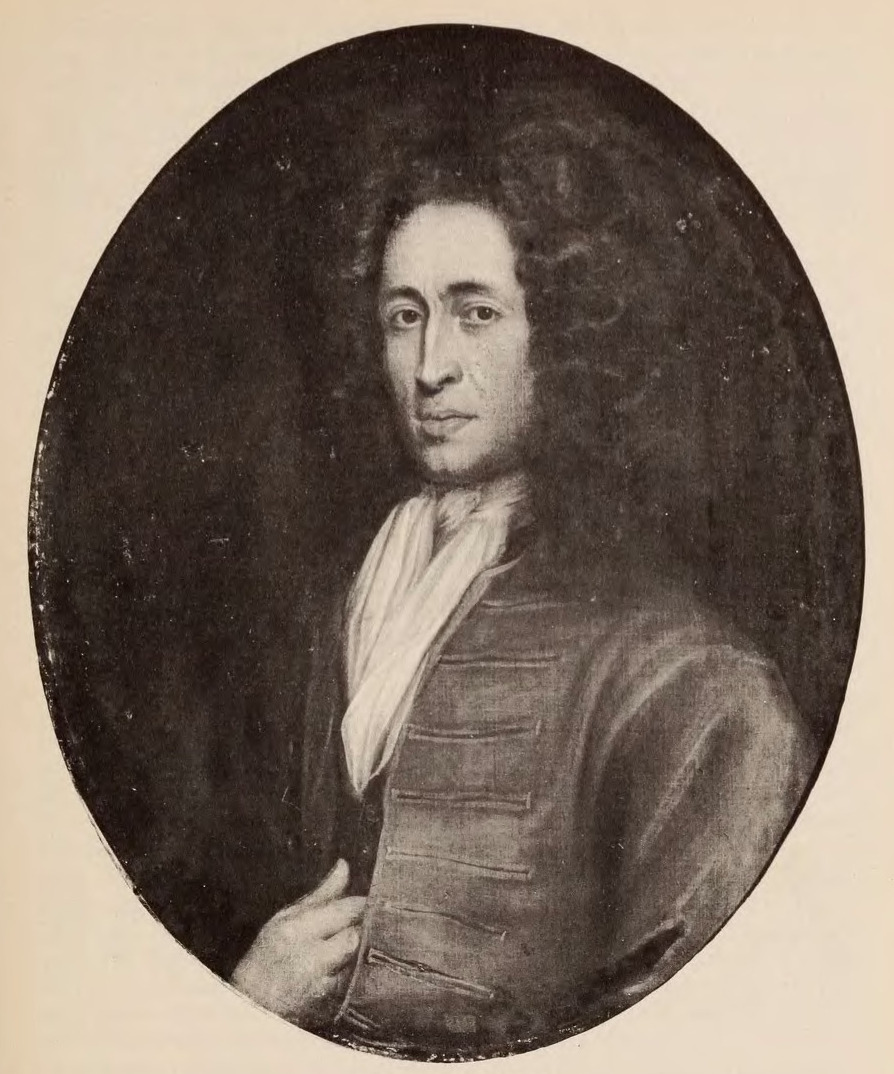
- Self-portrait of Dummer
- Born: September 14, 1645; Newbury, Massachusetts Bay Colony
- Died: May 24, 1718 (aged 72); Boston, Province of Massachusetts Bay
- Occupations: Silversmith, painter, engraver
- Known for: First American-born silversmith
- Children: 8, including Jeremiah and William
- Father: Richard Dummer

Jeremiah Dummer (September 14, 1645 – May 24, 1718) was a silversmith, painter, and engraver from the Thirteen Colonies. He created the first paper currency in the Connecticut Colony, and his son Jeremiah Dummer was involved with the foundation of Yale University.

== Life ==
Dummer was born in Newbury, Massachusetts Bay Colony, the first son of Richard Dummer and his second wife, Frances Burr.

At the age of 14, he was apprenticed to John Hull, the mintmaster at Boston. Hull recorded at the time that he "received into my house Jeremie Dummer ... to serve me as Apprentice eight years". When he was 23 he started on his own and became a prolific and notable silversmith making tankards, beakers, porringers, caudle cups and candlesticks. The fluted band on a plain surface is characteristic of his work. He is said to have introduced into American silver the ornamentation known as "gadrooning", curved flutings on the surface of silver.

He held many public offices, and was a Member and Captain of the Ancient and Honorable Artillery Society in 1671 and Constable of Boston in 1675–76. He was appointed Freeman of Boston in 1680, a member of Capt Hutchinson's Company in 1684, a member of the Council of Safety against Andres in 1689, a Selectman of Boston 1691–92, Judge of the Court of Common Pleas for Suffolk County 1702–15, Treasurer of Suffolk County 1711–16, and was a member in full communion at the venerable First Church.

He was also an engraver, and engraved plates for currency: in 1710 he printed the first paper money in Connecticut. When the government of Connecticut decided in 1709 to issue paper currency, or Bills of Exchange, Dummer was selected to do the engraving of the plates and the printing of the bills. Journals of the council for 1710 show transactions with Dummer relating to this currency, and in 1712 Governor Saltonstall laid before the Council Board Dummer's bill for printing 6,550 sheets of this paper currency. Dummer's former apprentice, John Coney, had the distinction of engraving the plates for the first paper money issued by Massachusetts some years previously, the first issued on the American continent, although some sources also credit Dummer with the engraving of the Massachusetts copper plates.

Dummer was also one America's foremost early portrait painters. Among his paintings are a self-portrait and portrait of his wife, Anna, together with portraits of many of his contemporaries.

He died on May 24, 1718, in Boston. His obituary printed in the Boston News-Letter on June 2, 1718, said:

Departed this life Jeremiah Dummer, Esqr., in the 73rd year of his Age, after a long retirement ... having served his country faithfully in several Publick Stations, and obtained of all that knew him the Character of a Just, Virtuous, and Pious Man;

== Apprentices ==
His apprentices included:

- John Coney (brother-in-law) (c. 1668)
- Eleazer Russell (c. 1677)
- Edward Winslow (c. 1682)
- Kiliaen Van Rensselaer (1683)
- John Edwards (c. 1684)
- John Allen (1685)
- John Noyes (c. 1687)
- William Cowell Sr. (c. 1695)
- Daniel Gookin (1696–1704)
- Shubael Dummer (nephew) (c. 1699)

== Works ==
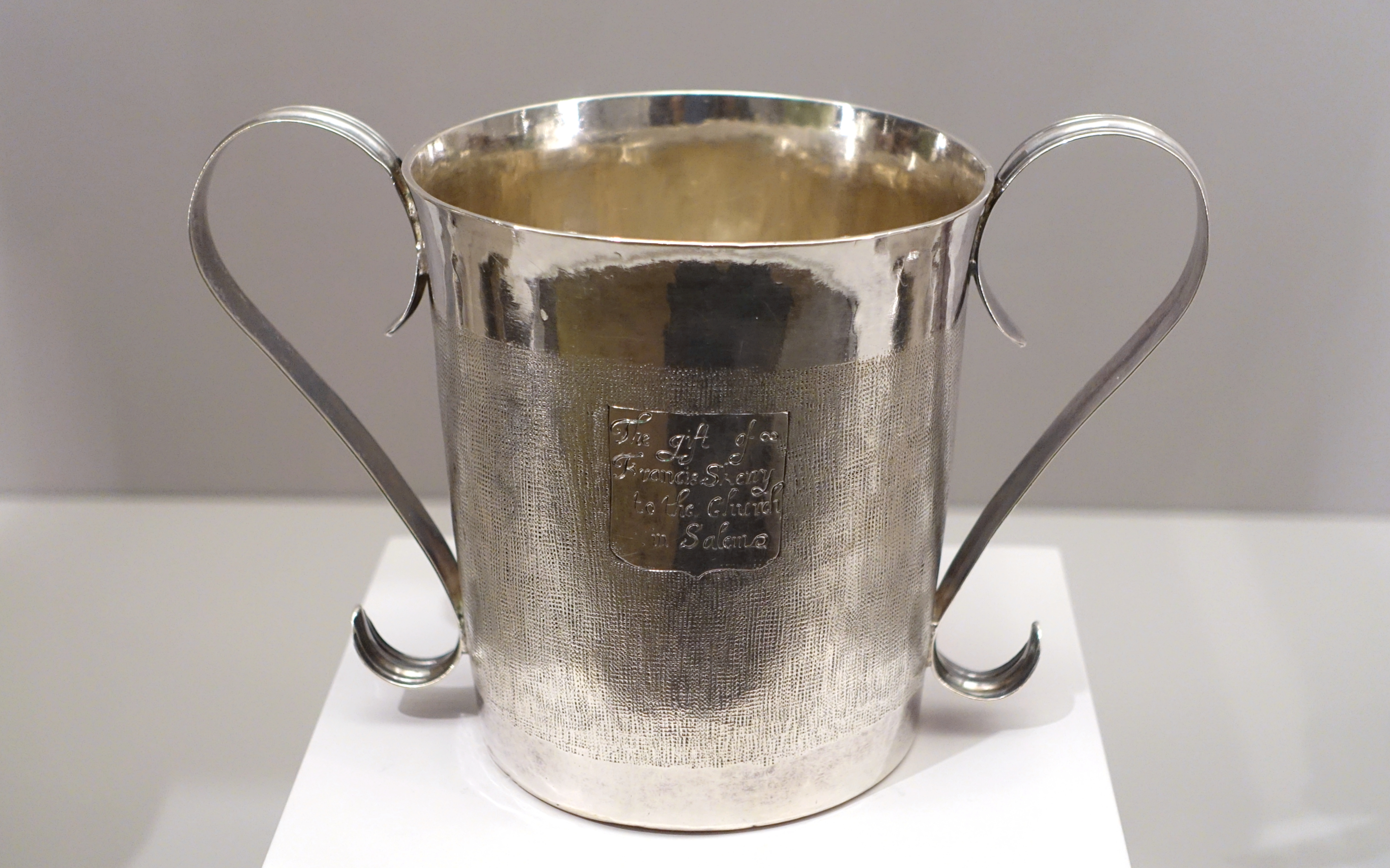
Francis Skerry Beaker, c. 1670

He was a prolific craftsman and over one hundred pieces listed as made by him have been preserved. Dummer's silverwork mark is "ID enclosed over a fleur-de-lis in a heart or occasionally ID in a rectangle".

Among his works in public museum collections:

Boston Museum of Fine Arts

- Porringer, c. 1665 – 1670. Engraved "NG" for Nabby (Abigail) Gardiner and "B over E M" for Ebenezer and Mary [Turner] Bowditch. The handle design is believed to be unique in American silver.
- Caudle cup, c. 1680. The only floral decorated caudle cup by Dummer.
- Spout cup, c. 1680. Engraved "SCE" around center point on bottom; "1680" on side. Made for Stephen Codman and Elizabeth Randall, m 1674. One of only two Spout cups by Dummer.
- Spout cup, c. 1680 – 1700. Engraved "H over D E" for Daniel and Elizabeth (Garrish) Henchman. It is the only known example of a two-handled spout cup by an American silversmith.
- Standing salt, 1690–1700. One of only three American silver standing salts known to survive — a good example of the early Baroque style.
- Baptismal Bowl, 1695. The property of the First Parish, Cambridge. The bowl was made and presented to Brattle in 1695 by his Harvard students, as the original inscription "Ex dono Pupillorum" indicates. The Brattle coat of arms is engraved on the rim. The bowl bears Dummer's mark, a heart-shaped device within which are his initials, with a small pellet between the initial, and a fleur-de-lis. It was made for domestic use.
- Communion cup, c. 1700. Engraved "gifft / of / E B" for Edward Brattle, brother of Thomas Brattle, one of the founders of the Brattle Street Church for whom the cup was made.
- Communion cup, 1700. Engraved "Ex dono / Mr. Joshua & / Mrs. Hannah / Bangs / To The Church of Eastham / 1700". This is the earliest example in this form.

Yale University Art Gallery

- Pair of candlesticks, c. 1686. The coat of arms of Col. Peter Lidgett, a rich merchant, are on the base. These are the earliest surviving American-made silver candlesticks known. These candlesticks are the property of Yale University Art Gallery and were included in a temporary exhibition "Life, Liberty and the Pursuit of Happiness" at Seattle Art Museum (February to May 2009) and the Birmingham Museum of Art (October 2009 to January 2010).
- Beaker, c.1697. This beaker is one of twelve that was made by various silversmiths for the First Church of Ipswich and made with silver donated by Captain Simon Stacy, whose name is engraved on the side.
- Two-handled Bowl, ca. 1690–1700. The bowl in engraved with the initials "RPI" that probably stand for Richard and Jane Pattishall. This form is thought to be unique in American silver and was probably influenced by seventeenth-century Portuguese silver. Dummer had trade connections with Portugal and there were examples of Iberian silver in Boston at this time that may have served as sources for the design.
- Spoon, ca. 1685–1700. The spoon has an oval bowl with foliate stamped decoration and bears the initials "NRM" engraved on the back of the handle. The initials are for Rev. Noadiah and Mary Russell, who were wed in 1690.

Seattle Art Museum

- Tankard, 1685. Made for Simeon Stoddard's marriage to Mary Downing. With its large, three quart size and elaborate chinoiserie decoration, it is ranked among the finest extant pieces of early American silver, described as "extremely rare due to its size and unusual floral and bird design motifs".

Art Institute of Chicago

- Tankard, 1696–1705. Handle engraved in Roman capitals:"B / IE". Maker's mark on lid and on body in Roman capitals: "ID" in a heart with a star below.

Historic Deerfield

- Caudle cup, c. 1690. Engraved on base "G" over "IA" for Joseph and Anna (Waldron) Gerrish.

Winterthur Library

- Tankard, c. 1693. Engraved "R" over "D S" for Daniel and Sarah (Appleton) Rogers.

Bayou Bend Collection

- Caudle cup, 1666–1672. An inscription reveals that a Margaret Thacher first owned the cup. In 1672 she gave the cup to the First Church of Dorchester, Massachusetts, where it held communion wine.

=== Works at auction ===
From time to time, Dummer's work comes up for auction.

In January 2005, several pieces of silver from the First Church of Christ, Farmington, Connecticut, came up for auction at Sotheby's, New York. Top prices were achieved by a silver two-handled cup c. 1690 ($144,000), a silver two-handled cup c. 1675 ($168,000) and a silver two-handled cup, by John Hull and Robert Sanderson, overstruck by Jeremiah Dummer, c. 1670 which fetched the top price of $204,000.

In January 2007, a beaker from 1670 was auctioned at the New York auction house Christie's, with an estimate of $150,000 to $250,000. The cup, which was given to The First Church in Salem in 1684 by Francis Skerry, who ran a local malt house, realised $204,000, and was bought by an "anonymous collector".

== Family ==
Coat of Arms of Jeremiah Dummer

In 1672, he was married in Boston to Anna Atwater, daughter of Joseph Atwater of Boston. They had eight children:

- Samuel (1673–1737), became Sheriff of Middlesex County 1729–31
- Mary (1673–1691)
- Jeremiah (1675–1677)
- William (1677–1761), who became Governor of the Province of Massachusetts Bay
- Richard (1680–1689)
- Jeremiah (1681–1739), who was involved in the foundation of Yale University
- Anna (1684–1764), married John Powell of Boston, merchant. She was the grandmother of William Dummer Powell who became a judge and political figure in Upper Canada.
- Samuel (1689–1737)

His half-brother, Shubael (1636–1692), founded the first Congregational church at York, Maine, in 1672 and was killed by Abenakis in the Candlemas Massacre of 1692.
