= Christopher Hussey =

Christopher Hussey may refer to:

- Chris Hussey (born 1989), English footballer
- Christopher Hussey (died 1686) (1599–1686), English colonial official
- Christopher Hussey (historian) (1889–1970), British architectural historian
