= Shubael Dummer =

American Congregational church minister who was killed in the Raid on York

- Born: February 16, 1636; Roxbury Massachusetts, British America
- Died: January 25, 1692 (aged 55); York, Massachusetts, British America
- Occupation: Reverend
- Years active: 1660–1692
- Known for: Minister of York, Massachusetts
- Spouse: Lydia Alcock (m. circa 1665)
- Children: 2
- Parent(s): Richard Dummer and Mary Mason
- Relatives: Jeremiah Dummer (brother)

Rev. Shubael Dummer (February 16, 1636 – January 25, 1692) was an American Congregational church minister who was killed in the Raid on York in York, Massachusetts Bay Colony. Described as a man of "beautiful Christian character", Dummer founded the First Parish Congregational Church of York, the oldest church congregation in what is now the U.S. state of Maine.

== Family and education ==
Coat of Arms of Shubael Dummer

Dummer was born at Roxbury, Massachusetts on February 16, 1636, the son of Richard Dummer (1589–1679) and his first wife Mary Jane Mason. Richard was a settler, who had arrived at Boston from England in May 1632 with Mary, and was an associate of the radical Puritan malcontent Stephen Bachiler. Mary was a follower of Roger Williams and Anne Hutchinson, leading to her and Richard becoming banished to Boston. Soon after the birth of Shubael, Mary became ill and died in February 1636.

Following the death of his wife, Richard returned to England. It is not known whether or not he was accompanied by his infant son; Richard returned to New England in May 1638 on board the Bevis and Shubael is not listed as one of the passengers.

Dummer was brought up under the ministry of Rev. Thomas Parker, one of the most eminent scholars and Christians among the founders of New England, who educated him and prepared him for admission to college. He went up to Harvard, from where he graduated in 1656 at the age of twenty.

Shortly afterwards at Salisbury, he married Lydia Alcock, daughter of John and Elizabeth Alcock.

Richard remarried (to Frances Burr) in 1643 and their first son, Jeremiah, was born on September 14. He was to become the first American-born silversmith. Jeremiah's sons included William, who became Governor of the Province of Massachusetts Bay, and Jeremiah, who was involved in the foundation of Yale University.

== Ministry ==
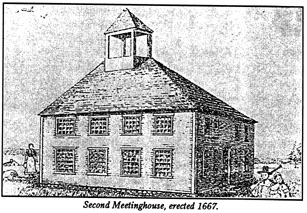
The meeting house at York

At the age of 24, he became a preacher in Salisbury, where he remained for two years, before settling in York in 1662. In 1660, the town of Salisbury tried unsuccessfully to obtain his services as minister.

Dummer was made a Freeman of Massachusetts Colony on May 3, 1665.

The meeting house at York was built in 1667 on "land given to the use of the ministry", part of it a glebe granted by Governor Edward Godfrey for the maintenance of a "house for the worship of God and endowment of minister." It was situated at what is now Lindsay Road close to Barrells Millpond.

On December 3, 1672, he was ordained to the Ministry and settled over the church at York, on the recommendation of Richard Banks, his brother-in-law, and Edward Rishworth. At his ordination, he preached a sermon from Psalm 80:14 based on the lines: "Return, O Lord, and visit this vine".

On July 7, 1674, his father made over to him lands at Byfield. The following year, he was listed as administrator of the estate of his father-in-law, John Alcock, together with his brothers-in-law, Joseph Alcock and Richard Banks.

At this time, the people of the church were poor with the early settlers in the town being adventurers; the town had had no one preacher for any length of time and was seen as "an asylum for excommunicated and itinerant ministers". According to the writer Cotton Mather, Dummer "spent very much of his own patrimony to subsist among the people". In 1690, he went to Boston to secure help, for at that time things were hard-going for the people of Maine and southern New Hampshire.

The parish records were lost when the church was destroyed by fire, and consequently there is little detailed information about Dummer's thirty years at York. Dummer is known, however, to have officiated at the wedding of James Smith of Berwick and Martha Mills at Wells in June 1677.

Despite his family advising him to find a safer ministry, Dummer continued to support the people of the town through their various trials and sufferings on account of the Indian wars and urged the townspeople to maintain their ground, and not allow their homes and farms to be destroyed by the enemy, as had some of the surrounding settlements. According to Cotton Mather:

Though solicited with many temptations to leave his place, when the clouds grew thick and dark in the Indian hostilities, and was like to break upon it, he chose, rather, with a paternal affection to stay amongst those who had been so many of them converted and edified by his ministry.

After Dummer's death, Mather gave this eulogy:

Our Dummer, the minister of York, was one of whom, for his exemplary holiness, humbleness, modesty, industry and fidelity, the world was not worthy. He was a gentleman well descended, well tempered, and well educated . . . He might have taken for the coat of arms, the same that the holy martyr Hooper did prophetically, - a lamb in a flaming bush, with rays from heaven shining of it.

== Death ==
On January 25, 1692, a band of Abenaki, together with several French Canadians, ventured south, making their way on snow shoes over the deep snow. The attackers waited until daybreak when they posted themselves at the door of each dwelling.

Dummer was one of the first to be killed as he was about to mount his horse to visit a sick parishioner. The invaders stripped and mutilated his corpse; his friends, who escaped by being in the garrisoned houses, or on the west side of the river, later found his body near his own door, "naked and in his blood, with his face to the ground". Capt. John Flood, who had come with the militia from Portsmouth, found on his arrival that "the greatest part of the whole town was burned and robbed," with nearly 50 killed and another 100 captured. He reported that Rev. Dummer was "barbarously murthered, stript naked, cut and mangled by these sons of Beliall."

Before the invaders marched off their hostages, they sent back the youngest children and the oldest women. Dummer's widow, Lydia, was among those freed, but she shuttled back and forth to the raiders' camp so often, begging for the release of her infant son, that she was taken with the rest of the hostages. The captives were marched off "through snows and hardships among those dragons of the desert" where Lydia also died. On the first Sabbath after they started on their journey, an Abenaki, dressed in the clothes stripped from Dummer's dead body, "paraded himself before them with mock dignity, and in derision of a Puritan minister – a devil as an angel of light".

It is not known what became of the boy.

== Obituary ==
Dummer, the shepherd sacrificed
By wolves, because the sheep he prized.
The orphan's father, churches light,
The love of heaven, of hell the spite.
The country's gapman, and the face
That shone, but knew it not, with grace.
Hunted by devils, but relieved
By angels, and on high received.
The martyred pelican, who bled
Rather than leave his charge unfed.
A proper bird of paradise,
Shot and flown thither in a trice.

Lord, hear the cry of righteous Dummer's wounds,
Ascending still against the savage hounds,
That worry thy dear flock, and let the cry
Add force to theirs that at thine altar lie.

— Cotton Mather

== Notes ==
A. Some sources give her name as "Alcott", although this is believed to be a simple discrepancy in spelling. Several, older, sources claim that his wife was Mary, the daughter of Edward Rishworth.
B. Banks was married to Elizabeth Alcock, sister of Lydia. He was later to be killed in the January 1692 massacre.
