= Jonathan Barnes House =

Historic house in New Hampshire, United States

- U.S. National Register of Historic Places
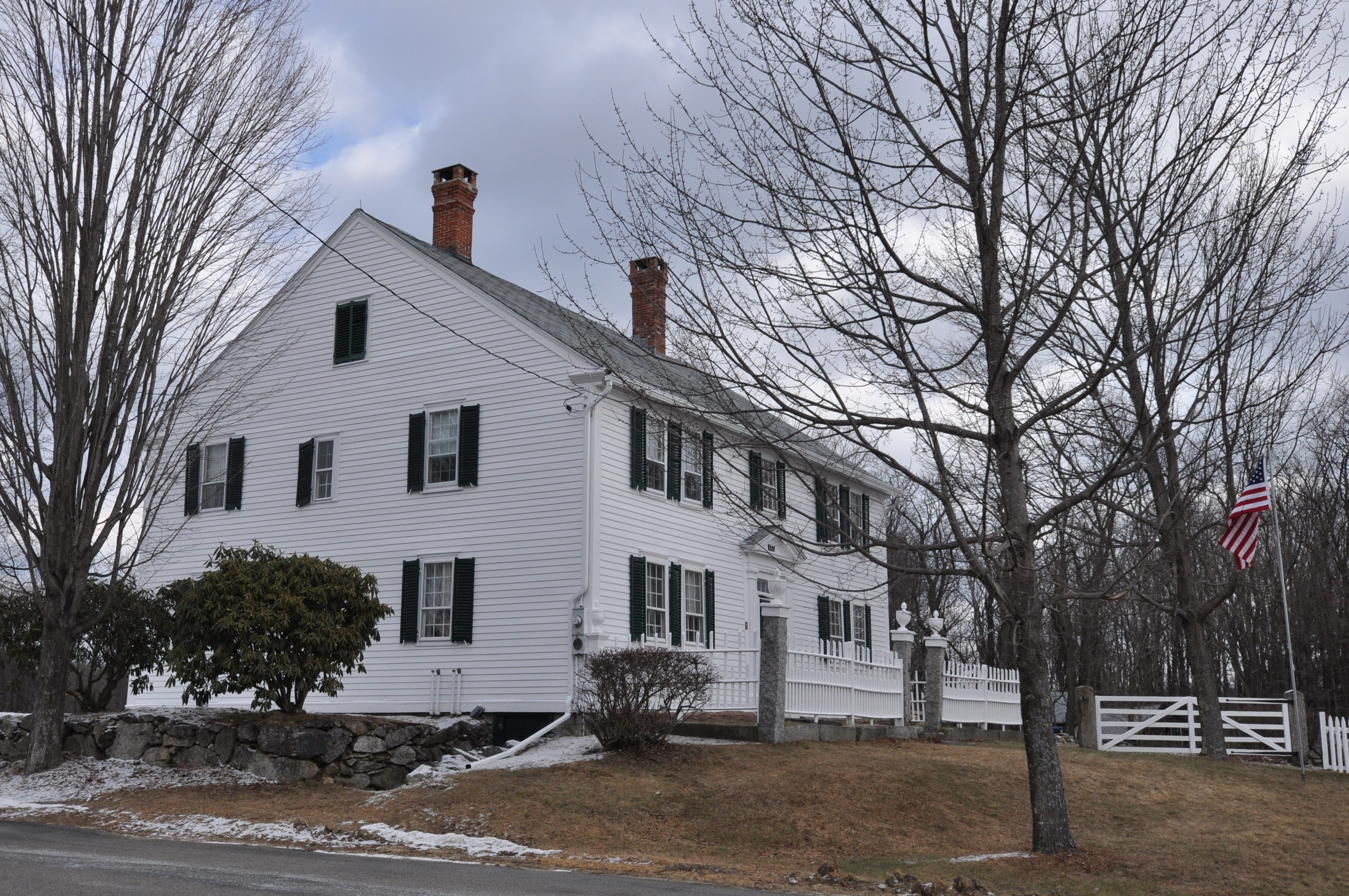

- Location within New Hampshire Location within the United States
- Location: North Rd., Hillsborough Center, New Hampshire
- Coordinates: 43°8′51″N 71°56′2″W
- Area: 2.5 acres (1.0 ha)
- Built: 1773
- Built by: Baldwin, Capt. Isaac
- Architectural style: Georgian
- NRHP reference No.: 82001680
- Added to NRHP: March 1, 1982

The Jonathan Barnes House is a historic house on North Street in Hillsborough, New Hampshire. Built about 1775, it is locally distinctive as one of only a few colonial-era houses, and is a well-preserved example of Georgian styling. It has also seen a number of socially significant uses, serving at times as a tavern, library, music school, and fraternal lodge. Surviving interior architectural details provide a significant view into the history of tavern architecture. The house was listed on the National Register of Historic Places in 1982.

== Description and history ==
The Jonathan Barnes House stands in the rural village of Hillsborough Center, on the east side of the triangular junction of Center and North streets. It is a 2 1/2-story wood-frame structure, with a gabled roof, two interior chimneys, and a clapboarded exterior, and is oriented facing south. The main facade is five bays wide, with a center entrance flanked by Tuscan pilasters and topped by a transom window and gabled pediment. Windows are rectangular sash with corniced caps; that above the entrance is smaller than the others. Two additions project from the east side of the main building, one of which is also of early construction. An 18th-century barn is located on the property to the north of the house.

The interior of the house follows a typical center hall plan, with two rooms on either side of the main hall. The rooms on the west side of the hall have fixtures consistent with their use as a tavern, and the second-floor chambers above them have configurable partition walls, enabling the space to be turned into a single large ballroom.

The house was built c. 1773-75 for the Rev. Jonathan Barnes, the first settled minister of the town. Local lore says that it was built by Isaac Baldwin, a local master carpenter who lost is life in the Battle of Bunker Hill, early in the American Revolutionary War. The house has seen a wide array of uses, including as a library (founded in 1797), music school, marching band facility (1825), and Masonic lodge. The tavern-related features of the interior are among the best-preserved of their type in the region.

== See also ==
- National Register of Historic Places listings in Hillsborough County, New Hampshire
- New Hampshire historical marker no. 107: Colonial Grant
