= Thomas Mason (priest) =

English clergyman and writer

Thomas Mason (1580–1619?) was an English clergyman and writer.

== Life ==
On his own account, his father was the heir of Sir John Mason. Mason was admitted at Magdalen College, Oxford, on 29 November 1594, matriculated on 7 January 1595. He may not have graduated; there is possible confusion with another Thomas Mason at Magdalen of the period.

From 1614 to 1619, Mason held the vicarage of Odiham in Hampshire, and probably died around 1620. On 13 April 1621 his widow, Helen Mason, obtained a licence for twenty-one years to reprint his version of Foxe's Book of Martyrs for the benefit of herself and her children. Its dedications to George Abbot and Sir Edward Coke probably proved their value in getting this protection, for a book that reflected typical political prejudices of the time after the Gunpowder Plot. About ten years later Helen Mason's attempt to stretch the monopoly to cover a new abridgement of Foxe's work ran into a legal rebuff.

== Works ==
He published:

- Christ's Victorie over Sathan's Tyrannie, London, 1615; a condensed version of John Foxe's ‘Book of Martyrs,’ with extracts from other works. The running title is ‘The Acts of the Church.’ An enlarged edition appeared in 1747–8 in 2 vols., edited by "Rev. Mr. Bateman, Rector of St. Bartholomew the Great", i.e. Richard Thomas Bateman.
- A Revelation of the Revelation … whereby the Pope is most plainly declared and proved to be Anti-Christ, London, 1619.

== Family ==
Mason's widow Helen married Stephen Bachiler, as his second wife, or third wife, in 1627. Richard Dummer married Thomas and Helen's daughter (Mary) Jane.

== Notes ==
Attribution

This article incorporates text from a publication now in the public domain: Porter, Bertha (1893). "Mason, Thomas". Dictionary of National Biography. Vol. 36. pp. 436–437.
