= John Coney (silversmith) =

American silversmith and goldsmith

- Born: January 5, 1655
- Died: 20 August 1722 (aged 67)
- Spouse: Mary Atwater (m. 1694)
- Children: 12

John Coney (January 5, 1655 – August 20, 1722) was a silversmith and goldsmith from Boston, Massachusetts. He specialized in engraving. From the 1690s on, Coney was considered the most important Bostonian silversmith of his day. In 1702, he engraved the paper money for Massachusetts. Coney also designed a version of the seal of Harvard College.

John Coney was the apprentice of and later brother-in-law to Jeremiah Dummer, the first American-born silversmith. He married Mary Atwater, sister of Dummer's wife, in 1694. They were widower and widow, Coney had been married twice before. He had twelve children in total, but only five daughters survived beyond infancy.

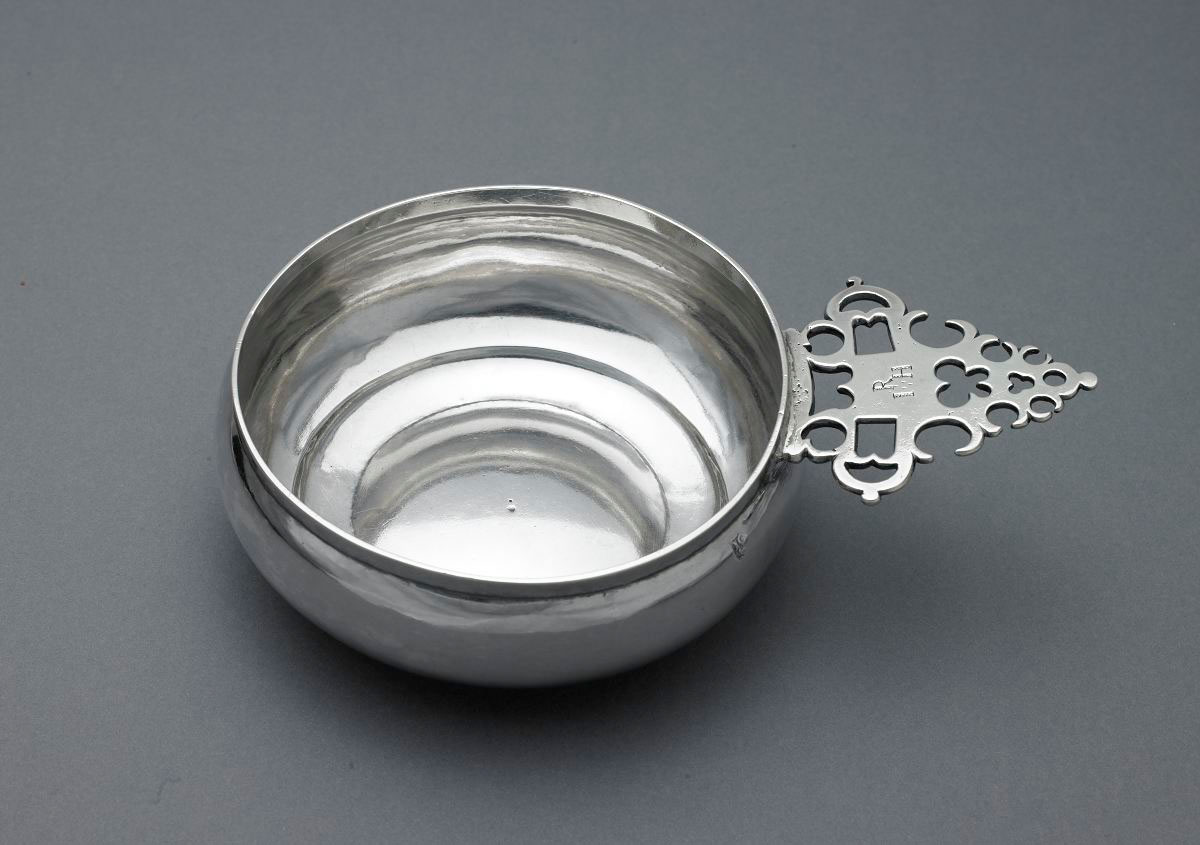
A silver porringer created by John Coney, c. 1710, Birmingham Museum of Art

His last apprentice, from 1716 until the time of Coney's death, was Apollos Rivoire, father of Paul Revere, and his indirect influence on Revere was considerable. Other apprentices included the brothers Samuel (1684–1713) and John (1692–1720) Gray, early silversmiths from Connecticut, and John Burt.

Many examples of his work, including two sugar boxes and two chocolate pots, are in the Museum of Fine Arts, Boston. Other public collections containing Coney's work include the Metropolitan Museum of Art, the Birmingham Museum of Art, and the Yale University Art Gallery. A silver plate by Coney was sold for $324,750 at Sotheby's in New York in 2002.
