= Richard Dummer =

American settler

Richard Dummer (c.1589—14 December 1679) was an early settler in New England.

He made his fortune as a trader, operating in the port of Southampton, England. He was a Puritan, which at times was contrary to the Established Church and the monarch. He emigrated to the Massachusetts Bay Colony, becoming a founding father there, setting up a stock company, acquiring estates, and establishing a milling business. His eldest son was slain by Indians. Another of his sons was the first American-born silversmith. His grandson William was Governor of the Province of Massachusetts Bay and instrumental in bringing to an end the Indian Wars, and bequeathed his estates to trustees for the establishment of what became the Governor Dummer Academy, the first school of its kind in the province.

== Early life ==
Coat of Arms of Richard Dummer

Dummer was born in Bishopstoke, Hampshire, the son of Thomas and Joane Dummer; as the parish registers have been lost, there is no record of his birth or baptism, although it is likely that he was born at Bishopstoke around 1589.

He trained as an attorney, and was involved with his brothers in maritime import and export from the nearby port of Southampton, becoming a competent seaman and attaining the status of "master".

== The Plough Company ==
Dummer became closely associated with the radical Puritan malcontent Stephen Bachiler, who wanted to take his flock at Newton Stacey (near Wherwell, Hampshire) to New England. Bachiler married Helena Mason, the widow of Revd. Thomas Mason of Odiham, and Dummer married Mary Jane, the daughter of Helena and Thomas Mason.

Dummer was involved with Bachiler and others in the setting up of a joint stock company, "The Plough Company", to plant working colonists in New England. Although not a member of the religious Company of Husbandmen, Dummer was persuaded by Bachiler to help finance the enterprise. Described as "a man of breadth and ability", his connections must have been valuable to the struggling company. Accordingly, he outfitted a small ship, The Plough, which sailed for Massachusetts with 80 people in 1631. He then sailed with his new wife, Mary, for Boston on The Whale, arriving on 24 May 1632.

Upon his arrival he found that the project had collapsed; he set out to salvage the company, and through the Massachusetts courts he seized the remaining material and assets of the whole group, and eventually all the Plough Company's patents, to the anger of some of the investors back in England. In 1643, Dummer sold the patents through George Cleeve to Alexander Rigby, one of Cromwell's commanders; thus Dummer was the only person who derived a profit from the defunct Plough Company.

== Roxbury ==
Dummer settled in Roxbury, where he took an active part in the affairs of the young colony, being made a Freeman on 6 November 1632. He and his wife Mary are listed among the founding members of the first church at Roxbury.

The next year he built a water-powered gristmill in Roxbury, the first water-powered mill built to grind corn in New England. By order of the General Court on 4 March 1634, the tax on his real estate in Roxbury and Saugus was reduced, probably because of his enterprise for the public good. The same day he contributed £30 toward a fund authorized for the construction of a moveable fort (the Sea Fort) for the defence of the colony. Dummer and several other freemen in the colony were chosen as overseers of the powder and shot and all other ammunition in the several plantations where they lived. It was ordered that Dummer and John Johnson build a bridge over the Muddy River before the next General Court, and that the towns of Boston, Roxbury, Dorchester, New Town and Watertown contribute towards it.

Later in 1634, Dummer, with Richard Saltonstall, Henry Sewall and others in England (including Richard Dummer's brother Stephen and John Winthrop the Younger), contracted for the importation of large numbers of cattle. They had settled on the territory bordering on the Parker River as a suitable place for the keeping of the cattle because of the fertility of the upland and the large quantity of salt marsh, considered of special value for the forage.

In England a great body of people from the Hampshire Avon and Test valleys of all trades assembled at Southampton and London to sail in an initial convoy of 10 ships. The fleet left in 1634, arriving later the same year. Early in 1635 the Elizabeth arrived from London with Richard's sister Sarah, now married to John Brown. Other ships carried cattle. By the end of 1635 over 100 ships had made the journey, and Dummer's stock-raising colony was in being.

== Hampton ==
In March 1635, Dummer and John Spencer, came round in their shallop, came ashore at the landing at a spot known by the "Indians" as Winnicunnet and were much impressed by the location. Dummer, who was a member of the General Court, got that body to lay its claim to the section and plan a plantation here, at what was later to be the town of Hampton, New Hampshire. The Massachusetts General Court of 3 March 1636 ordered that Dummer and Spencer be given power to "To presse men to build there a Bound house".

Dummer was attracted to the area around Hampton by the abundance of salt marsh needed for the grazing of his cattle. Spencer was a partner in the cattle importation venture, and they "spotted what an asset to a prosperous settlement would be the several thousand acres of fine salt hay, just waiting to be cut or even fed off in pasture".

== Newbury ==
On 6 May 1635, a farm of 500 acres (200 ha) was allowed to Dummer at the falls in Newbury, and on 8 July, Dummer and Mr. Bartholomew were authorized to set out a convenient quantity of land within the bounds of Newbury for the keeping of sheep and cattle that were to come over in the Dutch ships that year and belong to the owners of those cattle.

Liberty was also granted to Dummer and to John Spencer to build a mill and weir at the falls at Newbury, to enjoy to them and their heirs forever.

Dummer ingratiated himself with the Governor of the Massachusetts Bay Colony, John Winthrop the Elder, and was appointed a member of the Governor's Council in 1635 and 1636. On 25 May 1636 he was elected Treasurer of the Colony, serving until 17 May 1637. He was a member of important committees of the council and was one of the two magistrates to hold the first Quarter Court at Ipswich in 1636.

== Puritanism ==
Governor Winthrop was a strict Puritan who set harsh rules to ensure compliance with Puritan principles. Others in the colony, such as Roger Williams, questioned Puritan rule including promoting women's rights. Williams believed in tolerance for others, including Quakers, Anglicans, Jewish and even Indian beliefs.

Dummer's wife, Mary, was a follower of Williams and Anne Hutchinson during the Antinomian Controversy, leading to her and Richard becoming banished to Boston. Soon after the birth of their son Shubael, Mary became ill and died in February 1636. The Revd. John Eliot said this of her later:

She was a Godly woman but by the seduction of her acquaintances she was led away into the new opinions in Mrs Hutchinson's time, and her husband removing to Newbury, she there declared herself and did also with others endeavours, seduce her husband and persuaded him to return to Boston, where she being young with child and ill; Mr. Clarke (one of the same opinions) unskillfully gave her a vomit, which did in such manner torture and torment her with the rising of the mouth, and other violences of nature, that she died in a most uncomfortable manner. But we believe God took her away in mercy from worse evil which she was falling into. We doubt not but she is gone to Heaven.

Of Dummer, Eliot said "no man more deserved the praise of doing well". Following Mary's death, Dummer, having been disenfranchised with many others as result of his support for Williams and Henry Vane, left the province and returned to Southampton.

== The Bevis ==
On his return to the family home at Bishopstoke, Dummer found his brothers packing and storing goods and provisions for their forthcoming journey to New England. At the time, there was political and religious unrest in England with the Puritan Parliament holding the purse strings to the frustration of King Charles.

The royalist High Sheriff, Sir John Oglander, kept his eye on happenings and noticing Richard's ship, the Bevis of Hampton, at anchor at Southampton, put a detention order on it while he investigated what was going on. He sent his men to search the homes of the Dummer brothers, John, Thomas and Stephen. Although they failed to turn up any contraband or evidence of tax evasion on exports, the searches did reveal the provision the family were making for their forthcoming voyage.

At John Dummer's house at Swaythling: six bushels of oatmeal and one brewstock of beer containing five bushels of malt, set aside for John's son Thomas.

At Thomas Dummer's house at Chickenhall, North Stoneham: one hogshead of beef, set aside for Richard and for Thomas's daughter Joan.

At Stephen Dummer's house at Townhill Park: two hogsheads of beef, five hogsheads of meal, four hogsheads of bacon and malt together, two barrels of beer and six cheeses set aside for Stephen Dummer's family and their servants and wards.

Nonetheless, the ship was allowed to sail and it departed for New England in May 1638 with nearly 70 people aboard, including: Richard, his brother Stephen, Stephen's wife Alice, and their children Jane aged 10, Dorothy aged 6, Richard aged 4, and Thomas aged 2; plus Thomas aged 19 the son of Richard's brother John, Joan aged 19 the daughter of Richard's brother Thomas, and ten servants to Stephen.

== Return to Newbury ==
On his return to New England, Dummer returned to Newbury where he had previously lived for a little over a year. He had been granted a 4-acre (16,000 m^{2}) house lot in the town lots and he also owned land on the Neck, which was afterwards purchased by Rowley when it became a plantation in 1639. In October 1638, Dummer purchased a dwelling house from Thomas Hale, with land on both sides of Merrimack Ridge. Here he lived for several years until he moved to the farm.

The mill that he was permitted to build was not finished until after 6 August 1638; on that date the selectmen of Newbury agreed that in case Richard Dummer "doe make his mill fit to grynd corne" they would send their grain to his mill and also "there shall not be another mill erected within the said town". Dummer received other grants of land until he was the owner of most of the uplands and marshes on the south side of the Parker River to the Rowley line, from Wheelers Brook above the falls of the Parker to the confluence of the Parker and Mill rivers at Oyster Point, except about 80 acres (32 ha) granted to Henry Sewall (the Hale Farm), and 100 acres (40 ha) granted to Dr. John Grant (the Buckley, Burnes, and Moynihan farms). Dummer's land embraced the farms later known as the Fatherland, Mrs. Sandford's, Walter Hill's, Ambrose Caldwell's, Coleman's, and most of the Noyes' farms, Capt. Knight's, and the Dummer Academy farms. On 7 October 1640, he bought from Thomas Mayhue of Watertown a farm of 500 acres (200 ha); the north-east corner of this farm he sold on 2 December 1640 to Richard Gale.

In 1643 or 1644, Dummer married again to Frances Burr, widow of Revd. Jonathon Burr of Dorchester who had died in August 1641. Her late husband had been a rector at Reckingshall in Suffolk, England, but when silenced by Archbishop Laud, had crossed to New England, where he was a colleague of Richard Mather at Dorchester. With Frances, Dummer had a further five children.

Dummer represented Newbury in the General Court of 1640–45 and again in 1647. He was elected Deputy for Salisbury in 1644 and was one of the Associate Justices of the Quarter Court at Ipswich in 1644 and again in 1671–72.

In 1650–51, he visited England to prove at the Prerogative Court of Canterbury the will of Thomas Nelson, husband of his niece Joane.

Dummer died in Newbury on 14 December 1679. His widow, Frances died on 12 November 1682, aged 70.

== Family ==
Dummer had six children:

- With Mary
  - Shubael (1636–1692), who founded the first Congregational church at York, Maine in 1672 and was killed by Abenakis in the Candlemas Massacre of 1692.
- With Frances
  - Jeremiah (1643–1718), who became the first American-born silversmith and was the father of William, who became Governor of the Province of Massachusetts Bay, and Jeremiah, who was involved in the foundation of Yale University.
  - Hannah (1647–1668), married Revd. James Allen, former Oxford undergraduate, in 1663. He was minister of the First Church, Boston. She died in March 1668, leaving no children.
  - Richard (1650–1689), who became a captain in the army at the age of 33 and a Justice of the Peace at 37.
  - Nathaniel (c.1652–1658), who drowned as a small boy when playing alone in a canoe.
  - William (1657–1678), who died of smallpox.

== Benevolence ==
In 1631, prior to his first going to New England, he settled a rent-charge of 40 shillings per annum, out of his lands in Bishopstoke, for the use of the poor of the parish at Michaelmas and Lady Day forever.

In 1640, Governor Winthrop became impoverished as a result of the dishonesty of his English agent, and an appeal was made to the generosity of the colonists. In the subscription that followed, Dummer made the largest contribution with a donation of £100, one fifth of the total, in spite of having suffered under Winthrop in earlier years.

Dummer's generosity was also noted when he paid the Indian "Old Will" £12 for 10 acres (4.0 ha) of land, far in excess of the fair market rate.
