= List of New Hampshire historical markers (101–125) =

- «76–100 126–150»

This page is one of a series of pages that list New Hampshire historical markers. The text of each marker is provided within its entry.

Contents
No.	Title	Location	Coordinates
101	Site of Wilder's Chair Factory	New Ipswich	42.78692°N 71.92638°W
102	Colonel John Goffe (1701–1786)	Bedford	42.95568°N 71.47867°W
103	Shapley Line	Seabrook	42.89721°N 70.8702°W
104	Ebenezer Mackintosh (1737–1816)	Haverhill	44.10611°N 72.03563°W
105	Mary Baker Eddy 1821–1910	Concord	43.19617°N 71.55876°W
106	Joel McGregor – Last Surviving Soldier of the Revolution	Newport	43.3895°N 72.18255°W
107	Colonial Grant	Hillsborough	43.116°N 71.95027°W
108	Bradford Center	Bradford	43.23719°N 71.9706°W
109	Lady Blanche House	Bartlett	44.08517°N 71.16569°W
110	Ratification of the Federal Constitution	Concord	43.21485°N 71.54152°W
111	Molly Stark House	Dunbarton	43.1494°N 71.62973°W
112	Hinsdale's Auto Pioneer	Hinsdale	42.78763°N 72.47405°W
113	Weeks House	Greenland	43.03654°N 70.84145°W
114	North Cemetery	Portsmouth	43.07881°N 70.76297°W
115	45th Parallel	Clarksville	44.99959°N 71.41943°W
116	College Road	Wolfeboro	43.61417°N 71.25798°W
117	General John Stark's expedition to Bennington – August 1777	Charlestown	43.23353°N 72.42402°W
118	Gilford – Commemorating a Revolutionary War Battle	Gilford	43.54977°N 71.40621°W
119	Old Landing Road	Hampton	42.93342°N 70.8356°W
120	Bound Rock	Hampton	42.89113°N 70.81368°W
121	Bath, New Hampshire	Bath	44.15958°N 71.96553°W
122	Mount Washington Hotel / Bretton Woods Monetary Conference	Carroll	44.25348°N 71.44878°W
123	The Governor's Road	Wakefield	43.52746°N 71.02626°W
124	Amoskeag Mills	Manchester	43.00106°N 71.4672°W
125	The Pierce Manse	Concord	43.21697°N 71.54499°W
Notes • References • External links

== Markers 101 to 125 ==
=== 101. Site of Wilder's Chair Factory ===
Town of New Ipswich

"In 1810, Peter Wilder, with his son-in-law Abijah Wetherbee, established the Wilder Chair Shop here in Wilder Village. Josiah P. Wilder and some of his brothers, sons of Peter, made over 25,000 spindle-back wooden seated chairs in forty or more designs. Stools, settees and rockers were also made here until the freshet of 1869 when the dam went out."

=== 102. Colonel John Goffe (1701–1786) ===
Town of Bedford

"This is considered to be the site of Colonel John Goffe's log dwelling. In 1744 Goffe built a gristmill on Bowman's Brook, later run by his son, Major John Goffe (1727-1813), and his grandson, Theodore Atkinson Goffe (1769-1860). The stream eventually powered several other mills. In 1939, Dr. George Woodbury (1902-1973), a Goffe descendant, built a mill that is now part of the hotel complex across the road, as told in his book, 'John Goffe's Mill.' Prominent in local history, Colonel Goffe lent his name to the neighboring Goffstown and Goffe's Falls. Four generations of Goffes lie nearby in Bedford's Old Burying Ground."

=== 103. Shapley Line ===
Town of Seabrook

"Based on the 1640 southern boundary of Bachiler's farm, it was surveyed by Capt. Nicholas Shapley in 1657, dividing the Province of New Hampshire from the Massachusetts Bay Colony from 1689-1741. In 1662 three Quaker women, being banished from the territory, were freed south of here by Constable Walter Barefoot. Edward Gove, imprisoned in the Tower of London for leading the rebellion against Lt. Gov. Cranfield in 1683 lived nearby."

=== 104. Ebenezer Mackintosh (1737–1816) ===
Town of Haverhill

"Born in Boston and a veteran of the 1758 Battle of Ticonderoga. As a known participant in the Boston Tea Party, (Note: Mackintosh claimed involvement in the Boston Tea Party, and although there is no direct evidence of this, researchers have opined "that he had a hand in the affair seems reasonably certain.") for his own and his children's safety, he walked to North Haverhill in early 1774. He later served in Northern Army under Gen. Gates in 1777. He was a shoemaker by trade and practiced his vocation here for the rest of his life. He is buried nearby in Horse Meadows Cemetery."

=== 105. Mary Baker Eddy 1821–1910 ===
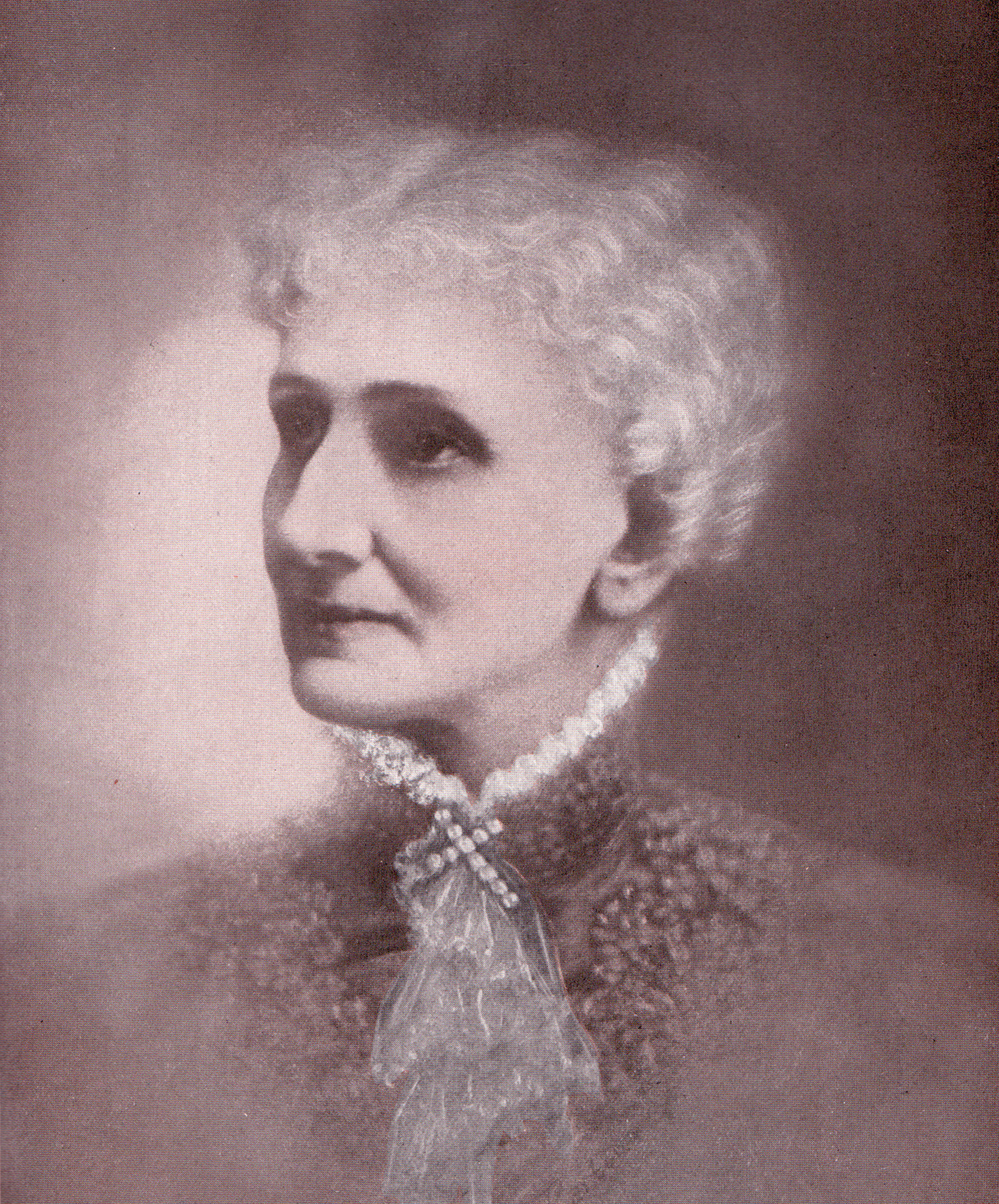
Mary Baker Eddy in her later years

City of Concord

"While living at her 'Pleasant View' home (1892-1908) once on this site, Mrs. Eddy founded The First Church of Christ, Scientist, in Boston, Mass., headquarters of the Christian Science movement. From 'Pleasant View', some six miles from her birthplace in Bow, she guided its worldwide activities and gained fame as a religious leader and writer. The buildings erected on this site in 1927 served as a home for retired Christian Science practitioners and nurses until 1975."

Note: this marker was erected in 1976.

=== 106. Joel McGregor – Last Surviving Soldier of the Revolution ===
Town of Newport

"Born in Enfield, Conn. in 1760, Joel McGregor enlisted in 1777 and served five years. Taken prisoner by the British, he was confined eight months in the famous OLD SUGAR HOUSE in New York City. He settled in Newport in 1789 and was a resident for 72 years, dying October 31, 1861 at the age of 101. He is believed to have been New Hampshire's last surviving soldier of the Revolution."

Note: this marker was erected in 1976.

=== 107. Colonial Grant ===
Town of Hillsborough

"In 1769, Col. John Hill, a Masonian proprietor, 'granted forever' a tract of land in and around this triangle plot to the first settled minister, Rev. Jonathan Barnes, providing locations for the church, meetinghouse, minister's homestead, school, pound, training field, and burying ground. Worthy of note is that descendants of the original grantee still occupy many of these 18th and early 19th century homes."

=== 108. Bradford Center ===
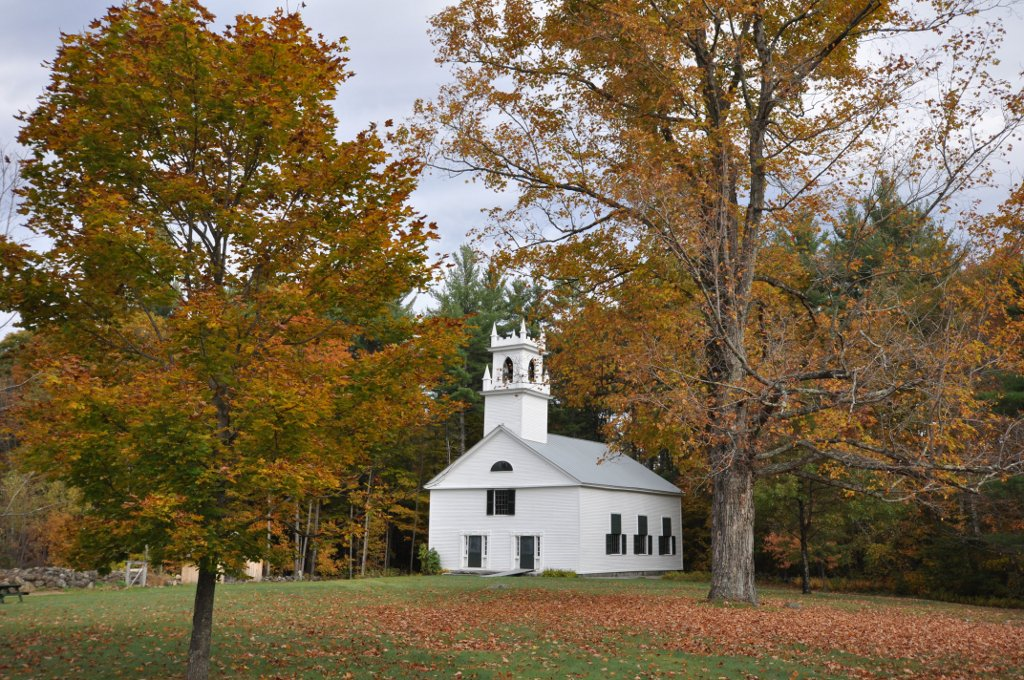
Bradford Center Meetinghouse

Town of Bradford

"This Common, designated the geographical center of the town in 1791, at one time was bordered by the Town Pound, constructed in 1789, the existing District One School, built in 1793, and the still-standing Congregational Society Meeting House, dedicated in 1838. This also marks the site of the first Meeting House in the Town of Bradford. Erected in 1797, it was dismantled in 1863, moved to Bradford Village and re-erected at the Town Hall site."

=== 109. Lady Blanche House ===
Town of Bartlett

"This rustic cottage was once the home of Thomas Murphy and his wife, Lady Blanche, daughter of the Earl of Gainsborough. Thomas was the organist at the church on the Earl's estate. The commoner and lady eloped to America, where Thomas taught at the Kearsarge School for Boys in North Conway. Lady Blanche, a noted writer and contributor to such publications as Harper's and the Atlantic Monthly, died here in 1881."

=== 110. Ratification of the Federal Constitution ===
City of Concord

"The convention of delegates from 175 New Hampshire towns took place on June 21, 1788 in the Old North Meeting House which stood on this site from 1751 until destroyed by fire in 1870. The delegates approved the Federal Constitution by majority vote. New Hampshire, the ninth state to ratify this historic document, thereby assured its adoption."

=== 111. Molly Stark House ===
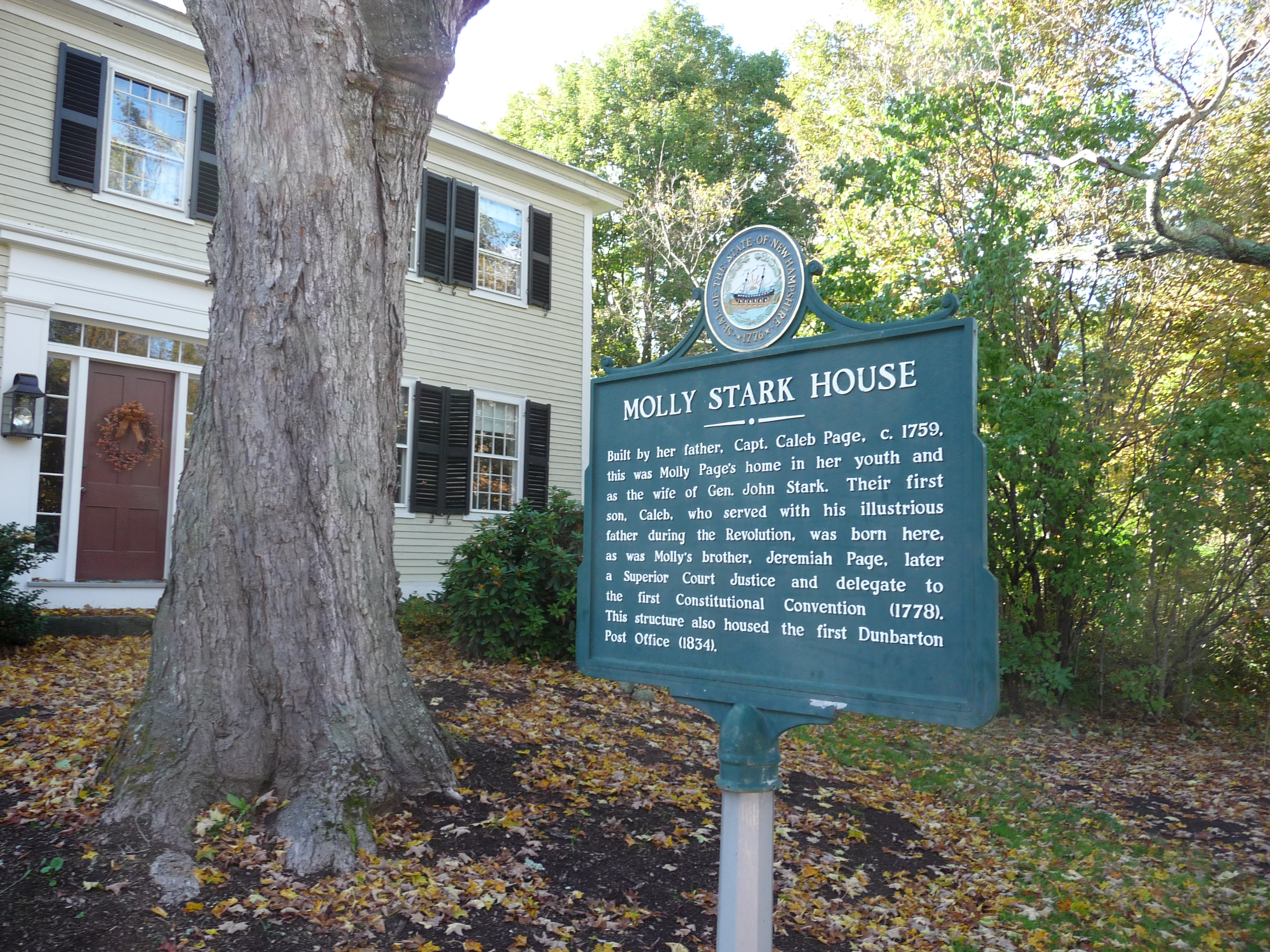
Molly Stark House historical marker

Town of Dunbarton

"Built by her father, Capt. Caleb Page, c. 1759, this was Molly Page's home in her youth and as the wife of Gen. John Stark. Their first son, Caleb, who served with his illustrious father during the Revolution, was born here, as was Molly's brother Jeremiah Page, later a Superior Court Justice and delegate to the first Constitutional Convention (1778). (Note: Jeremiah Page was selected to attend the State Convention of 1778, held in Concord.) This structure also housed the first Dunbarton Post Office (1834)."

=== 112. Hinsdale's Auto Pioneer ===
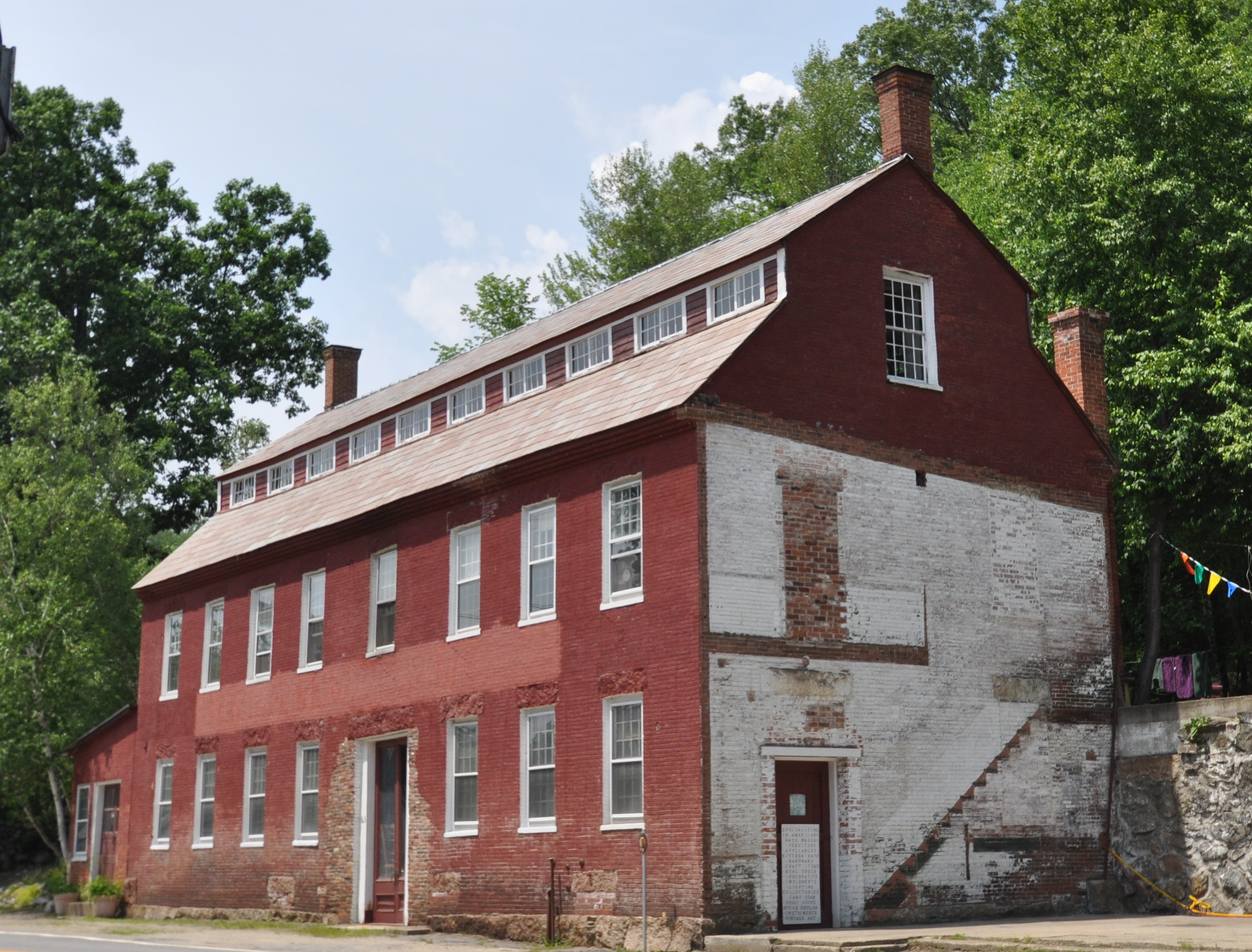
Holman & Merriman Machine Shop in Hinsdale

Town of Hinsdale

"In the Holman and Merriman Machine Shop opposite this location, George A. Long of Northfield (Mass.) in 1875 built a steam-propelled four wheel automobile with a fifth wheel for steering. This vehicle, fired by hardwood charcoal, had a bicycle-type frame, ordinary wooden wheels, solid rear axle and could maintain 30 miles per hour, roads permitting. This early inventor patented and built another automobile, propelled by gasoline, now in the Smithsonian Institution."

Note: this marker was erected in 1976.

=== 113. Weeks House ===
Town of Greenland

"Leonard Weeks settled here in 1658 on 33 acres of land which he left to his son Samuel, who built the house about 1710. The bricks were made on the premises. Hand hewn oak beams support the 18-inch thick walls, which were cracked by the earthquake of 1755. Occupied by the family over 250 years, it is considered the oldest native brick house in New Hampshire."

=== 114. North Cemetery ===
City of Portsmouth

"The Town of Portsmouth purchased this land in 1753 for 150 pounds from Col. John Hart, commander of the N.H. Regiment at Louisburg. General William Whipple, Signer of the Declaration of Independence, Gov. John Langdon, Signer of the Constitution, Capt. Thomas Thompson, of the Continental Ship Raleigh, are among noted citizens buried here."

=== 115. 45th Parallel ===
Town of Clarksville (45°00′N 71°24′W)

"At this point you stand on the 45th parallel halfway between the Equator and the North Pole. At this point you stand also at longitude 71° 24' West from Greenwich, England. A line from this point through the center of the earth would emerge in the Indian Ocean 982 miles southwest of Perth, Australia." (Note: The coordinates of "a line from this point through the center of the earth" correspond to 45°00′S 71°24′E, which appears to be approximately 2,500 miles (4,000 km) from Perth and approximately 300 miles (480 km) north of the Kerguelen Islands.)

=== 116. College Road ===
Town of Wolfeboro

"Governor John Wentworth and the King's Council voted in the spring of 1771 that a highway be made from the Governor's estate at Wolfeborough to Dartmouth College. Joseph Senter, David Copp and Samuel Shepard surveyed the 67-mile road which followed this route to Plymouth. Thence it passed through Groton, around Lary's and Goose Ponds, over Moose Mountain to Hanover. Wentworth rode over it to Dartmouth's first commencement, August 28, 1771."

Note: this marker was erected in 1977.

=== 117. General John Stark's expedition to Bennington – August 1777 ===
Town of Charlestown

"To impede a British invasion from Canada into eastern New York, the New Hampshire legislature, on July 19, 1777, commissioned John Stark of Derryfield to recruit and lead a force of 1500 New Hampshire militiamen. At Charlestown's Fort No. 4, forces were assembled with food, medical supplies and military stores. On August 3, they marched west and, in the famed Battle of Bennington on August 16, they defeated the combined British-German forces, thereby achieving a major turning point of the war."

=== 118. Gilford – Commemorating a Revolutionary War Battle ===
Town of Gilford

"Gilford, the center of which is opposite this location, is the only New Hampshire town named for a Revolutionary War battle, the 1781 Battle of Guilford Court House in North Carolina. After the war, Lt. Lemuel B. Mason, a New Hampshire officer who served in that battle, retired to Gilmanton. In 1812, when the town was divided, as its oldest and most famous citizen, he was accorded the honor of choosing a name for the new town."

=== 119. Old Landing Road ===
Town of Hampton

"This was the first roadway from the ancient landing on Hampton River taken on October 14, 1638, by Rev. Stephen Bachiler and his small band of followers, when they made the first settlement of Hampton, originally named Winnacunnet Plantation. For the next 160 years this area was the center of the Town's activity. During that period and into the Town's third century, Landing Road provided access for fishing, salt-marsh haying, mercantile importing and exporting, and transportation needs of a prospering community."

=== 120. Bound Rock ===
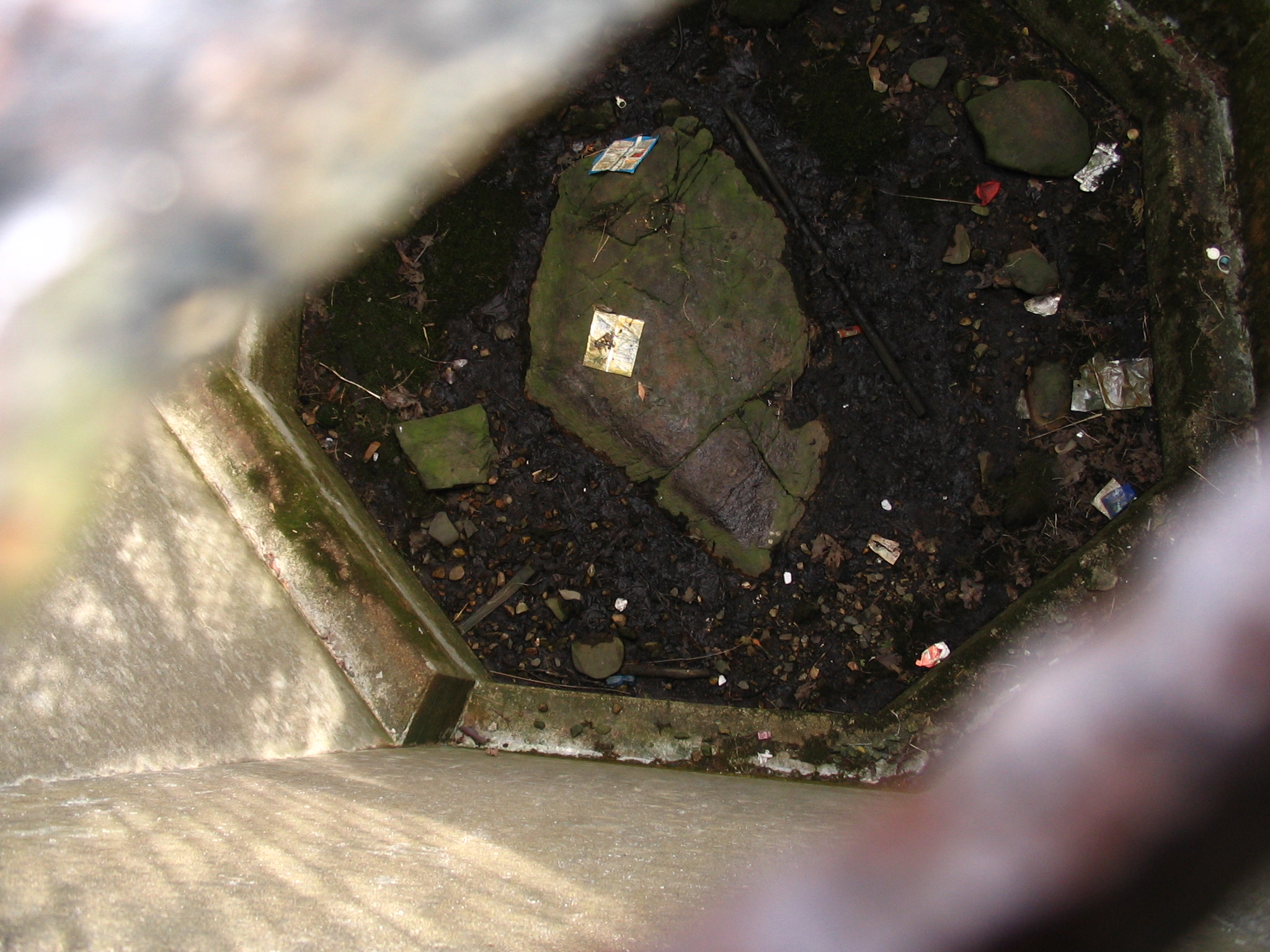
Bound Rock in Hampton (viewed from above)

Town of Hampton

"This rock, originally in the middle of the Hampton River, indicated the start of the boundary line surveyed by Capt. Nicholas Shapley and marked by him 'AD 1657-HB and SH' to determine the line between Hampton and Salisbury, HB meaning Hampton Bound and SH, Shapley's mark. Lost for many decades due to the shifting of the river's mouth, the original course of the river and the Bound Rock were rediscovered in 1937. (Note: Newspapers of the era indicate that Bound Rock was rediscovered in 1931.) This historically important boulder, still serving as a boundary marker, was enclosed by the State of New Hampshire that same year."

=== 121. Bath, New Hampshire ===
Town of Bath

"Settled in 1766 by Jaasiel Harriman whose cabin was near the Great Rock. His nine-year-old daughter Mercy carried dirt in her apron to the top of this unique rock formation. Here she planted corn, pumpkins, and cucumbers, making the first garden in town. Three well-preserved covered bridges are to be found here. Among its many fine homes is the Federal mansion built by Moses P. Payson in 1810."

Note: this marker was erected in 1978.

=== 122. Mount Washington Hotel / Bretton Woods Monetary Conference ===
Town of Carroll

This marker has different text on each side:

"Standing to the east, the Mount Washington Hotel was completed in 1902 as one of the largest, most modern grand hotels in the White Mountains, one of the few built in a single campaign. Designed by New York architect Charles Alling Gifford (1861-1937), the hotel was financed by Concord, N.H. native Joseph Stickney (1840-1903), an industrialist who had purchased 10,000 acres here in 1881. Served by as many as 57 trains a day, the Mount Washington Hotel became known as one of the most luxurious summer resorts in the United States. It was designated a National Historic Landmark in 1986."

"This site in the town of Carroll, named 'Bretton Woods' in 1903 to recall the original land grant of 1772, was chosen in July 1944 as the location of one of the most important meetings of the 20th century. Convened by the allied nations before the end of WWII and attended by representatives of 44 countries, the Bretton Woods Conference established regulations for the international monetary system following the war. The conference created the International Monetary Fund and the future World Bank, and linked the exchange rate of world currencies to the value of gold."

Note: this marker was erected in 1978. The text about Bretton Woods has been revised at least once; the text listed above has been in place since at least 2009. (Note: As of 1993, the text was: "In 1944 the United States government chose the Mount Washington Hotel as the side for a gathering of representatives of 44 countries. This was to be the famed Bretton Woods Monetary Conference. The conference established the World Bank, set the gold standard at $35 an ounce, and chose the American dollar as the backbone of international exchange. The meeting provided the world with a badly needed post war currency stability.")

=== 123. The Governor's Road ===
Town of Wakefield

Location: NH 16 south of NH 109

"The name was given to the highway from Portsmouth to Governor John Wentworth's summer estate in Wolfeborough. Passing through Newington, it crossed the Piscataqua River at Knight's Ferry to Dover. From Rochester it skirted Teneriffe Mountain to Middleton Four Corners. Rounding Moose Mountain to Union Meadows it passed through Brookfield, arriving at Wentworth House. The fifty mile highway was completed in 1769."

=== 124. Amoskeag Mills ===
City of Manchester

"Samuel Blodgett began a canal to bypass the steep falls in 1793, with money provided by a lottery. The canal was finished in 1807. Mills then sprang up on both sides of the river below the falls. The world-renowned Amoskeag Manufacturing Company flourished here for a century, operating 64 mills, covering a mile and a half of ground, housing 700,000 spindles and 23,000 looms which turned out 500,000 yards of cloth each week."

Note: this marker was erected in 1978.

=== 125. The Pierce Manse ===
City of Concord

"One tenth of a mile east of here stands the only house in Concord owned (1842-1848) by Franklin Pierce, 14th President of the United States. Removed to this site in 1971 from Montgomery Street it was restored by the Pierce Brigade. Opened to the public in 1974, it is now an important tourist attraction."

Note: this marker was erected in 1978.
