= Bradford Center Meetinghouse =

Historic church in New Hampshire, United States

- U.S. National Register of Historic Places
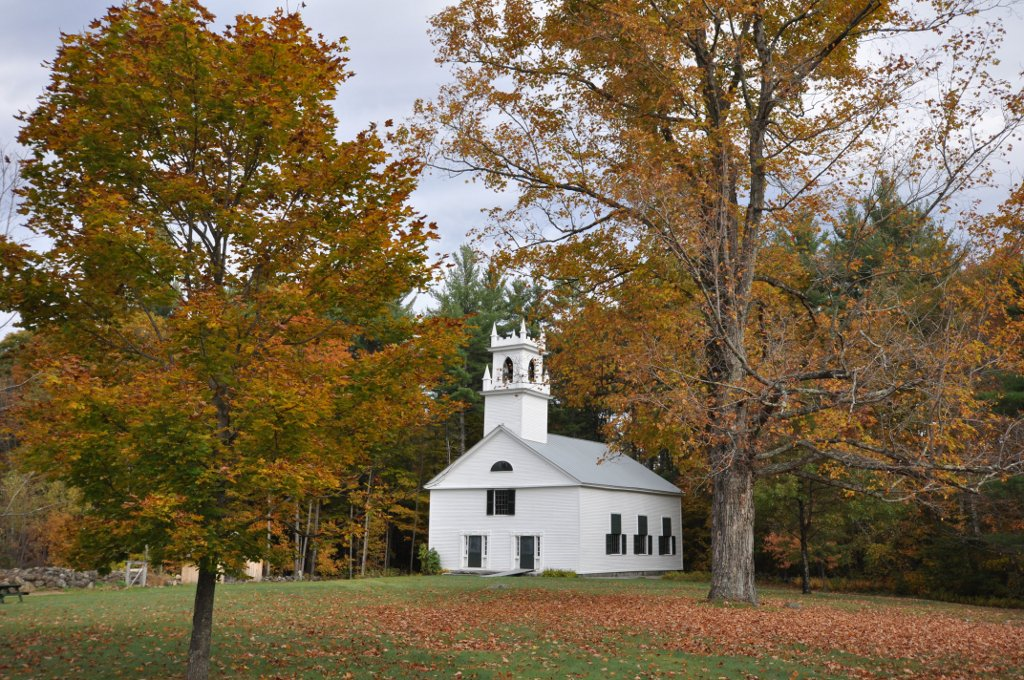

- Location within New Hampshire Location within the United States
- Location: 18 Rowe Mountain Road, Bradford, New Hampshire
- Coordinates: 43°14′10″N 71°58′8″W
- Area: less than one acre
- Built: 1838
- Architectural style: Greek Revival
- NRHP reference No.: 13000384
- Added to NRHP: June 14, 2013

The Bradford Center Meetinghouse is a historic church at 18 Rowe Mountain Road in Bradford, New Hampshire. Built in 1838 in what was then the town center, it is a well-preserved example of rural Greek Revival church architecture. The meetinghouse was listed on the National Register of Historic Places in 2013.

== Description and history ==
The Bradford Center Meetinghouse stands in what is now an out-of-the-way location south of the modern town center, on the north side of Rowe Mountain Road a short way east of its junction with Center, West and County Roads. It is set among other trappings of the early town center: a grassy common and the town's first cemetery. The building is a typical rural 19th-century New England church, a wood-frame building resting on a granite foundation. The front facade of the church features a pair of doorways, each flanked by sidelight windows and pilasters supporting an entablature. A single 12/8 window is centered above the doorways, while the side walls each have three 20/20 windows. The tower has a belfry supported by eight columns, and still houses the original 1838 bell. Both the interior and exterior have experienced only relatively modest changes since the building's construction.

The Greek Revival church was built in 1838, in response to state legislation mandating the separation of church and state. The town's first meetinghouse, built in 1796, had been used for both religious and civic purposes; it would later be dismantled and moved to a location nearer the railroad tracks, where it now serves as the Bradford Town Hall.

== See also ==
- National Register of Historic Places listings in Merrimack County, New Hampshire
- New Hampshire Historical Marker No. 108: Bradford Center
