= Holman & Merriman Machine Shop =

- Derby Shop/Goodnow Pail Factory/Holman & Merriman Machine Shop/L. A. Carpenter Machine Shop/Streeter Shop
- U.S. National Register of Historic Places
- NH State Register of Historic Places
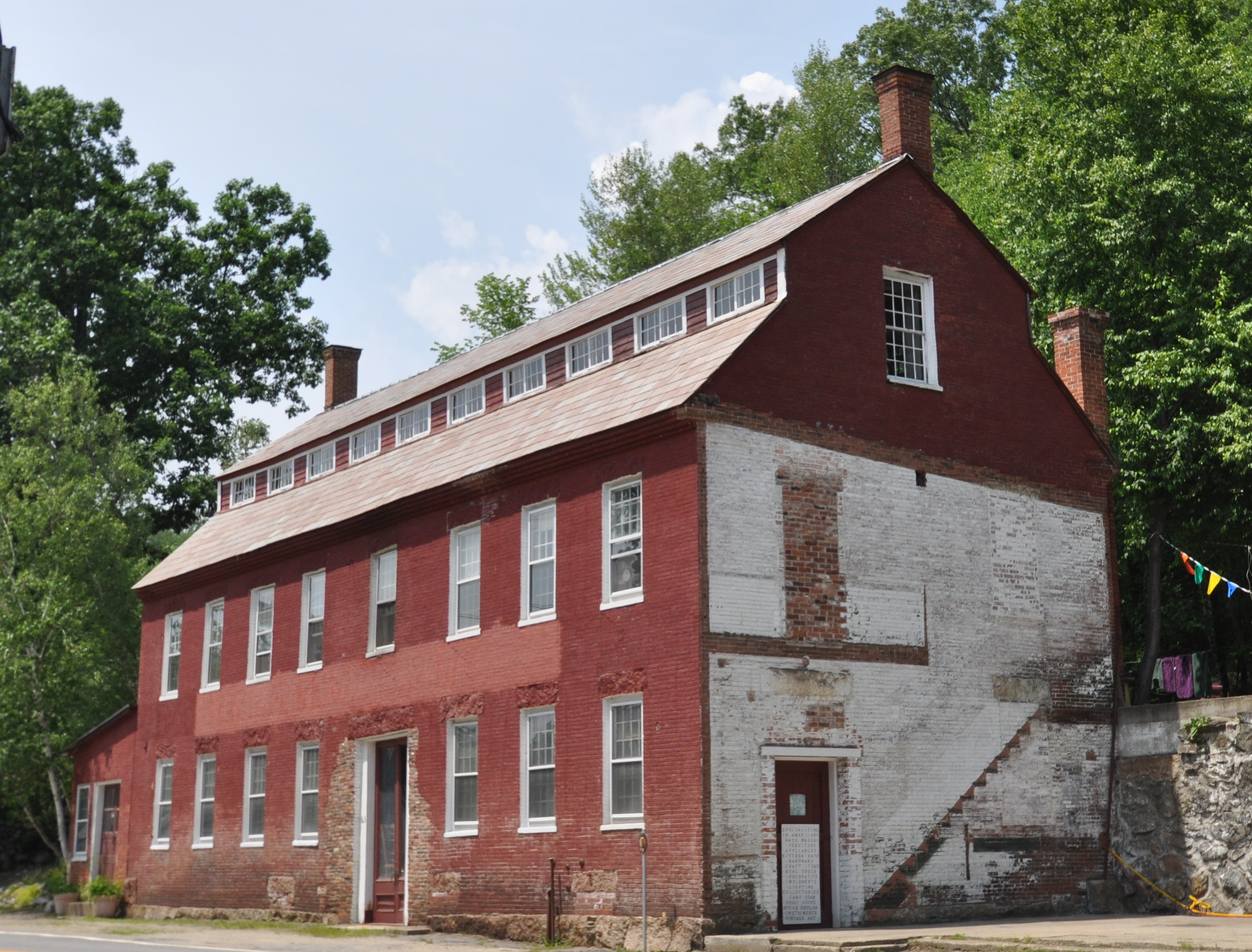

- Location within New Hampshire Location within the United States
- Location: 63 Canal St., Hinsdale, New Hampshire
- Coordinates: 42°47′17″N 72°28′30″W
- Area: 0.7 acres (0.28 ha)
- Built: 1837
- Architectural style: Factory with clerestory roof
- NRHP reference No.: 07001260

Significant dates
- Added to NRHP: December 11, 2007
- Designated NHSRHP: January 29, 2007

The Holman & Merriman Machine Shop, also known as the Derby Shop, Goodnow Pail Factory, L. A. Carpenter Machine Shop, and Streeter Shop, is an historic industrial building at 63 Canal Street in Hinsdale, New Hampshire. This three-story brick building, built in 1837, is the only building with a clerestory roof in Hinsdale, and one of only four in the state. It is also distinctive as the only known example in the state of a building purpose-built as a large-scale cooperage. The building was listed on the National Register of Historic Places in December 2007, and the New Hampshire State Register of Historic Places in January 2007.

== Description and history ==
The former Holman & Merriman Machine Shop is located on the eastern fringe of the village of Hinsdale, on the north side of Canal Street (New Hampshire Route 119). It is set close to the road, and was historically flanked to the north by an industrial power canal, since filled in. It is built into a granite ledge, presenting three stories to the street and two to the back. It is built of brick, with granite trim, and a gabled roof that has a row of clerestory windows midway between the ridge and cornice. The main facade is eight bays wide, with the entrance in one of the central bays. A shed-roof wood-frame ell extends to the left.

The shop was built in 1837 by Joel Derby, for use as a cooperage, and was sited to take advantage of the water power provided by the canal (opened in 1828). In its basement, the wheel pit and tail race survive from its period of water-powered use. The building's clerestory windows provided ample natural light, and were a building technique that enabled the construction of larger industrial buildings prior to the introduction of artificial lighting. Only three other clerestory roofs are known to survive in the state. The building saw a variety of industrial uses until 1991, including manufacturers of pails, sewing machines, and industrial mill parts. It was also here that George Long, a resident of nearby Northfield, Massachusetts, built a vehicle propelled by a coal-fired steam engine.

== See also ==
- National Register of Historic Places listings in Cheshire County, New Hampshire
- New Hampshire Historical Marker No. 112: Hinsdale's Auto Pioneer
