= Bill Cowell =

Australian rules footballer

Personal information
- Full name: John William Joseph Cowell
- Born: 19 February 1887; Heidelberg, Victoria
- Died: 13 March 1956 (aged 69); Coburg, Victoria
- Original team: Mordialloc

Playing career^{1}
Years	Club	Games (Goals)
1905	St Kilda	9 (4)
- ^{1} Playing statistics correct to the end of 1905.

John William Joseph Cowell (19 February 1887 – 13 March 1956) was an Australian rules footballer who played with St Kilda in the Victorian Football League (VFL).

== Death ==
He died at his residence in West Coburg on 13 March 1956.
