= Christopher Hussey (died 1686) =

English colonial official

Member of the Massachusetts General Court representing Hampton
- In office 1658–1660
- Preceded by: Robert Page
- Succeeded by: William Fuller
- In office 1672–1672
- Preceded by: Samuel Dalton
- Succeeded by: Samuel Dalton

Personal details
- Born: 1599 Dorking, Surrey, England
- Died: 1686 (aged 86–87) Hampton, New Hampshire, British America
- Occupation: Colonial official, Landowner
- Known for: Initial settler in New England

Captain Christopher Hussey (1599–1686) was a moderate English Puritan colonial official and initial settler of Hampton, New Hampshire and Nantucket in New England. He served mostly in town positions, but was appointed by the Crown to be a member of the New Hampshire Executive Council in 1679. He was also a deacon of the First Congregational Church in Hampton, serving under his father-in-law Stephen Bachiler.

== Early Life and Arrival in New England ==
Christopher Hussey was born in Dorking, Surrey, England, in 1599 to John and Mary Hussey (née Wood).

At some point in his youth, he went to Holland where he spent time with the group of English non-conformists living there. While in Holland, he courted Theodate Bachiler, who was the daughter of Puritan minister Stephen Bachiler. Bachiler would only consent to their marriage if Hussey would agree to move to New England with him. He agreed and he and Theodate were married in 1629.

Keeping his promise, Hussey, his wife, and his widowed mother traveled to New England on the ship William and Francis, arriving at Charlestown, Massachusetts in 1630, and settling in Saugus (now Lynn, Massachusetts). Hussey's son, Stephen, became the first English child baptized in Lynn.

When Bachiler had to leave Lynn in 1636, he settled in Newbury, Massachusetts and Hussey, his wife, and mother joined him. It is possible that Bachiler had to move because he cast the only dissenting vote against the banishment of Roger Williams.

== Career ==
By 1638, Bachiler had to move again and Hussey willingly followed him north to Winnacunnet, where he purchased land. Hussey, his mother, and Bachiler successfully petitioned Massachusetts to incorporate a town in Winnacunnet in 1639. They named the town Hampton which was incorporated into Norfolk County, Massachusetts Colony. Bachiler began a church there and Hussey was his deacon. He was appointed to his first political office, becoming the Commissioner for Small Causes in 1639 in which he adjudicated financial disputes under 20s.

In 1650, Hussey stepped down from his role as deacon so he could join the militia. He became a lieutenant in 1653 and a captain in 1664.

=== Deputy to the General Court ===
Hussey was elected to the Massachusetts General Court in 1658 and served for three one-year terms and then again in 1672. While he was in office, Massachusetts passed a law requiring the death penalty for being a Quaker. Given his close affiliation with Reverend Bachiler and that he purchased Nantucket with 8 men who held Quaker sympathies, Hussey was probably a dissenting vote against the death penalty bill.

=== Proprietorship of Nantucket ===
Hussey was one of the original proprietors of Nantucket, Massachusetts, becoming a landowner there in 1659. He, along with 8 other moderate Puritan men of Norfolk County, Massachusetts Colony purchased the land from Thomas Mayhew for thirty pounds and two beaver hats.

Notably, after securing the land rights from Mayhew, the proprietors signed a treaty with the Native Americans to secure the land rights from them.

There is no record of Hussey ever visiting Nantucket, but his son Stephen Hussey settled there on his father's property and become a prominent member of Nantucket society.

=== Quaker Admonishment ===
He was fined and admonished for attending a Quaker meeting in 1674.

== Appointment to the Royal Council ==
In 1679, he was appointed by name in the Commission of John Cutt to be a member of the Executive Council of the newly created Province of New Hampshire. He was appointed along with Richard Waldron, Thomas Daniel, William Vaughan, Richard Martyn, and John Gilman.

After John Cutt died in 1681, Edward Cranfield was appointed by King Charles II to replace him, arriving in New Hampshire in October 1682. Hussey was not mentioned in the new commission as a member of the council. This is presumed to be his retirement from active politics.

However, he last appears as a name on a petition to the king in 1685 asking for relief against the excesses of Cranfield's administration.

He died in March 1686. Contrary to what was reported in Jeremy Belknap's The History of New-Hampshire, Hussey did not die shipwrecked off the coast of Florida, but rather peacefully in Hampton.

== Family and Legacy ==
=== Family ===
He married Theodate Bachiler in 1629 and they had 5 children. Stephen was born in 1632, John in 1635, Mary in 1638, Theodate in 1640 and Huldah in 1643.

After his wife Theodate died, he married the widow Ann Mingay of Hampton in 1658.

=== Legacy ===
Christopher Hussey's father was reportedly descended from John Hussey, 1st Baron Hussey of Sleaford, by first wife Margaret Blount. Lord Hussey was beheaded by King Henry VIII in 1537 for treason. The New England Historic Genealogical Society, however, say that his descent from noble houses "seems highly unlikely".

Christopher Hussey's direct descendant is Thomas Markle, father of Meghan, Duchess of Sussex.
