= William Cowell Sr. =

American silversmith (1682–1736)

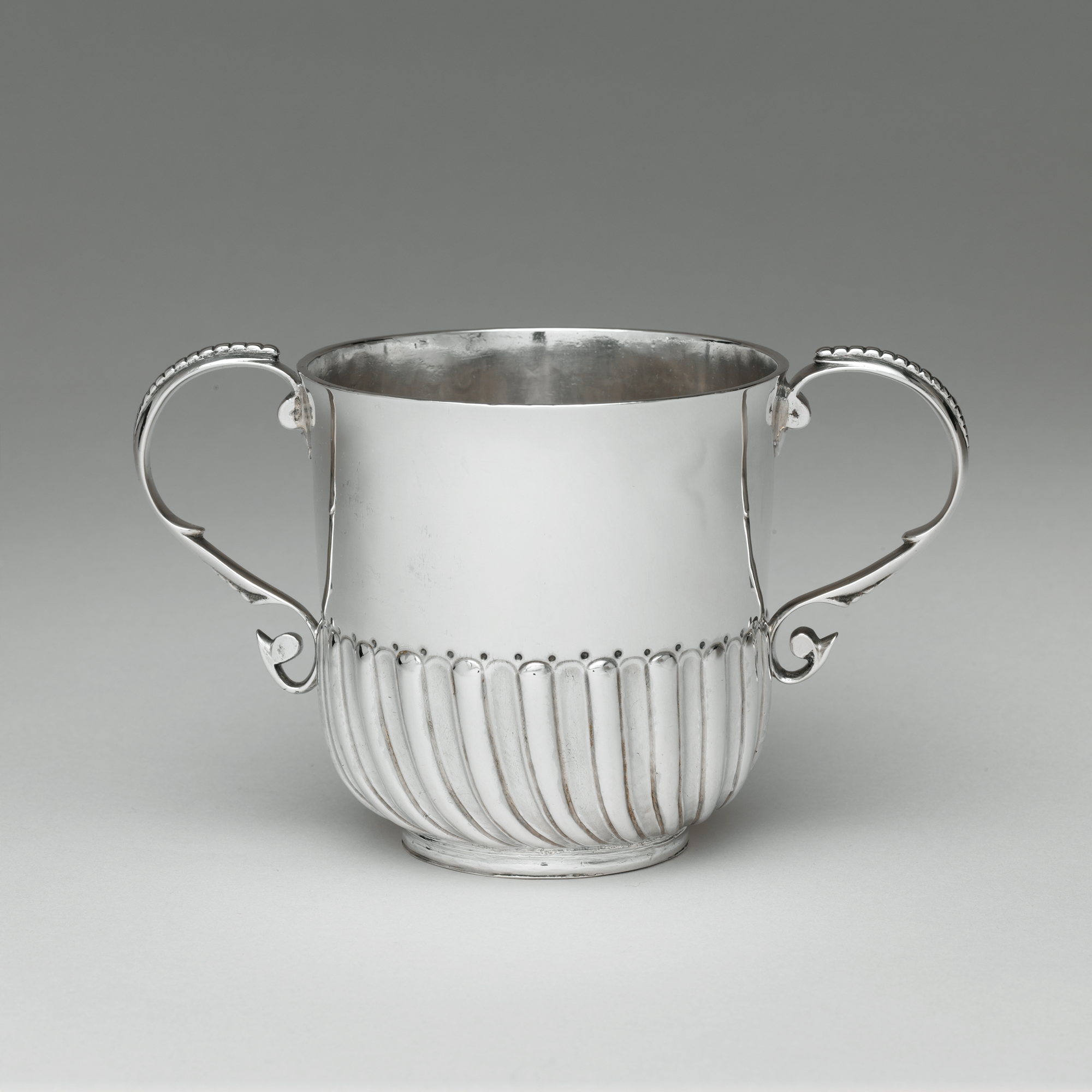
Cup by William Cowell Sr., 1705–1715

William Cowell Sr. (January 25, 1682 – 1736) was a silversmith active in Boston in the Thirteen Colonies.

Cowell was born in Boston, and may have apprenticed with John Allen (1671/72 – 1760), John Edwards (about 1671 – 1746), or Jeremiah Dummer. By 1704 his apprenticeship was complete, and on May 13, 1706, he married Elizabeth Kilby. Samuel Sewall's diary records that in 1707 Cowell's shop was burgled "and a considerable quantity of Plate stolen," although the stolen silver was returned after the thief was apprehended. Seward later records, in 1715, that he hired a horse from Cowell, which is consistent with the profession of "innkeeper" recorded at Cowell's death. He is believed to have retired about 1734 when his son, William Cowell Jr., finished his apprenticeship.

Cowell's work is collected in the Museum of Fine Arts Boston, Metropolitan Museum of Art, Art Institute of Chicago, and Yale University Art Gallery.

== Notes ==
- "Tankard by William Cowell Sr.", Museum of Fine Arts Boston.
- Early American Silver in The Metropolitan Museum of Art, Beth Carver Wees, Medill Higgins Harvey, Metropolitan Museum of Art, 2013, page 133.
- American Silver in the Art Institute of Chicago, Art Institute of Chicago, Yale University Press, 2016, page 64.
- "William Cowell", American Silversmiths.
