= Stephen Bachiler =

English clergyman (1561–1656)

- Born: 1561
- Died: 1656 (aged 94–95) near London, England
- Occupation: Clergyman
- Known for: Establishing settlements in New Hampshire
- Spouse(s): Ann Bates (m. circa 1590–before 1623); Christian Weare (m. 1623–before 1627); Helena Mason (m.1627); Mary Beedle (m.1648)
- Children: 6
- Relatives: Christopher Hussey (son in law)

Stephen Bachiler (About 1561 – 28 October 1656) was an English clergyman who was an early proponent of the separation of church and state in the American Colonies. He was also among the first settlers of Hampton, New Hampshire.

== Early life ==
Bachiler was born about 1560 or 1561; he matriculated at Oxford University 17 November 1581, when it is believed he was 20. Also called age 70 on 23 June 1631 when he made a trip to Flushing, Zeeland, to visit family. An early graduate of Oxford (St. John's College, 1586), he was vicar of Wherwell, Hampshire (1587–1605) when ousted for Puritanical leanings under James I. Bachiler is said to have married Ann (no evidence of surname), who was possibly (no proof has been found) a sister of Rev. John Bates (who succeeded Bachiler as Vicar at Wherwell), about 1590, with whom he had six children: Nathaniel, Deborah, Stephen, Samuel, Ann, and Theodate, who later married Christopher Hussey (1599–1686), also one of the earliest settlers of New Hampshire.

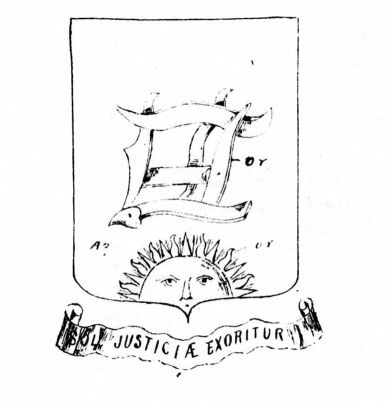
Bachiler coat-of-arms

Bachiler had a second marriage to Christian Weare, widow, in 1623. She died before 1627. His third marriage, in 1627, was to Helena Mason, the widow of Revd. Thomas Mason of Odiham, Hampshire; Mary, the daughter of Helena and Thomas Mason, was married to Richard Dummer, who also became involved in the founding of the Plough Company.

== Plough Company and immigration ==
In 1630 he was a member of the Company of Husbandmen in London and with them, as the Plough Company, obtained a 1,600 mile² (4,000 km²) grant of land in Maine from the Plymouth Council for New England. The colony was called "Lygonia" after Cecily Lygon, mother of New England Council president Sir Ferdinando Gorges. Bachiler was to be its minister and leader. Although the settlers sailed to America in the winter of 1630–1631, the project was abandoned. The plough (Note: U.S. spelling, "plow") and the image of a sun rising from its base feature on Bachiler's coat-of-arms which were included in a 1661 work on the origins of heraldry by Sylvanus Morgan.

Bachiler was accompanied to America, on the ship William & Francis (5 June 1632) after an 88-day journey, by his third wife, Helena and his "family". Exactly who came with Rev. Bachiler is unknown. The families of his children Nathaniel, Deborah, Ann & Theodate are all later found in New England.

== Lynn and Newbury, Massachusetts ==
Bachiler was 70 years old when he reached Boston in 1632, and gathered his followers to establish the First Church of Lynn (then Saugus). He incurred the hostility of the Puritan theocracy in Boston, being believed to have cast the only dissenting vote among ministers against the expulsion of Roger Williams. Despite his age, he was uncommonly energetic, and throughout some two decades pursued settlement and church endeavors, always engaged in controversy and confrontation with Bay Colony leaders.

By 1636, Bachiler had moved to Newbury, Massachusetts, with his son-in-law Captain Christopher Hussey. The men were following their cousin Richard Dummer who had taken up a large farm. Bachiler and Hussey like-wise received similar grants of land.

== Hampton, New Hampshire ==
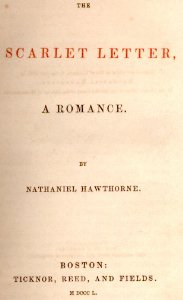

In 1638, Bachiler and others, including his son-in-law Christopher Hussey, successfully petitioned to begin a new plantation at Winnacunnet, to which he gave the name Hampton when the town was incorporated in 1639. His ministry there became embroiled in controversy when Timothy Dalton was sent to the town as "teaching assistant" by the Boston church after New Hampshire was absorbed by Massachusetts in 1641. Shortly thereafter, Bachiler was excommunicated by the Hampton church on unfounded charges of "scandal", but protested to Governor Winthrop and was later reinstated. In other respects, Bachiler's reputation was such that in 1642, he was asked by Thomas Gorges, deputy governor of the Province of Maine, to act as arbitration "umpire" (deciding judge) in a Saco Court land dispute between George Cleeve and John Winter.

== Maine ==
By 1644, Cleeve had become deputy governor of Lygonia, a rival province to that of Gorges' in Maine established from a resurrected Plough Patent, and asked Bachiler to be its minister at Casco. Bachiler deferred, having already received a call to be minister for the new town of Exeter. Once again Massachusetts intervened in his affairs when the General Court ordered deferral of any church at Exeter. Frustrated in his attempts at a new ministry, Bachiler left Hampton and went as missionary to Strawbery Banke (now Portsmouth, New Hampshire) probably that same year 1644. While there, he married in 1648 (his fourth wife) a young widow, Mary Beedle of Kittery, Maine. In 1651, she was indicted and sentenced for adultery with a neighbor. There are scholars who believe that she was the model of the character of Hester Prynne in The Scarlet Letter.

== Emigration to England and death ==
All Hallows Staining, England

Denied a divorce by the Massachusetts Court, Bachiler finally returned to England about 1653. His children who had stayed in England were well off and able to take care of him. Bachiler died near London, and the burial register of All Hallows Staining records that he was buried on 31 October 1656 at the New Churchyard.

== Legacy ==
The biographical entry in Robert Charles Anderson's look at the early immigrants says of Bachiler: "Among the many remarkable lives lived by early New Englanders, Bachiler's is the most remarkable." The Metropolitan Museum of Art in New York holds the (Bachiler-Hussey) Joined armchair, dated 1650–1700. The chair was possibly commissioned prior to Bachiler's voyage back to England and is made from white oak. Bachiler's son-in-law, Captain Christopher Hussey acquired the chair when Bachiler, "gave him (Hussey) all of his estate"; this was owing to the absence of any dowry accompanying Theodate Hussey, Bachiler's daughter. The chair subsequently remained in Bachiler's family for generations, being given to the museum in 2010.

== See also ==
- New Hampshire Historical Marker No. 103: Shapley Line
- New Hampshire Historical Marker No. 119: Old Landing Road
