= Porringer =

Shallow type of bowl

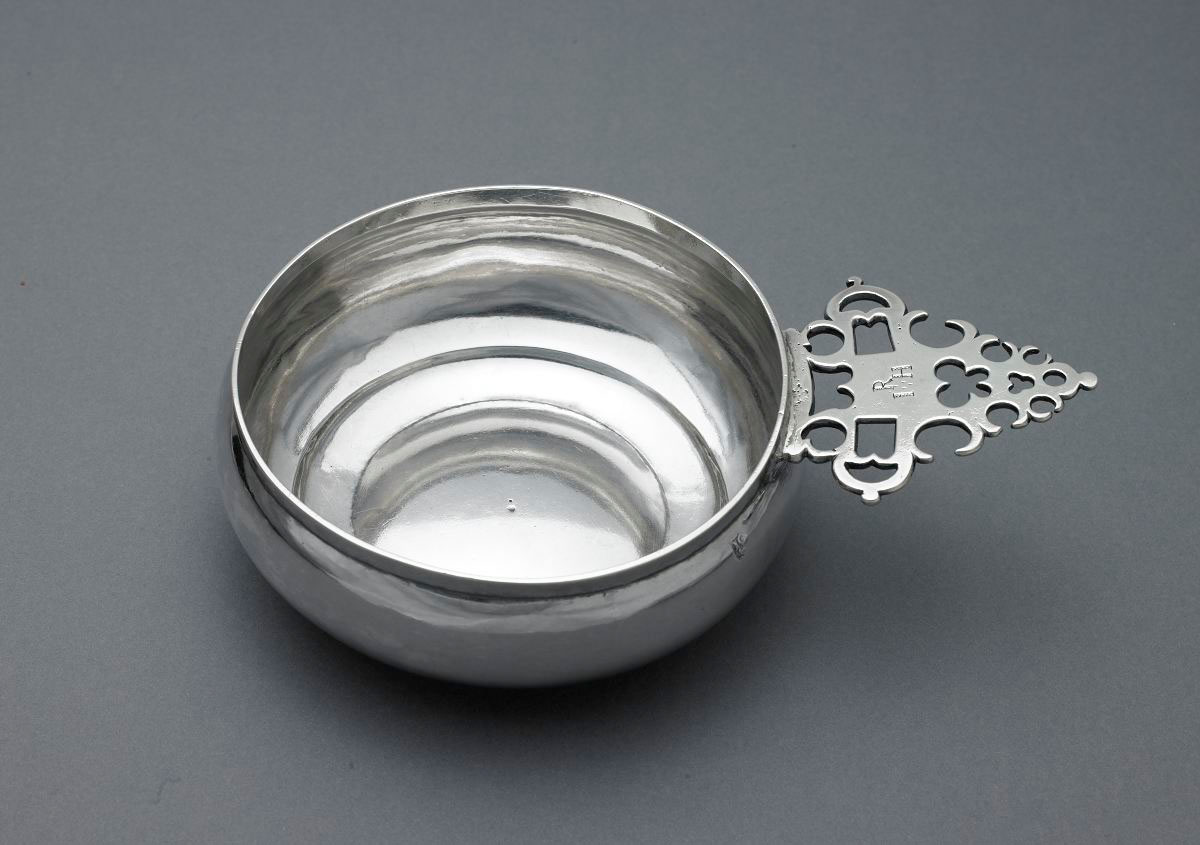
A silver porringer created by John Coney, c. 1710, Birmingham Museum of Art

A porringer is a shallow bowl, between 100 and 150 mm (4–6 inches) in diameter, and 38 to 76 mm (1 1/2–3 inches) deep; the form originated in the medieval period in Europe and was made in wood, ceramic, pewter, cast iron and silver. They had flat, horizontal handles.

The precise purpose of porringers, or écuelles, as they are known in France, is in dispute; but it is thought that they were used to hold broth or gruel.

== Design and material ==
Colonial porringers tended to have one handle, whereas European ones tended to have two handles on opposite sides, on which the owner's initials were sometimes engraved, and they occasionally came with a lid. Porringers resembled the smaller quaich, a Scottish drinking vessel.

Porringers were also made out of earthenware clay that fired to red in a type of pottery that is called "redware" today but was called "earthen" during colonial and Early America. These would have the typical strap or pulled handle that is familiar on mugs and cups today.

One can discern authentic pewter porringers in much the same way that silver can be authenticated from the touch marks that were stamped either into the bowl of the porringer or on its base. Wooden porringers are occasionally found from excavations, e.g., 16th-century example from Southwark and 11th century from Winchester.

The most famous colonial porringers are probably those made by Paul Revere.

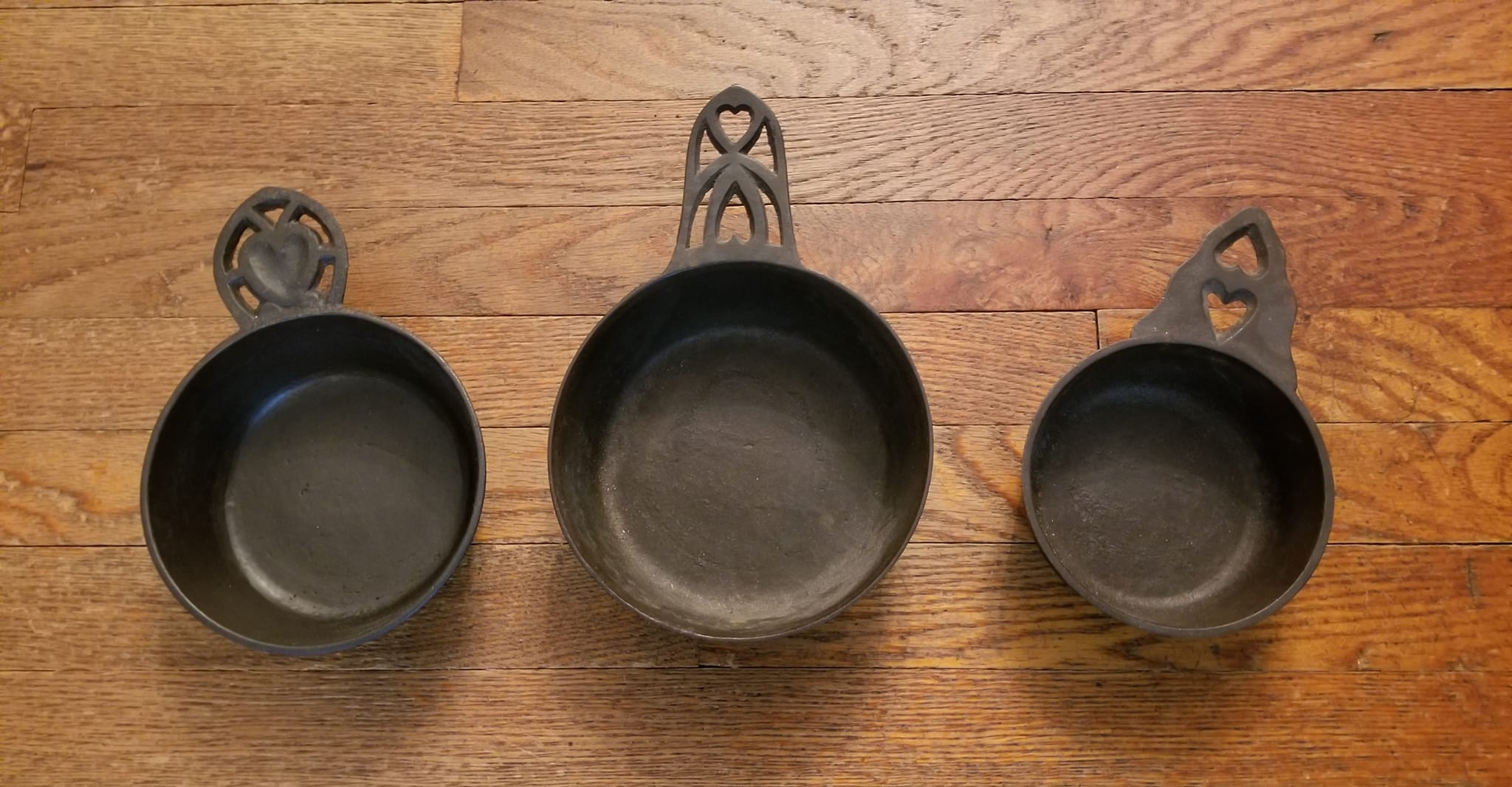
19th Century American Cast Iron Porringers

Porringers of cast iron being enameled, tinned or plain were made in the beginning of 1820s to early 1900s in England by A. Kenrick, W. Bullock & T. Clark for export and made in America by J. Savery and numerous stove and hollow ware foundries. Iron porringers ranged in size from a half pint to 2 quarts. In the US small sizes were for christening in the early 1900s and large size for soups and stews.

== Modern design and use ==
In more modern times, some manufacturers of porringers have produced them without handles. These types of porringers appear to be deep bowls, with the sides being nearly totally flat. Porringers are also used less and less, as a bowl will suffice for most people; porringers, however, are still circulated, mainly as a Christening-gift.

A second, modern usage, for the term porringer is a double saucepan similar to a bain-marie used for cooking porridge. The porridge is cooked gently in the inner saucepan, heated by steam from boiling water in the outer saucepan. This ensures the porridge does not burn and allows a longer cooking time so that the oats can absorb the water or milk in which they are cooked more completely. Also, the porridge does not need stirring during the cooking process, which means the oats maintain their structural integrity and the porridge has a better mouthfeel and texture. The lower heat may also degrade less of the beta-glucan in the oats, which gives oats their cholesterol-lowering properties.

== Alternative names ==
Some collectors or materials historians also call what resembles the pewter porringer a "bleeding cup".

== See also ==
- Grab-it
- List of cooking vessels
