= Bradford Town Hall (New Hampshire) =

- U.S. National Register of Historic Places
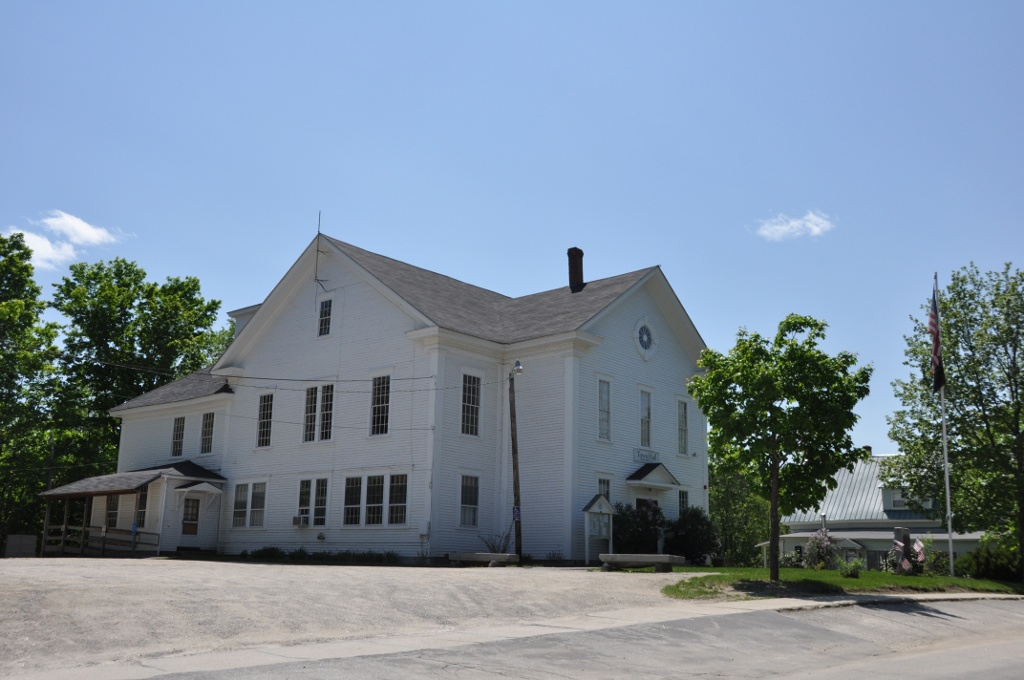

- Location within New Hampshire Location within the United States
- Location: W. Main St., Bradford, New Hampshire
- Coordinates: 43°16′9″N 71°57′42″W
- Area: 1 acre (0.40 ha)
- Built: 1863
- Architectural style: Colonial Revival, Greek Revival
- NRHP reference No.: 80000293
- Added to NRHP: November 13, 1980

The Bradford Town Hall is located on West Main Street in Bradford, New Hampshire. Built in the 1860s with timbers from an earlier meeting house, it has been the town's center of civic affairs since then. It was listed on the National Register of Historic Places in 1980.

== Description and history ==
Bradford Town Hall is located in the town's village center, on the south side of West Main Street, just west of its junction with Church Street. It is a 2-1/2 story timber frame structure, with a cross-gable roof configuration and a clapboarded exterior. The front facade is three bays wide, with a center entrance sheltered by a gabled hood, and an oculus window in the gable above. The building corners have simple Doric pilasters, which rise to a partial entablature.

The building has an unusual history. The town built a meetinghouse in 1797 at a different location (near the site of the Bradford Center Meetinghouse), which was used for both civic and religious functions. In the 1860s, when the state mandated the separation of church and state, the new meetinghouse was built for religious use, and the old one was disassembled and its parts used to build a new town hall. The framing of the building thus has Federal style elements, while the exterior was given a Greek Revival styling popular at that time of this building's construction. An early 20th century addition added Colonial Revival details that were sympathetic to the earlier styling. Alterations in that time included the addition of a stage to the auditorium, and the addition of fire escapes.

== See also ==
- National Register of Historic Places listings in Merrimack County, New Hampshire
- New Hampshire Historical Marker No. 108: Bradford Center
