= William Shirley =

British colonial administrator (1694–1771)

Lieutenant-General William Shirley
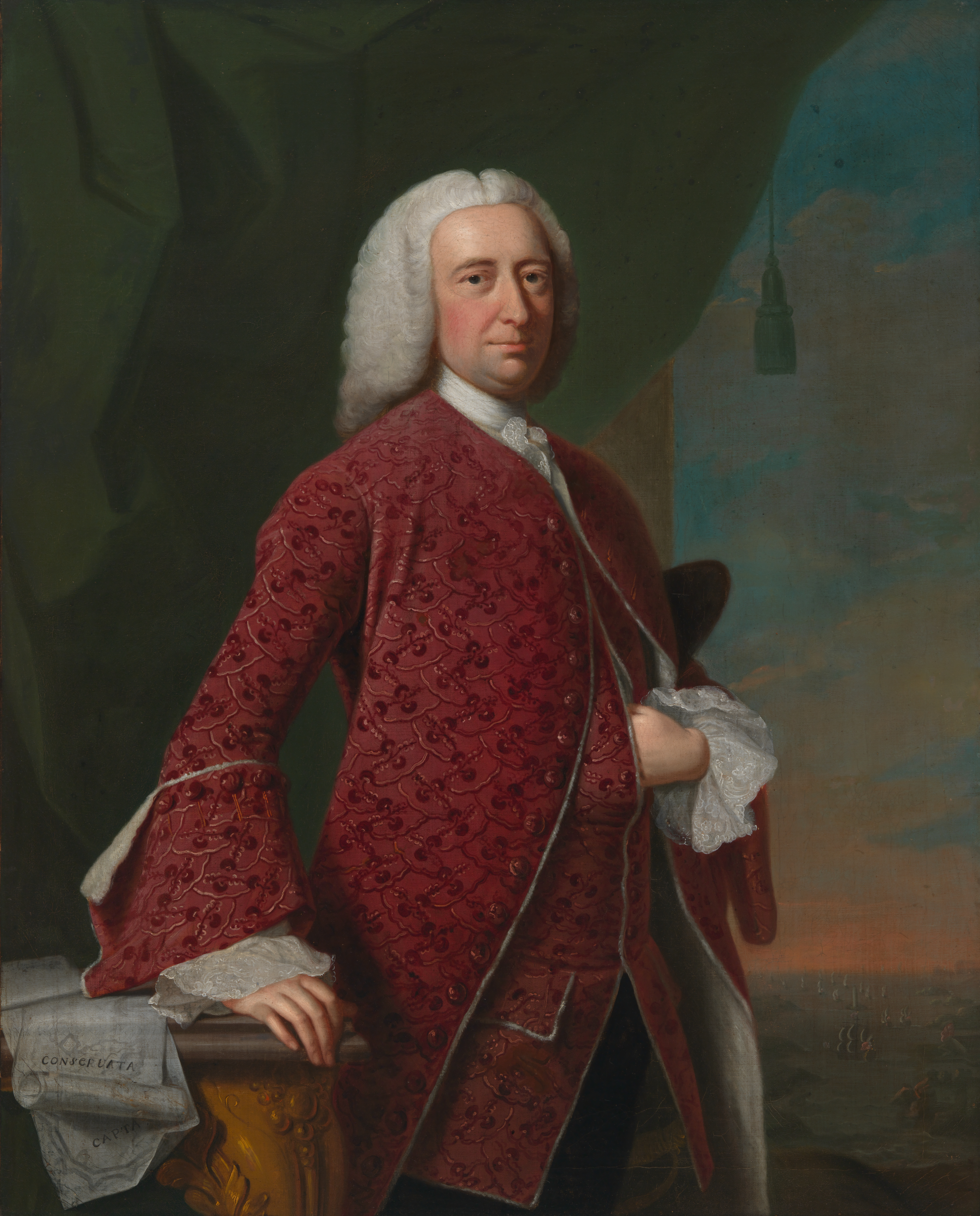
- Portrait of William Shirley by Thomas Hudson, 1750

8th and 9th Governor of the Province of Massachusetts Bay
- In office 14 August 1741 – 11 September 1749
- Preceded by: Jonathan Belcher
- Succeeded by: Spencer Phips (acting)
- In office 7 August 1753 – 25 September 1756
- Preceded by: Spencer Phips (acting)
- Succeeded by: Spencer Phips (acting)

Governor of the Bahamas
- In office 1760–1768
- Preceded by: John Gambier (acting)
- Succeeded by: Thomas Shirley

Personal details
- Born: 2 December 1694 Sussex, England
- Died: 24 March 1771 (aged 76) Roxbury, Province of Massachusetts Bay
- Education: Pembroke College, Cambridge (MA)
- Profession: Barrister, politician
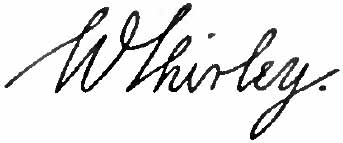
- Signature

William Shirley (2 December 1694 – 24 March 1771) was a British colonial administrator who served as the governor of the British American colonies of Massachusetts Bay and the Bahamas. He is best known for his role in organizing the successful capture of Louisbourg during King George's War, and for his role in managing military affairs during the French and Indian War. He spent most of his years in the colonial administration of British North America working to defeat New France, but his lack of formal military training led to political difficulties and his eventual downfall.

Politically well connected, Shirley began his career in Massachusetts as advocate general in the admiralty court, and quickly became an opponent of Governor Jonathan Belcher. He joined with Belcher's other political enemies to bring about Belcher's recall, and was appointed Governor of Massachusetts Bay in Belcher's place. He successfully quieted political divisions within the province, and was able to bring about united action against New France when King George's War began in 1744. The successful capture of Louisbourg, which Shirley had a major role in organizing, was one of the high points of his administration.

After King George's War Shirley became mired in disputes over funding and accounting for the war effort, and returned to England in 1749 to deal with political and legal matters arising from those disputes. He was then assigned to a commission established by Great Britain and France to determine the colonial borders in North America. His hard-line approach to these negotiations contributed to their failure, and he returned to Massachusetts in 1753.

Military matters again dominated Shirley's remaining years in Massachusetts, with the French and Indian War beginning in 1754. Shirley led a military expedition to reinforce Fort Oswego in 1755, and became Commander-in-Chief, North America upon the death of General Edward Braddock. His difficulties in organizing expeditions in 1755 and 1756 were compounded by political disputes with New York politicians, and over military matters with Indian agent Sir William Johnson. These disagreements led to his recall in 1757 as both commander-in-chief and as governor. In his later years he served as governor of the Bahamas, before returning to Massachusetts, where he died.

== Early life ==
William Shirley, the son of William and Elizabeth Godman Shirley, was born on 2 December 1694 at Preston Manor in East Sussex, England. He was educated at Pembroke College, Cambridge, and then read law at the Inner Temple in London. In 1717 his grandfather died, leaving him Ote Hall in Wivelsfield and some funds, which he used to purchase a clerkship in London. About the same time, he married Frances Barker, with whom he had a large number of children. He was called to the bar in 1720. Although his inheritance had been substantial (about £10,000), he cultivated an expensive lifestyle, and suffered significant financial reverses in the depression of 1721. The financial demands of his large family (he and Frances had eight children by 1731) prompted him to seek an appointment in the North American colonies. His family was connected by marriage to the Duke of Newcastle, who became an important patron and sponsor of Shirley's advancement, and to that of Arthur Onslow, the Speaker of the House of Commons. Armed with letters of introduction from Newcastle and others (but no appointment), Shirley arrived in Boston, Massachusetts, in 1731.

== Advocate general ==
Shirley was initially received with indifference by Massachusetts governor Jonathan Belcher, who refused him patronage positions that became available. In 1733 Shirley sought to secure from David Dunbar the commission as the crown surveyor general, but Dunbar eventually decided to retain the office. Influence from Newcastle eventually yielded Shirley a position as advocate general in the admiralty court. Belcher resisted further entreaties from Newcastle to promote Shirley, and Shirley began using his position to actively prosecute Belcher supporters whose illegal logging activities came under his jurisdiction.

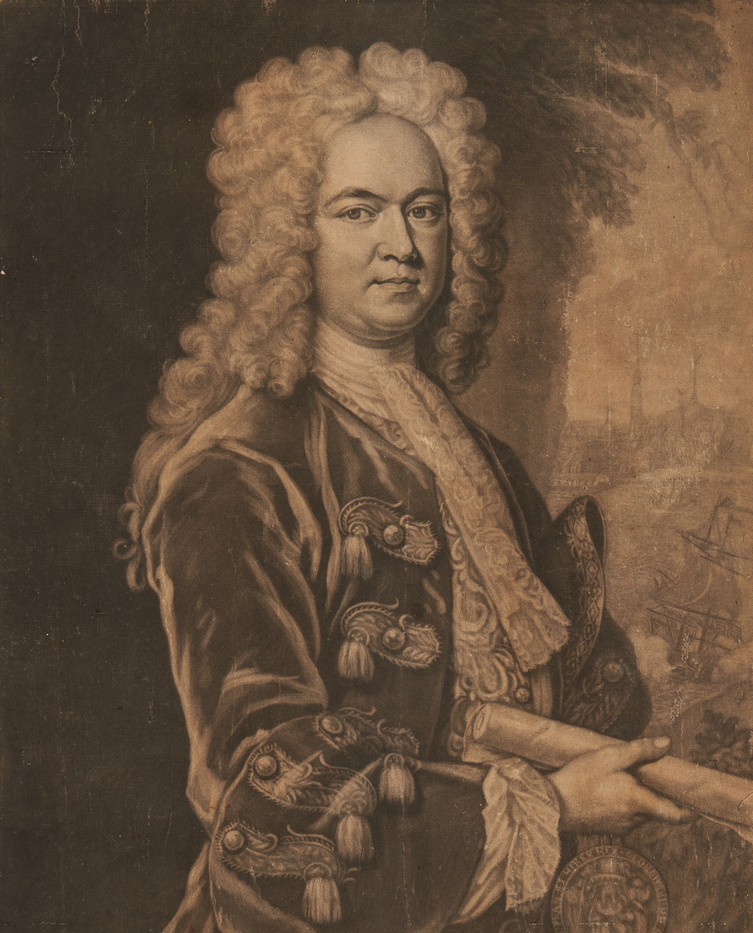
Jonathan Belcher, an opponent of Shirley

Shirley also made common cause with Samuel Waldo, a wealthy merchant and major landowner in the province eastern district (present-day Maine) where Belcher's lax enforcement of timber-cutting laws was harming his business with the Royal Navy. In 1736 Shirley sent his wife to London to lobby on his behalf against Belcher. Waldo also eventually went to London; the combination of Shirley's connection to Newcastle and Waldo's money soon made inroads in the colonial administration. When these were joined by discontented New Hampshire interests (Belcher was also governor of New Hampshire), a full-scale offensive was launched in the late 1730s to unseat Belcher. This included at least one forged letter on the part of Belcher opponents in an attempt to discredit the governor, which Shirley denounced. By 1738 Newcastle was in a dominant position in not just the colonial administration, but also in the British government as an opponent of Prime Minister Sir Robert Walpole, and he actively encouraged Belcher's opponents.

In 1739 the Privy Council reprimanded Belcher, voted to separate the Massachusetts and New Hampshire governorships, and began debating the idea of replacing the governor. The exact reasons for Belcher's dismissal have been a recurring subject of scholarly interest, due to the many colonial, imperial, and political factors at play. Two principal themes within these analyses are Belcher's acquisition of many local enemies, and the idea that good imperial governance in London eventually required his replacement. Before the issues of 1739 most of the efforts to unseat Belcher had failed: Belcher himself noted in that year that "the warr I am ingag'd in is carrying on in much the same manner as for 9 years past." Historian Stephen Foster further notes that someone as powerful as Newcastle was at the time generally had much weightier issues to deal with than arbitrating colonial politics. In this instance, however, imperial and colonial considerations coincided over the need for Massachusetts to provide a significant number of troops for Newcastle's proposed West Indies expedition in the War of Jenkins' Ear. In April 1740 Newcastle in effect offered Shirley the opportunity to prove, in the light of Belcher's political difficulties, that he could more effectively raise troops than the governor could. Shirley consequently engaged in recruiting, principally outside Massachusetts (where Belcher refused his offers of assistance, understanding what was going on), and deluged Newcastle with documentation of his successes while Belcher was preoccupied with a banking crisis. Newcastle handed the issue off to Martin Bladen, secretary to the Board of Trade and a known Belcher opponent. The Board of Trade then apparently decided, based on the weight of the extant evidence, that Belcher needed to be replaced. In April 1741 the Privy Council approved William Shirley's commission as governor of Massachusetts, and Benning Wentworth's commission as governor of New Hampshire was issued the following June.

== Governor of Massachusetts ==
When Shirley assumed the governorship of Massachusetts in August 1741, he was immediately confronted with a currency crisis. The province had been suffering for many years with inflation caused by issuance of increasing quantities of paper currency. Late in Belcher's tenure, competing banking proposals had been made in a bid to address the issue, and a popular proposal for a bank secured by real estate had been enacted. This bank (the controversy over it having contributed to Belcher's recall) had been dissolved by an act of parliament, and Shirley had to negotiate the dissolution of the bank's assets and reclamation of the notes it had issued. In this process, which occupied the rest of 1741, Shirley deftly navigated legislation through the provincial assembly that provided a schedule for redeeming the bank's currency without causing the bank's principal owners to collapse under a deluge of redemptions.

With rising tensions Shirley acted to strengthen the military defenses of the colony. He created a series of provincial companies along the frontier. These included Burke's Rangers and Gorham's Rangers which became the model for Shirley's more famous creation Roger's Rangers.

=== Outbreak of war ===
Britain captured Acadia from France in Queen Anne's War (1702–1713), but the Treaty of Utrecht left Cape Breton Island in French hands, and did not clearly demarcate a boundary between New France and the British colonies on the Atlantic coast. To protect the crucial passageway of the Saint Lawrence River into the heart of New France, France built a strong fortress at Louisbourg on the Atlantic coast of Cape Breton Island.

When Shirley took office, relations between France and Britain were strained, and there was a possibility that Britain would be drawn into the War of the Austrian Succession, which had started on the European mainland in 1740. Shirley was able to finesse his restrictions on the production of paper currency to achieve an updating of the province's defences, and in 1742 requested permission from the Board of Trade for the printing of additional currency should war break out. This permission was granted in 1743, along with a warning that war with France was likely. France declared war against Britain in March 1744, and forces from Louisbourg raided the British fishing port of Canso on the northern end of mainland Nova Scotia before its residents were aware they were at war. French privateers also began preying on British and colonial vessels. British colonial governors along the coast, including Shirley, sent colonial guard ships and authorized their own privateers in response, neutralizing the French activity.

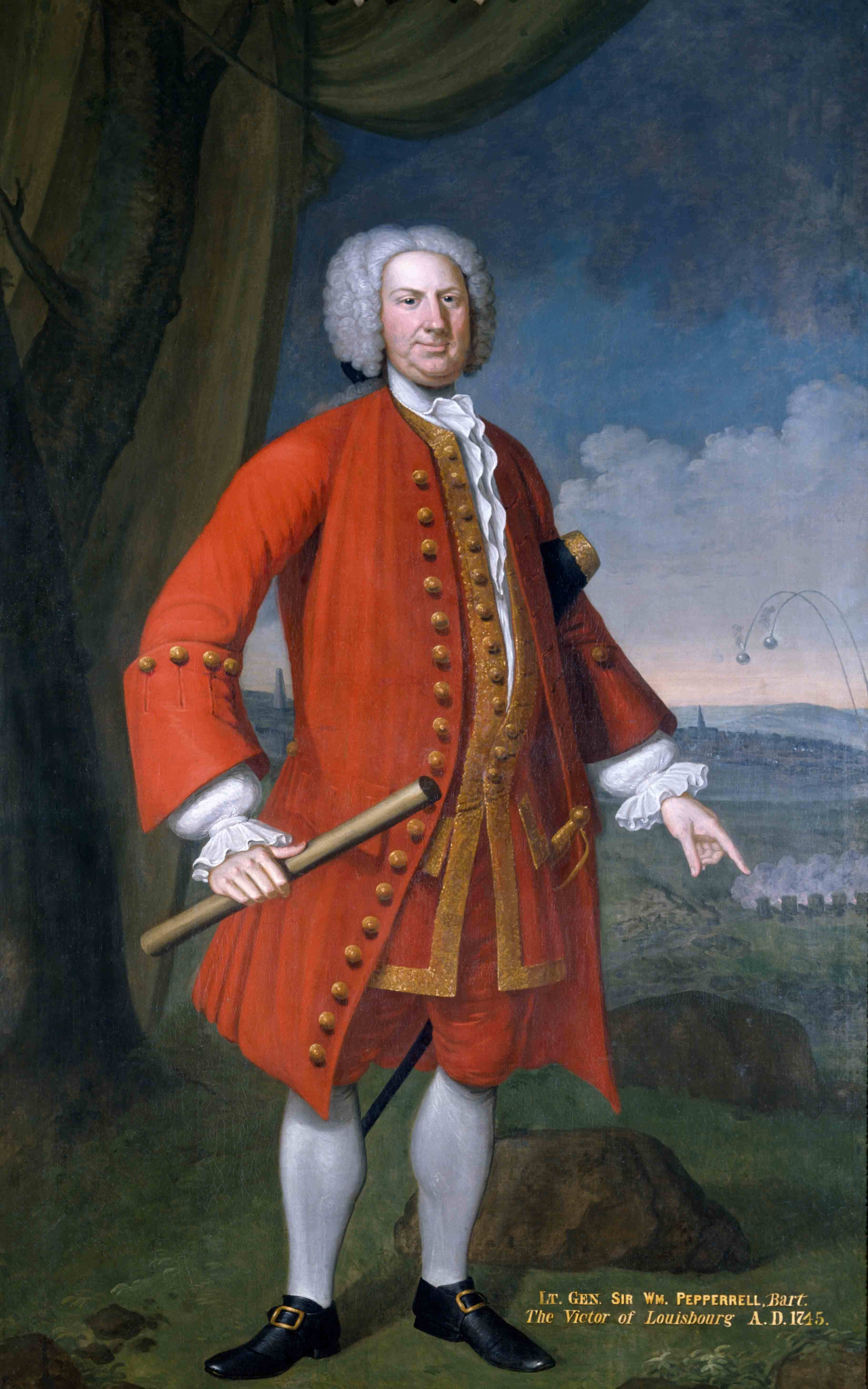
William Pepperrell, portrait by John Smibert

Canso was used by New England fishermen, and as such its fall was of interest to Massachusetts. Shirley had, prior to its capture, received a request for assistance from the lieutenant governor of Nova Scotia, Paul Mascarene, for support in the defence of Annapolis Royal. In response to the fall of Canso and a second, urgent request from Mascarene, Shirley promptly despatched two companies of volunteers to Annapolis Royal. The timely arrival of these troops in early July broke up a siege.

John Bradstreet, who had been captured at Canso and held prisoner at Louisbourg, returned to New England in a prisoner exchange, and gave a detailed report to Shirley that emphasised the weaknesses of the French fort. William Vaughn, who owned several businesses in Maine that were vulnerable to raids from New France, toured New England advocating an expedition to capture Louisbourg. Shirley and other leaders in New England and New York sent letters to colonial authorities in London seeking support for such an expedition, citing the vulnerable conditions at Louisbourg. Vaughn and Bradstreet wanted to attack Louisbourg that winter with an all-colonial force. Shirley doubted the practicality of that plan, but in January 1745 submitted it to the provincial assembly (General Court), which declined to support the plan, but did request that Britain undertake an attack on Louisbourg.

Vaughn continued to advocate for a quick all-American expedition, enlisting the support of fishing captains, merchants and 200 "principal gentlemen" of Boston. Shirley called the General Court into session to discuss the matter once more, and the proposal was submitted to a committee chaired by William Pepperrell. The committee reported favourably on the plan, and it was approved by a single vote when several opponents were absent from the chamber.

Shirley appointed a reluctant William Pepperrell to command the expedition, William Vaughn was appointed colonel, but without a command position, and John Bradstreet was appointed as a military advisor to Pepperrell. Shirley requested support for the expedition from Peter Warren, commodore of the Royal Navy squadron in the West Indies, but Warren declined due to the strenuous objections of his captains. This news arrived in Boston just as the expedition was preparing to leave.

Despite the absence of support from the Royal Navy, the New England expedition set out in March 1745 for Louisbourg. More than 4,000 men on more than 90 transports (mainly fishing boats and coastal traders), escorted by six colonial guard ships, descended on Canso, where the expedition waited for the ice to clear from Gabarus Bay, the site just south of Louisbourg that had been chosen for the troop landing. Starting on 22 April the expedition was joined by four Royal Navy warships under the command of Commodore Warren, who received orders (issued in January, but not received until after his previous refusal) to assist the expedition.

=== Siege of Louisbourg ===
New England provincial troops landing to besiege Louisbourg on 11 May 1745

Provincial troops began landing at Gabarus Bay on 30 April, and laid siege to the fortress while the British navy blockaded the harbour. The provincials began suffering battle losses, while the British naval commanders present, who had a low opinion of provincial soldiers, grew increasingly critical of their efforts. Warren tried to exert control over the provincials, but Pepperrell resisted his efforts. Louisbourg surrendered on 17 June. The provincials lost 180 men to combat, disease or drowning during the siege, while the Royal Navy did not fire on the fortress and lost just one sailor. As the victors settled into their occupation of Louisbourg, friction grew between the provincials and the British. The terms of surrender guaranteed the French in all of their possessions, leaving no plunder for the provincial troops. On the other hand, the Royal Navy had captured several richly-laden French ships, and British sailors on shore leave further strained relations with the provincials by bragging about the quantity of prize money they had received.

The provincial troops had signed up to capture Louisbourg, and expected to go home after siege ended. The Broad Bottom ministry, who had believed that provincials were incapable of capturing Louisbourg on their own, had made no plans to send British regulars to take over occupation of the fortress. When it became evident that regulars would not be relieving the provincials until after winter had passed, Shirley travelled to Louisbourg to raise the morale of the occupational garrison there. His first speech to them had little effect, and some provincials were close to mutiny. In a second speech, Shirley promised to send home more troops immediately, and provide higher pay and better supplies for those who stayed until spring. Honors for the victors were sparse; Pepperrell was made a baronet, he and Shirley were made colonels in the British Army with the right to raise their own regiments, and Warren was promoted to rear admiral.

=== Aborted campaign ===
Shirley had engaged in the Louisbourg campaign primarily as a way to ensure British interests in the Atlantic fisheries. The victory, however, made him expand his vision to encompass the possibility of capturing all of New France. After capturing the French fort he wrote to Newcastle, proposing a series of expeditions to gain control of all of North America as far west as the Mississippi River, starting with one that would go up the Saint Lawrence from Louisbourg. Upon his return to Boston, Shirley began making preparations for such an expedition. In May 1746 he received plans for London outlining an attempt on Quebec using Royal Navy and provincial forces, while a second expedition was to attack Fort Saint-Frédéric on Lake Champlain. Shirley stepped up recruiting in Massachusetts and asked neighboring governors to contribute men and resources to the effort. Expected support from Britain never arrived, however, and the 1746 expeditions were called off.

While waiting for definite word from London of plans for 1747 Shirley beefed up the province's western defenses, and in the spring of 1747 he began sending supplies to the Hudson River valley in anticipation of a move toward Fort Saint-Frédéric. Word then arrived from Newcastle that the British establishment would not support any expeditions against New France. The drop in military spending that resulted had negative consequences on the Massachusetts economy, harming Shirley's popularity.

Shirley personally profited from the supply activities surrounding the Louisbourg expedition. In 1746 he used the funds to purchase an estate in Roxbury, on which he built an elaborate mansion, now known as the Shirley-Eustis House. Before the building was complete his wife died of a fever in August 1746; she was interred in King's Chapel.

=== Impressment crisis ===
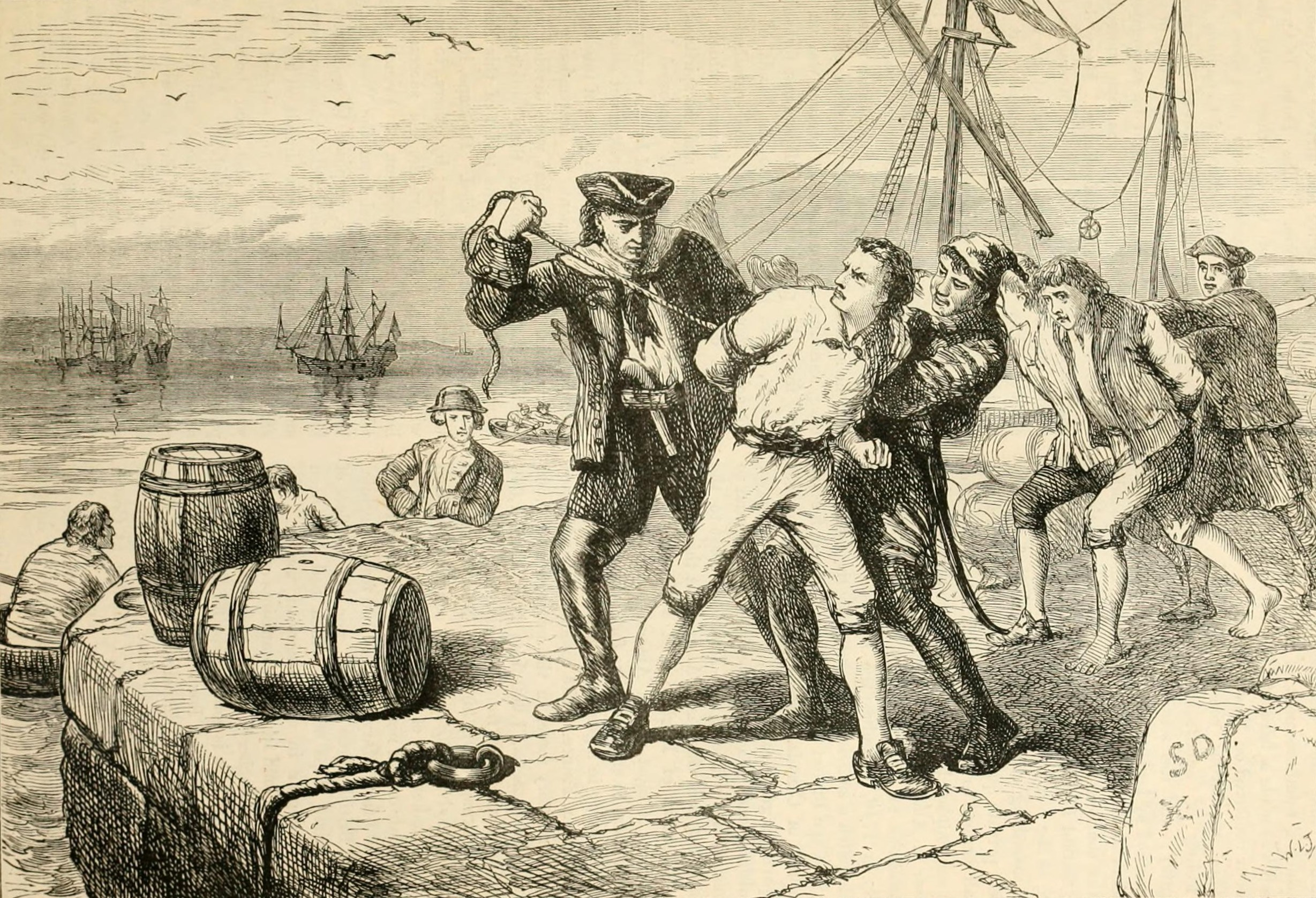
1874 illustration of the impressment that led to the Knowles Riot

While Governor Shirley was at Louisbourg trouble had been brewing between the Royal Navy and the people of Boston. The Navy had long sought to press Americans into service on its ships. Impressment was a long-standing practice in Britain, but its application in America was resisted by the colonists. In 1702 Fort William on Castle Island had fired on a Royal Navy ship as it tried to leave Boston Harbour with six recently impressed men aboard. As a result of American complaints (reinforced by British merchants), Parliament in 1708 banned impressment in the American colonies. Navy leaders argued that the American exemption from impressment had been in force only during Queen Anne's War, which ended in 1713. In practice, Royal Navy captains had to apply to colonial governors for a license to press men. In late November 1745 a fight between a press gang and some sailors staying in a boarding house in Boston left two of the sailors with fatal injuries. Two members of the press gang were charged with murder and convicted, but were released when the indictment was found invalid.

Two years later Commodore Charles Knowles, who served as Governor of Louisbourg after its capture, had a large number of seamen from Boston harbour impressed for service in his squadron, sparking the Knowles Riot. A mob of more than 300 men seized three naval officers and a deputy sheriff and beat the sheriff. The mob then went to Governor Shirley's house, demanding the release of the men impressed by Knowles. Shirley tried to call out the militia, but they did not respond. Shirley did succeed in getting the naval officers into his house, and the mob eventually left. Later in the day Shirley went to the Town House to meet the people. The mob, now consisting of several thousand people, attacked the Town House, breaking many windows in the building. Shirley spoke to the mob and promised to present their demands to Commodore Knowles. The mob left, intending to find a Royal Navy ship to burn.

After Shirley had returned home that afternoon, the mob, which had seized another naval officer and several petty officers, returned to his house. Shirley ordered a number of armed men who were protecting his house to fire at the mob, but William Pepperrell was able to stop Shirley's men from firing and to persuade the mob to leave. In the meantime, Commodore Knowles threatened to bombard Boston with his squadron. It was only after the Massachusetts Council adopted resolutions in support of the demands of the mob that the situation became quieter in Boston. The mob eventually released its hostages and Knowles released the impressed seamen.

=== Compensation and currency ===
Another issue of contention was compensation to the American colonies by Britain for the costs of the expedition against Louisbourg and the long occupation by American troops until the British Army finally took over. This presented Shirley with a problem, because the expedition's leaders, including his former ally Samuel Waldo, grossly inflated their claimed costs. Waldo used Shirley's unwillingness to openly act against him to begin his own efforts to topple the governor. Shirley was only able to forestall this effort by promising the colonial administration that he would achieve financial stability in the province by retiring its paper currency.

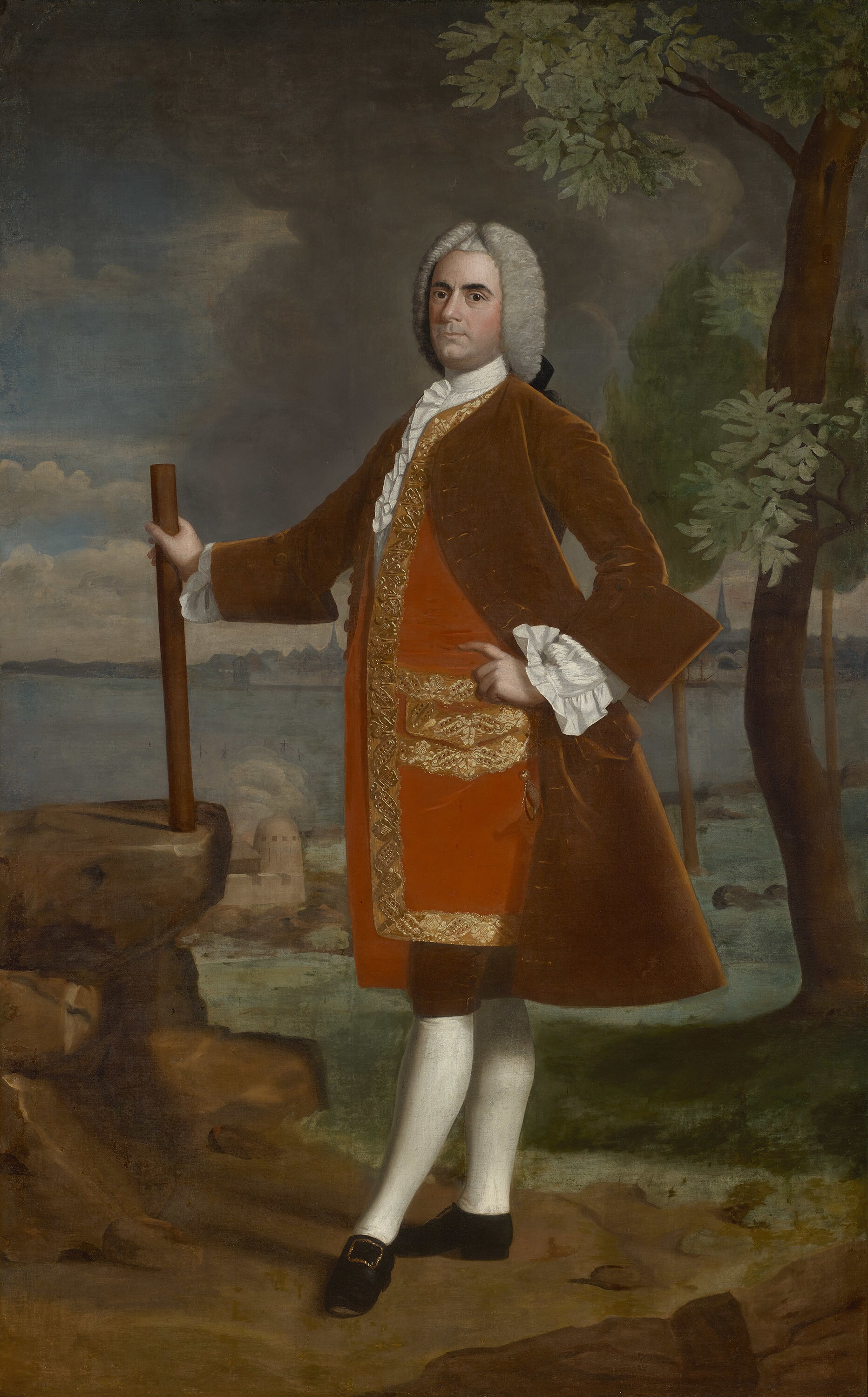
Brigadier-General Samuel Waldo, late 1740s portrait by Robert Feke

The British government was also slow in responding to requests for compensation. While waiting for a response, the question of how to use any compensation was debated in provincial newspapers and pamphlets. Some, such as Samuel Adams (father of the famous American Revolution leader), advocated placing the money in London banks to serve as backing for the paper currency issued by the colonies. Others, including William Douglass and Thomas Hutchinson, speaker of the General Court, favoured using the compensation to redeem the paper currency and give Massachusetts a hard currency. In 1748 the Treaty of Aix-la-Chapelle returned Louibourg to France, with Massachusetts still awaiting compensation for its seizure.

In the meantime, Governor Shirley had been trying to finance a campaign to capture Fort St. Frédéric (at present-day Crown Point, New York), for which he issued more paper money. The campaign was abandoned when the colonies failed to support it, but the resulting inflation helped turn supporters of Shirley against him. The loss of Louisbourg increase public dissatisfaction with Shirley, who was seen as complicit in British scheming against the American colonies. Even William Pepperrell joined the large number of citizens calling for Shirley's removal. Samuel Adams edited and Gamaliel Rogers and Daniel Fowle published The Independent Advertiser, which regularly criticised the British government and Shirley's administration. The paper published several of Shirley's letters to officials in Britain that were critical of Americans, and regularly called for the governor's removal. William Douglass, a prominent physician in Boston, wrote a series of pamphlets (published by Rogers and Fowle) attacking Shirley, Commodore Knowles, and the whole conduct of the campaign for Louisbourg and its occupation. Both Shirley and Knowles sued Douglass for libel, but lost their cases in court.

Shirley's conflict with Samuel Waldo over expenses eventually reached a high pitch: Shirley had successfully attached some of Waldo's assets in legal action, which Waldo had countered with further legal action. Shirley appealed these actions to London, and was granted permission (received in August 1749) to travel to London to deal with the matter. He sailed for Britain in September 1749, just before the long promised compensation reached Boston. Under legislation shepherded by Thomas Hutchinson, the specie delivered was used to retire the paper currency. While Shirley was abroad, Hutchinson, Andrew Oliver, and others served as his surrogates, and he carefully instructed Lieutenant Governor Spencer Phips to not give his enemies opportunities to manoeuvre in his absence.

== European interlude ==
In London Shirley met with Newcastle and the colonial secretary, the Duke of Bedford to discuss colonial matters and his situation. Newcastle ordered the military books of Waldo and Pepperrell to be scrutinized; the analysis was found to confirm Shirley's position. Shirley's accounts were also examined, and were found to be "made up with great exaction", "more conformable to his Majesty's orders ... than any other of the colonies."

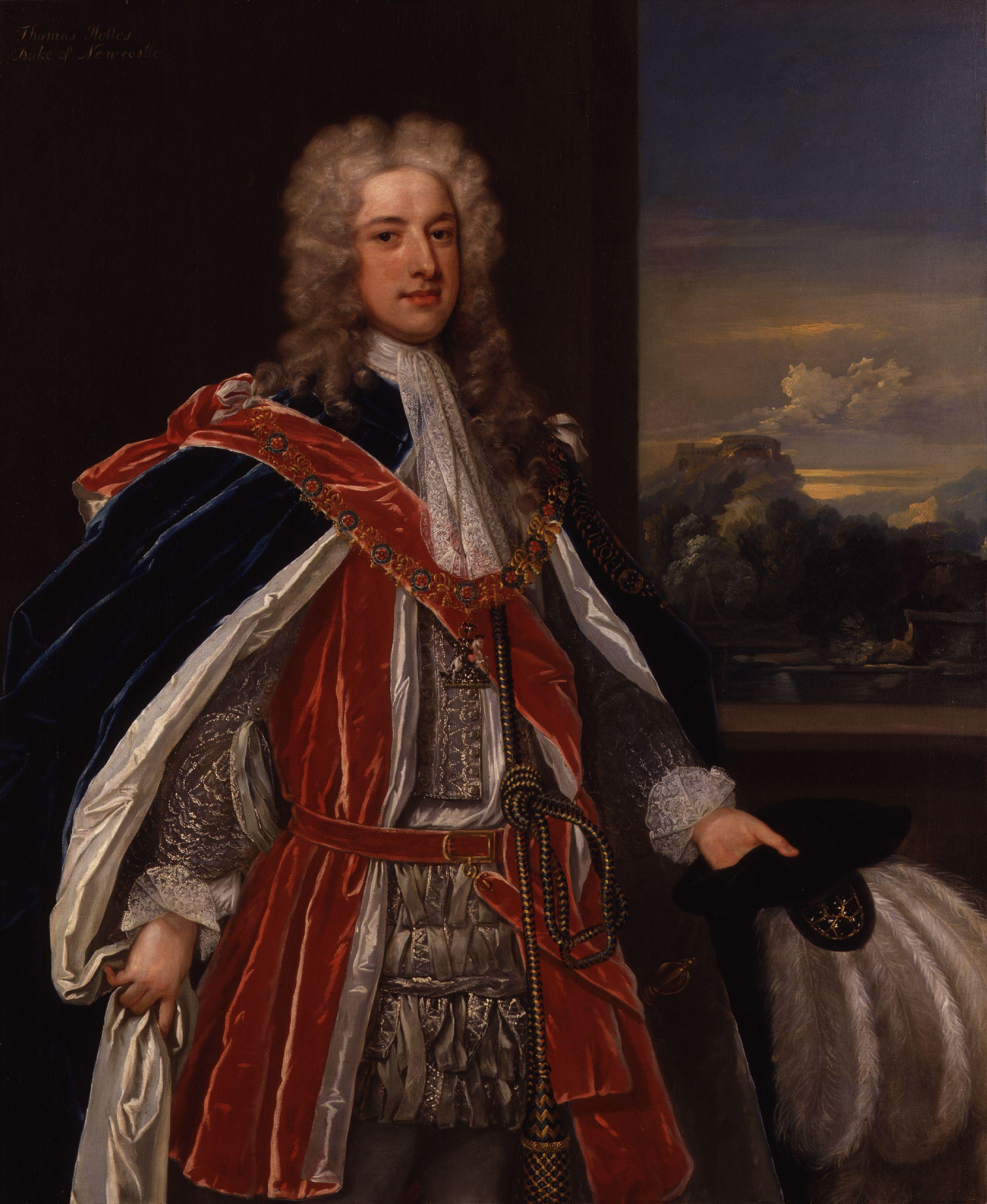
Shirley's patron, the Duke of Newcastle; c. 1730s portrait by Charles Jervas

Shirley also communicated political concerns over which he and New York governor George Clinton had commiserated. While he was in London, word arrived that Clinton wanted to leave his post. Shirley applied to Newcastle for the job, but was turned down. Newcastle may have been upset with Shirley, who had accepted an unexpected offer from Bedford to participate in a commission established to delineate the boundaries between the British and French territories in North America. The commission was set to meet in Paris, and Shirley saw it as an opportunity to advance his expansionist views. Newcastle and Bedford were at the time involved in a political struggle, and Newcastle was unhappy that Shirley had accepted Bedford's offer. Shirley was able to convince Newcastle that his experience and position would be of use in the negotiations.

The commission met in Paris, and Shirley was accompanied by William Mildmay, a somewhat mild-mannered merchant, as cocommissioner. Shirley adopted a hard line in the negotiations, arguing in a technical and lawyerly fashion for an expansive reading of British territory; he claimed all territory east of a line from the Kennebec River north to the Saint Lawrence River, while the French claimed all of that area except peninsular Nova Scotia. Shirley's approach served to harden negotiating positions and bogged the commission's work down in minutiae. When Mildmay complained of this to London, Bedford rebuked Shirley for spending too much effort on trivialities. While the negotiations dragged on, both French and British operatives were actively expanding their interests in the Ohio River valley, raising tensions.

In 1751 Shirley incited a minor scandal when he married Julie, the young daughter of his Paris landlord. He was recalled to London after Mildmay complained that Shirley was taking actions without consulting him. Shirley returned to London convinced that the French needed to be driven from North America. Mildmay attempted to continue the negotiations, believing that he could overcome Shirley's previous obstructionism, but the negotiations ended in failure.

Shirley renewed his application for the New York governorship, but was snubbed by Newcastle, who was upset over Shirley's marriage. He was instead ordered to return to Massachusetts. This he did, leaving his wife in London. It is unclear if they ever saw each other again: biographer John Schutz believes they did not, but family lore is that they were reunited after Shirley left the Massachusetts governorship.

== Return to Massachusetts ==
The opposition in Massachusetts to Shirley had died down while he was in England and Paris. Shirley soon had to deal with the increasing conflict on the frontier with French Canada. Tensions had been increasing, particularly in the Ohio Country, where British and French traders were coming into conflict. When (false) rumors reached Boston in 1754 of French military activity on the province's northern frontier (Maine), Shirley was quick to organize an expedition to the Kennebec River to bolster the area's defenses. This expedition erected Fort Halifax in what is now Winslow, Maine. News of hostilities in the Ohio Country brought further urgency to that matter, as well as attendance at a planned conference of colonies at Albany, New York. Because of the urgency, and the support of politically powerful Maine landowners, Shirley's relationship with the provincial assembly was relatively good. Shirley instructed the provincial representatives to the Albany Conference to seek a colonial union, but the provincial assembly (along with those of other provinces) rejected the conference's proposals.

=== Seven Years War: 1755 campaigns ===
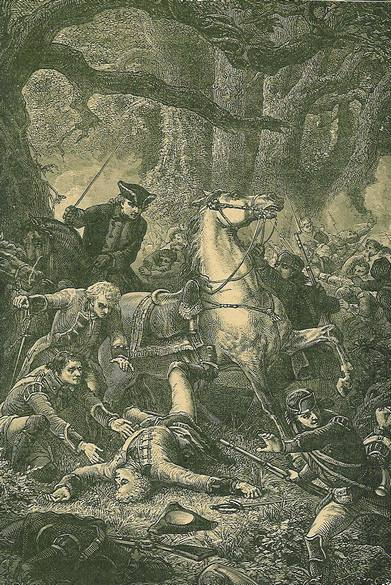
19th century depiction of the wounding of General Edward Braddock at the Battle of the Monongahela

Shirley was approached by Nova Scotia Governor Charles Lawrence for assistance in dealing with the French threat on that province's frontiers, suggesting that they collaborate on military actions there. Shirley and Lawrence believed their proposed expedition would also require assistance from Britain, and sent letters requesting the same. At the same time they ramped up preparations in anticipation of the request being approved. Shirley was also ordered to activate and recruit for his regiment, which was to serve in Braddock's force. Because he could not leave the province he sent one of his sons to New York to recruit troops there; Massachusetts men were being drafted for the Nova Scotia expedition. He furthermore revived the idea of an expedition against Fort St. Frédéric, although he limited the first year's action to the establishment of a fort at the southern end of Lake George, and sought to draw the leaders of neighboring colonies to assist in the operation. He mollified New York's acting governor James DeLancey, who was generally hostile to Massachusetts interests, by proposing that the expedition be led by New York's Indian commissioner, Colonel William Johnson. Johnson was at first reluctant, but Shirley was able to convince him to take the command.

Since the French and Indian War had become a matter of imperial concern, two British Army regiments under General Edward Braddock were sent to America. In written exchanges, Braddock announced his intention to use this force against Fort Duquesne in the Ohio Country, while Shirley unsuccessfully lobbied him to instead target Fort Niagara. At a conference of governors and military leaders in April 1755 Shirley favorably impressed Braddock. Braddock declared that Duquesne would be his target, but he authorized Shirley to take his regiment and that of Sir William Pepperrell to Fort Niagara, and confirmed Johnson's command of the Lake George campaign. Braddock's instructions only gave Shirley the vaguest command over Johnson, which was to later become a source of trouble. The two northern expeditions were to be made without logistical assistance from the regular army.

From the conference Shirley traveled to New York City, where he negotiated with merchants for supplying his expedition. The frosty relationship he had with Governor DeLancey continued; the DeLanceys objected to what they saw as Massachusetts interference in their provincial affairs. When Shirley moved to prevent New York agent Oliver DeLancey from recruiting in Connecticut, it caused a stink and threatened to derail planning for the New York expeditions. Shirley then created a breach with Johnson by attempting to siphon troops from Johnson's command to increase his own force for the Fort Niagara expedition. The antagonism was furthered by the fact that the two expeditions were competing for supplies from the same sources, and was also exacerbated by ongoing border disputes between the provinces.

When Shirley and Johnson met in July 1755 before their respective expeditions set off, tension between the two men continued, and Johnson delayed decisions on assigning Indian auxiliaries to Shirley's campaign, observing that much of the expedition was traveling through friendly Iroquois territory, where they would not yet be needed. Shirley took offense at this as an act of insubordination. Believing he outranked Johnson, Shirley next sought to bypass the Indian agent and negotiate directly with the tribes for recruits, but Johnson and his subordinates actively opposed the move. The Iroquois also objected to the presence of Shirley's recruiting agent, Colonel John Lydius, with whom they had outstanding issues over past land transactions. The situation was not made easier by the fact that neither Johnson nor Shirley had ever commanded expeditions of the size and scope proposed.

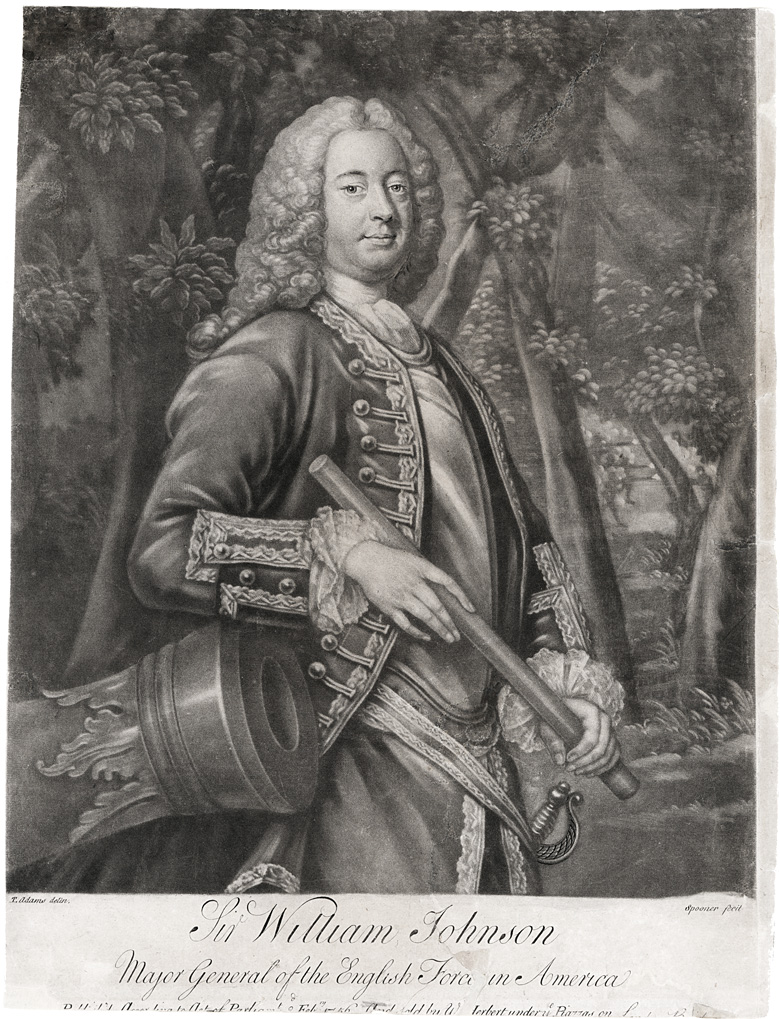
1756 engraved portrait of William Johnson

Shirley's expedition reached Fort Oswego in mid-August. The trek up the Mohawk River had been slowed by low water, and it was being incompetently supplied, resulting in a shortage of provisions. Shirley learned en route that General Braddock had died in the aftermath of 13 July Battle of the Monongahela, which also claimed the life of Shirley's son William. As a result, he became temporary commander-in-chief of North American forces. His expedition then became bogged down at Fort Oswego by the need to improve its defenses, and the ongoing provisioning crisis. In a council on 18 September it was decided to proceed with plans to reach Fort Niagara, but one week later the decision was reversed. Shirley returned to Albany, preoccupied with the need to manage the entire British war effort on the continent.

William Johnson's expedition fared little better than Shirley's. He reached the southern end of Lake George, where his forces had an inconclusive encounter with French forces on 8 September, and began work on Fort William Henry. Rumors of French movements brought a flurry of activity in November, but when the opposition failed to materialize, much of Johnson's force abandoned the camp to return home. Shirley had to pressure New England's governors to assign militia to the new posting for the winter.

In Nova Scotia, Governor Lawrence had easily captured Fort Beauséjour, and had then embarked on what has since become known as the Great Expulsion, the forcible removal of more than 12,000 Acadians from Nova Scotia. When some of the ships carrying the Acadians entered Boston Harbor in early December 1755, Shirley ordered that they not disembark. For three winter months, until March 1756, the Acadians remained on the ships, where half died from the cold weather and malnutrition.

=== Seven Years War: 1756 campaigns ===
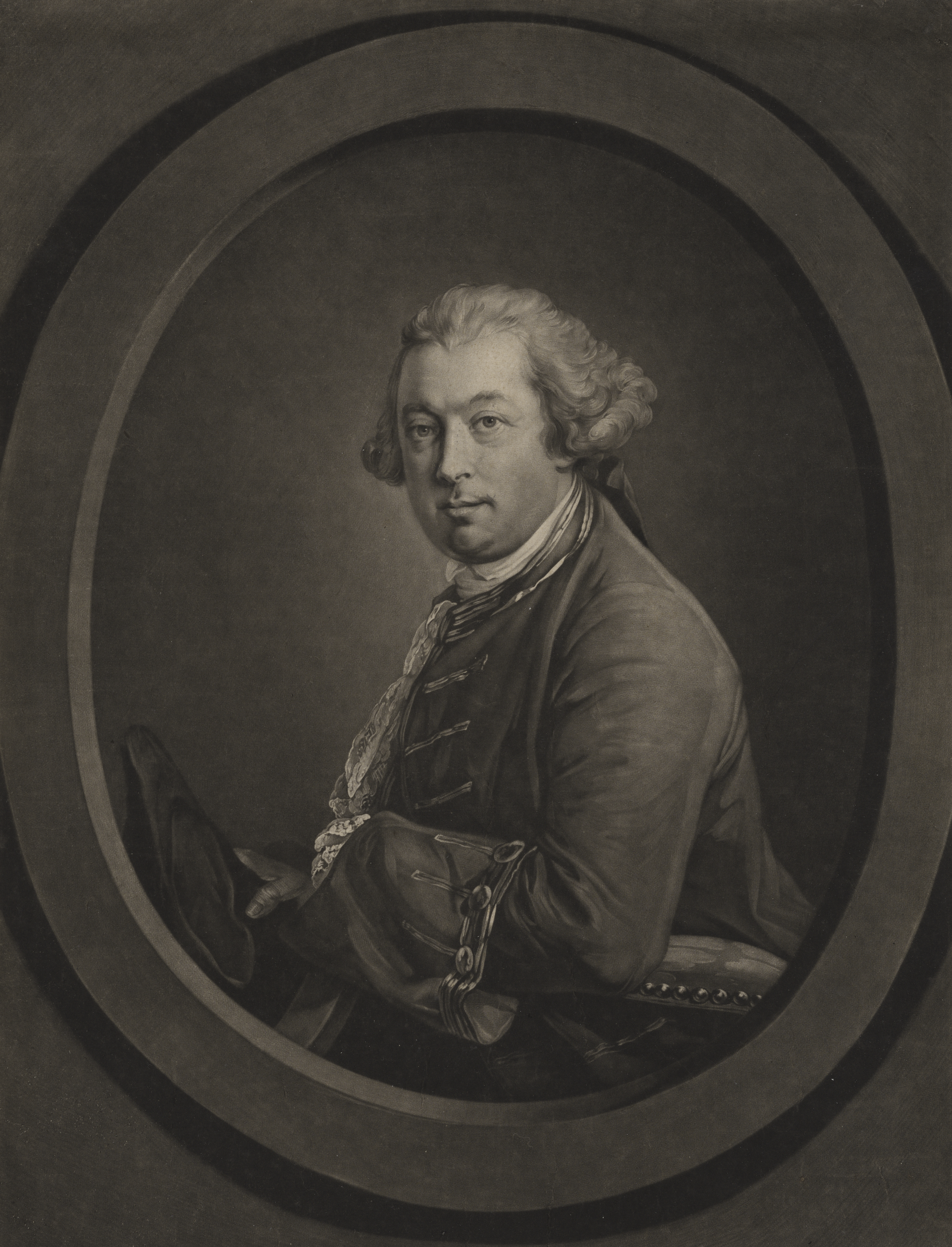
Thomas Pownall, who helped engineer Shirley's recall.

During the winter of 1755–56 Shirley's feud with Johnson continued. Johnson, who was being advised by Thomas Pownall, continued to assert his exclusive authority over interactions with Indians, and renewed complaints about Shirley's interference in recruiting for the 1755 campaign. In one letter Johnson wrote that Shirley had "become my inveterate enemy" who would do everything he could "to blast if he can my character." Johnson made common cause with the DeLanceys (to whom he was related by marriage) in their dislike of Shirley. They all fed unflattering reports to the new New York governor, Sir Charles Hardy, who forwarded them on to London. Shirley was unaware of this looming threat to his authority.

As commander-in-chief, Shirley made a grandiose proposal for the 1756 campaign season in November 1755, continuing the routes of attack begun in 1755 and adding an expedition to Quebec via the Kennebec River. However, the complaints against him had reached the Duke of Newcastle, who felt he needed someone less embroiled in controversies with other leaders in charge of military matters in North America. British leaders had also received intercepted letters destined for France that some believed might have been written by Shirley, in part because he married a Frenchwoman. Thomas Pownall traveled to London in early 1756 and further denounced Shirley to the colonial administration. Shirley did not learn of these matters until April 1756, by which time the British leadership had already decided to replace him as commander-in-chief.

While waiting for his replacement (Lord Loudoun) Shirley made every effort to advance supplies and reinforcements to the Fort Oswego garrison, which had been on short rations for the winter, and whose supply line had been interrupted by the Battle of Fort Bull in March 1756. He continued to mobilize resources and personnel for at least the Oswego and Lake George efforts, but his authority was waning due to widespread knowledge of his replacement. Military affairs continued to deteriorate on the New York frontier before Loudoun finally arrived in July 1756; Fort Oswego fell to the French on 10 August.

Although Shirley had been removed as commander-in-chief, he retained the Massachusetts governorship. He expected to lose even that post not long after his return to Boston in August. However, no replacement had yet been named, and Loudoun saw either Shirley's interference or ineffectiveness in all that was wrong on the New York frontier. He also raised detailed questions about Shirley's war-related expenditures, which he (and later historians) concluded was poorly disguised patronage spending. Loudoun and Shirley argued over many issues, including Shirley's continuance of military preparations after January 1756, when Loudoun's commission was issued. Shirley pointed out that British leadership could hardly expect preparations to cease in the interval between Loudoun's commission and his arrival to take command. While he waited for a replacement to be announced, Shirley took depositions, gathered evidence to support his version of affairs, and worked to close his financial affairs down. (Loudoun was of the opinion that Shirley delayed his departure intentionally as a political maneuver.) He sailed for England in October 1756. Shirley would be formally replaced by Thomas Pownall in 1757.

== Later life ==
Upon his arrival in London, Shirley was received by Newcastle and other sympathetic figures, but Newcastle had been forced from office by the poor showing in the war, and Shirley's ongoing disagreements with Loudoun meant he was unlikely to receive another North American posting. Newcastle then withdrew his support from Shirley over a hearing into matters disputed between Loudoun and Shirley. Shirley was not granted formal hearings on other aspects of his conduct, and managed to convince Newcastle to overlook the matter of his "muddled" accounts. His prospects brightened when Loudoun and Pownall were both damaged by the continued poor military performance in North America (notably the debacle of the Siege of Fort William Henry in August 1757, which resulted in Loudoun's recall). These failures served to rehabilitate Shirley and bring him back into Newcastle's good graces.

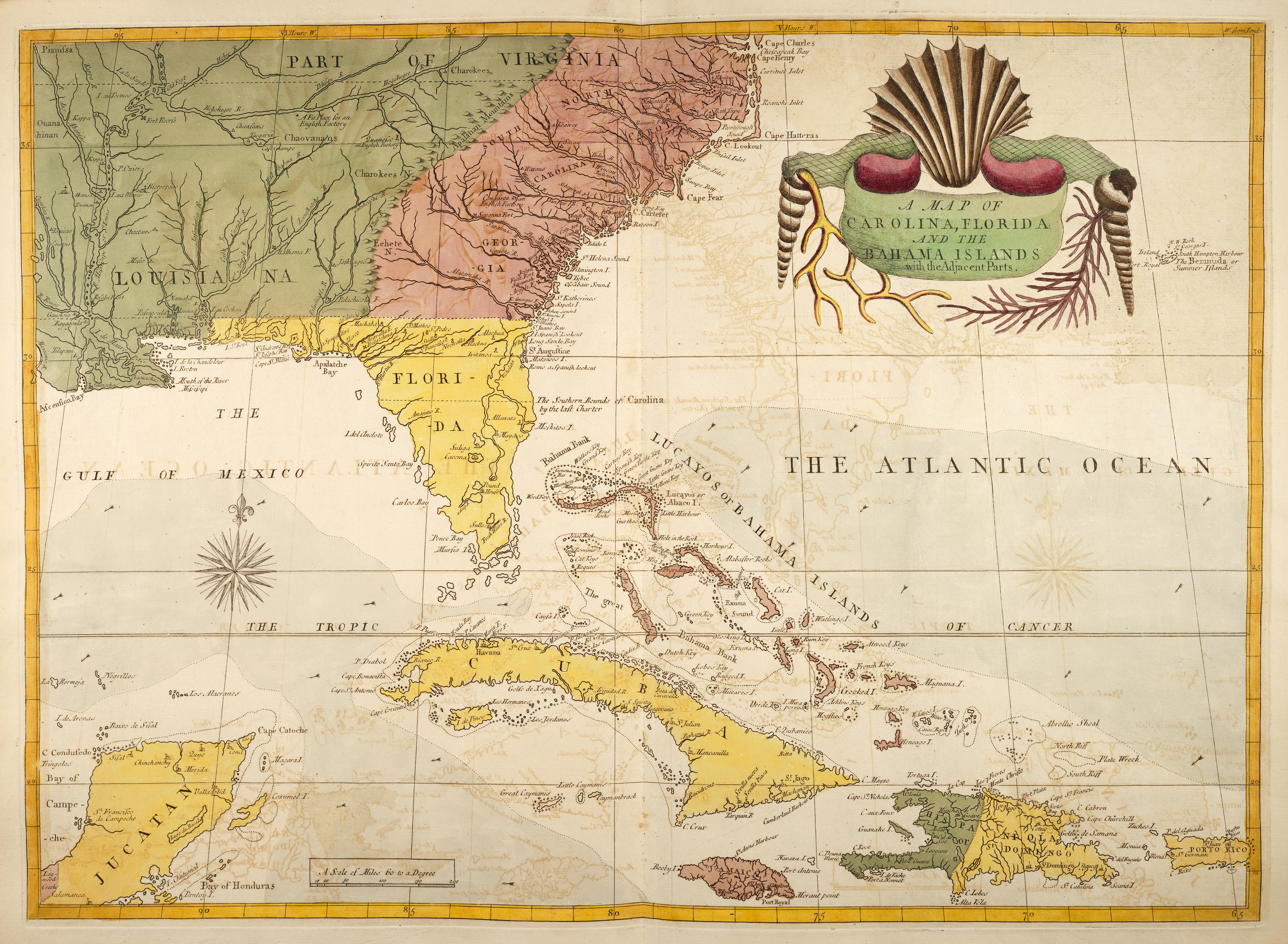
1754 map showing The Bahamas, Spanish Florida, and Caribbean islands

In late 1758 Shirley was commissioned as Governor of the Bahamas. This was followed in early 1759 with a promotion to lieutenant general. After a lengthy passage, Shirley arrived in the Bahamas on 31 December, when his ship was wrecked on a reef in the islands. He eventually arrived without incident or injury at Nassau and assumed the reins of power. (Note: Due to delays involved in preparing his commission, instructions, and other documents, his lengthy journey, and the events and dates surrounding his arrival, many histories give discrepant dates for the start of his rule.) His rule was quiet; dealing with smugglers in the islands was the major issue demanding the governor's attention. In part to combat illicit trade he lobbied the London government that Nassau be established as a free port. Although he was influential in this regard, Nassau did not receive this status until after he left office. He also oversaw renovations to the governor's mansion, and promoted the construction of churches with funding from the Society for the Propagation of the Gospel. In 1765, after his wife's death, he took his children to England so that they could be properly cared for. He returned to the islands, where he had to deal with protests of the recently enacted Stamp Act. When he proposed the use of the stamps on official documents to the local assembly, the reaction in opposition was so visceral that Shirley dissolved the body. By the time the next assembly met, the Stamp Act had been repealed.

His health failing, Shirley was eventually replaced as governor by his son Thomas, who was appointed in November 1767 and arrived to assume office the following year. Shirley sailed for Boston, where he took up residence in his old house in Roxbury with his daughter and son-in-law. There he died on 24 March 1771. After a state funeral, he was interred in King's Chapel.

== Family and legacy ==
Coat of Arms of William Shirley

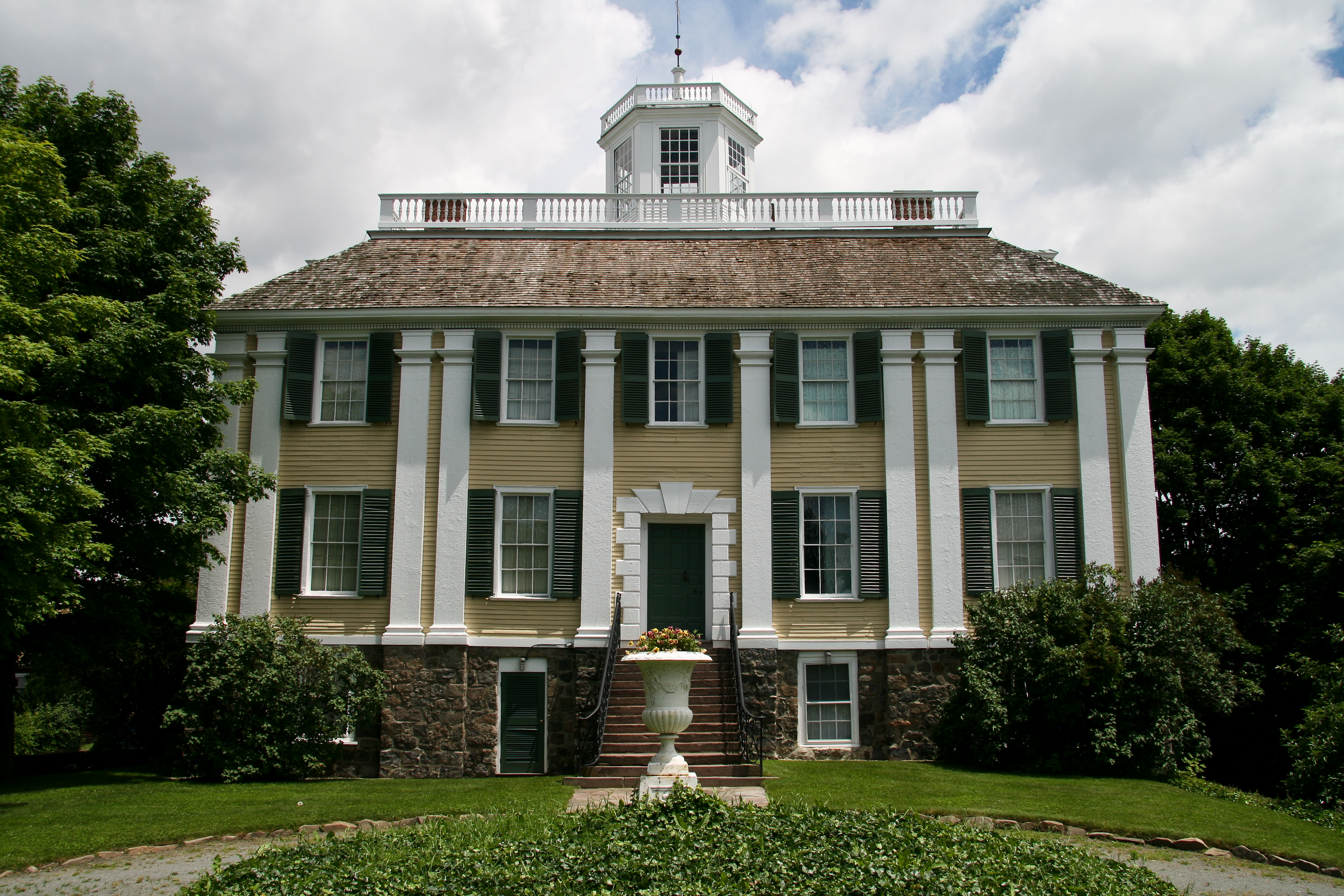
The Shirley-Eustis House, in Roxbury, now part of Boston

Shirley married twice and had two sons and three daughters.

His elder son Thomas (later Sir Thomas) became a major general in the British army, was created a baronet in 1786 as "Shirley baronets, of Oat Hall (1786)" Sussex, and served, after his posting to the Bahamas, as Governor of Dominica and Governor of the Leeward Islands. Sir Thomas died in 1800. The Baronetcy became extinct after the death of Sir Thomas Shirley's son Sir William Warden Shirley, 2nd Baronet (1772–1815).

Shirley's other son, William Jr., was killed in 1755 at the Battle of the Monongahela whilst serving with Edward Braddock. Shirley's eldest daughter Anne married John Erving, a member of the Massachusetts Governor's Council; their daughter Anne married Duncan Stewart of Ardsheal, Chief of the Clan Stewart of Appin. Shirley's youngest daughter Maria Catherina married John Erving Jnr.

Shirley built a family home in Roxbury between 1747 and 1751. He sold it to his daughter and son-in-law, Eliakim Hutchinson, in 1763. It later came into the hands of William Eustis, Governor of Massachusetts in the 19th century. Now known as the Shirley-Eustis House, it still stands at 33 Shirley Street. It has largely been restored and is a museum open to the public.

The town of Shirley, Massachusetts, was founded during his term as Massachusetts governor. The Winthrop, Massachusetts geographical feature Shirley Point and the former feature Shirley Gut are named for him. Shirley helped to establish a cod fishery in Winthrop in 1753. Shirley is also the namesake of Shirley Street in Halifax, Nova Scotia (which is parallel to Pepperell Street, named after William Pepperell).

== Works ==
- Shirley, William (1746). Letter to the Duke of Newcastle, with a Journal of the Siege of Louisburg. London: E. Owen. OCLC 753169340.
- Shirley, William; Alexander, William (1758). The Conduct of Major Gen. William Shirley briefly stated. London: R. and J. Dodsley. OCLC 10899657.
- Shirley, William (1912). Lincoln, Charles Henry (ed.). Correspondence of William Shirley, Volume 1. New York: Macmillan. OCLC 1222698.
- Shirley, William (1912). Lincoln, Charles Henry (ed.). Correspondence of William Shirley, Volume 2. New York: Macmillan. OCLC 1222698.

== Citations ==
Government offices
Preceded by Jonathan Belcher	Governor of the Province of Massachusetts Bay; 14 August 1741 – 11 September 1749	Succeeded by Spencer Phips (acting)
Preceded by Spencer Phips (acting)	Governor of the Province of Massachusetts Bay; 7 August 1753 – 25 September 1756	Succeeded by Spencer Phips (acting)
Preceded by John Gambier (acting)	Governor of the Bahamas; 1759–1768	Succeeded by Thomas Shirley
Military offices
Preceded by Edward Braddock	Commander-in-Chief, North America; 1755–1756	Succeeded by The Earl of Loudoun
