= Daniel Fowle =

Daniel Fowle may refer to:

- Daniel Gould Fowle (1831–1891), governor of the U.S. state of North Carolina, 1889–1891
- Daniel Fowle (printer) (1715–1787), American printer before and during the American Revolution
