= Spencer Phips =

American colonial (1685–1757)

Spencer Phips JP

Lieutenant Governor of the Province of Massachusetts Bay
- In office August 8, 1732 – April 4, 1757
- Preceded by: William Tailer
- Succeeded by: Thomas Hutchinson

Acting Governor of the Province of Massachusetts Bay
- In office September 15, 1749 – August 7, 1753
- Preceded by: William Shirley
- Succeeded by: William Shirley
- In office September 25, 1756 – April 4, 1757
- Preceded by: William Shirley
- Succeeded by: Massachusetts Governor's Council (acting)

Personal details
- Born: June 6, 1685 Rowley, Massachusetts
- Died: April 4, 1757 (aged 71) Cambridge, Massachusetts
- Education: Harvard College

Spencer Phips JP (June 6, 1685 – April 4, 1757) was a government official in the Province of Massachusetts Bay. Born Spencer Bennett, he was adopted by Massachusetts Governor Sir William Phips, his uncle by marriage, whose name he legally took. Phips served for many years in the provincial assembly, and on the governor's council, before receiving an appointment as lieutenant governor in 1732, a post he held until his death. He was twice formally acting governor.

== Early life ==
Spencer Bennett was born on June 6, 1685, in Rowley, Massachusetts Bay Colony. His father, David Bennett, was a local physician, and his mother Rebecca's sister Mary was married to Sir William Phips, who became the first governor of the Province of Massachusetts Bay in 1692. Bennett was adopted by the childless Phips, and formally took his name in 1716. He graduated from Harvard College in 1703 (listed at the top of the class because of the prominence of his family). In 1706 he purchased a large tract of land encompassing much of eastern Cambridge, where he settled. He married Elizabeth Hutchinson in 1707, with whom he had eleven children; five, one son and four daughters, survived him.

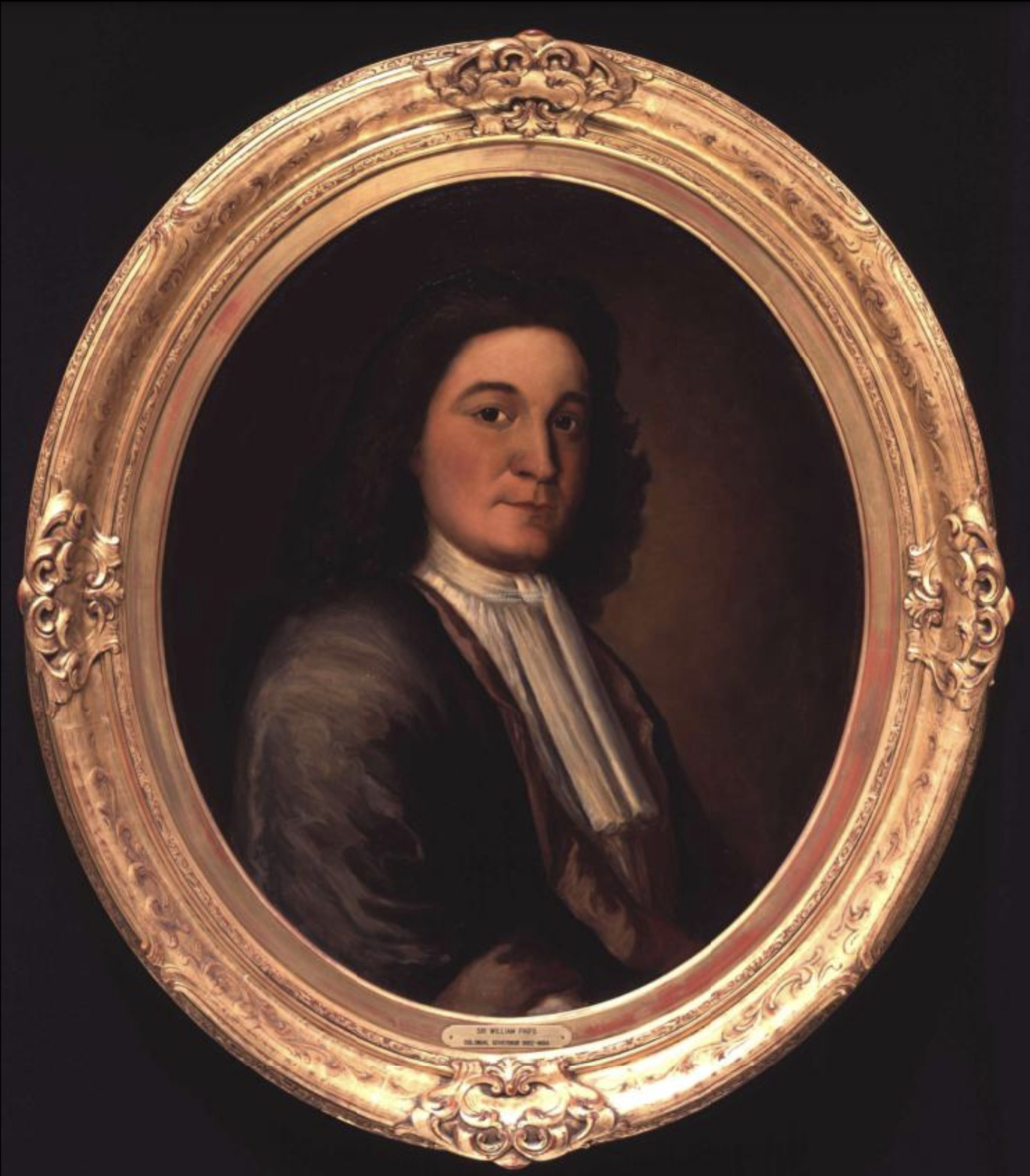
Sir William Phips. He died in 1694, leaving his adopted son a small fortune.

In 1713 he was appointed a justice of the peace for Middlesex County, and was also made colonel of a cavalry regiment in the colonial militia. He entered politics in 1721, winning election to the provincial assembly. He was, however, appointed to the governor's council that year, and thus did not take the assembly seat. He served in the council until 1724. From 1714 until 1755, Phips was recorded as owning five slaves: Tobe, Cuffy, Rose, Zillah and James.

== Lieutenant Governor of Massachusetts ==
Coat of Arms of William Phips

Following the death of Lieutenant Governor William Tailer in March 1731 – 1732, Phips was appointed to the post, in which he served under Governors Jonathan Belcher and William Shirley until his death. The reasons for his appointment are unknown: he did not appear to have the support of Belcher, who sought the appointment of others to the post.

Twice during his term he was acting governor for an extended period while Shirley was absent. The first time was in 1749 when Shirley took several years' leave to participate in boundary negotiations with France, returning in 1753. Later, in 1756, he took over again when Shirley returned to England to defend himself against charges of treason and incompetence.

During Shirley's extended absence beginning in 1749, Phips was seen as a somewhat weak executive. Shirley, not expecting his absence to be as long as it was, instructed Phips to avoid filling vacancies for offices that the governor made appointments for, and that any appointments he made should expire upon Shirley's return. The provincial assembly generally dominated affairs, led by fiscally conservative leaders such as House Speaker Thomas Hutchinson, who were opposed to the inflationary issuance of paper money. Phips implemented currency reforms advocated by Hutchinson to finally settle the province's longstanding problems with inflationary paper currencies. In 1751 he signed legislation authorizing the exchange of the province's unbacked paper currency for silver-based currency, and vetoed an attempt to issue paper currency.

=== Accommodation of Acadians ===
During parts of 1754 to 1756, Shirley was often out of the province on military business associated with the French and Indian War, and gubernatorial duties fell to Phips during those periods. The principal issue during this time was the arrival in November 1755 of several ships containing Acadians, who the British authorities had begun deporting from Nova Scotia after the Battle of Fort Beauséjour. The expenses incurred with housing and caring for about 1,000 Acadians burdened a provincial treasury already bearing the heavy demands of wartime. This prompted Phips to write to Nova Scotia Governor Charles Lawrence, demanding compensation for the care of the Acadians. In 1756, when Acadians who had been resettled in Georgia were found sailing north, apparently intent on returning to Nova Scotia, Phips again complained to Lawrence that Massachusetts was unable to handle any more Acadians.

=== Maine Indian policy ===
Phips was one of a group of landowners of a large tract of land on the central coast of modern Maine, then part of the Massachusetts Bay Colony. In 1719 the proprietors began to develop the area, establishing the communities of Thomaston and Warren. The indigenous Abenaki people objected to these settlements, claiming that their leaders who had made the original land grants had done so without proper authority. This dispute eventually escalated into a conflict known as Dummer's War, which lasted from 1723 until 1727.

In November 1749, Phips proclaimed the end of hostilities between Massachusetts and the Abenaki, who had sided with New France during the recently concluded King George's War (1744–1748), but were not signatories to the Treaty of Aix-la-Chapelle ending the European conflict. The following month one Abenaki was killed and two wounded by settlers in Wiscasset, Maine. The incident divided the leadership of the colony from its citizenry; Phips sought to maintain peace with the Abenaki, while the local citizenry believed the killings did not merit punishment. Mob action freed the suspects on more than one occasion, and only one of the men accused in the deeds was tried; he was acquitted. The perceived failure to serve justice heightened tensions with the Abenaki, some of whom embarked on a series of raiding expeditions against frontier communities. Massachusetts authorities were able to smooth over relations by satisfying Abenaki demands for justice by providing valuable gifts to the affected families. It was not until 1752 that the matter was finally closed at a peace conference.

A wider war, however, combined with frontier disagreements to again bring conflict to Maine. After hearing rumors of French fortifications on the northern Maine frontier, Shirley began rearming the province in March 1754. He ordered the construction of Fort Halifax on the Kennebec River, prompting the Abenakis to increase raiding activity. Because of these raids Massachusetts declared war on the Abenakis, "the Penobscot Tribe only Excepted". The Penobscots, however, were diplomatically trapped between the sides, seen as pro-British by the French, and distrusted by Maine colonists, and many Penobscots began siding with the French after an unprovoked attack by a group of New England militiamen on a native fishing party at Owls Head in July 1755.

In November 1755, while Shirley was absent from the province, Phips issued a proclamation declaring a war of extermination on the Penobscot, civilians included, offering scalp bounties.Phips Bounty Proclamation Scalps for males over the age of 12 were to be worth 50 pounds, females of the same age 25 pounds, male children under 12 netted 25 pounds, and female children under 12 fetched 20 pounds. Within a year of the proclamation, the Massachusetts assembly voted to raise the ceiling on the bounty to an unprecedented 300 pounds. Following a major raid against St. George in spring 1758, Governor Thomas Pownall in 1759 took possession of the Penobscot River and the tribe's homeland "by armed force".

== Second term and death ==
Phips' second term as acting governor, begun after Shirley's recall, was brief, and dominated by Thomas Hutchinson, then a leading member of Shirley's administration. Phips was elderly and ill, and died six months after Shirley left for England. The council then held the reins of power until the arrival of the new governor, Thomas Pownall.

The town of Spencer, Massachusetts, is named for Spencer Phips.

== Notes ==
Political offices
Preceded by William Tailer	Lieutenant Governor of the Province of Massachusetts Bay; 1732 – 1757	Succeeded by Thomas Hutchinson
Preceded by William Shirley	Governor of the Province of Massachusetts Bay (acting); September 15, 1749 – August 7, 1753	Succeeded by William Shirley
Preceded by William Shirley	Governor of the Province of Massachusetts Bay (acting); September 25, 1756 – April 4, 1757	Succeeded by Massachusetts Governor's Council (acting)
