= Primus Fowle =

American printer

- Born: c. 1701; Probably Western Africa
- Died: May 1791; Portsmouth, New Hampshire
- Occupation: Enslaved printer
- Years active: 1751–1791
- Known for: Printer of The New Hampshire Gazette

Primus Fowle (c. 1701 – May 1791) was an enslaved man owned by Daniel Fowle and employed in his printshop in Boston, Massachusetts, and later Portsmouth, New Hampshire.

Daniel Fowle married Lydia Hall in 1751. Lydia's father, Hugh Hall (1693–1773), was a man of property and had been a trader in the West Indies, a key market for African slaves. Primus may have been part of Lydia's dowry. Posthumous reminiscences identify his birthplace as Africa.

Primus worked in Daniel Fowle's printshop between 1751 and Fowle's retirement in 1785. He continued to work for Fowle's successors John Melchor and George Jerry Osborne, Jr, "until prevented by age." Isaiah Thomas recalled that Primus worked for "about fifty" years, a number that is repeated by subsequent sources but that is either a miscalculation or implies Primus may have had experience with printing ten years prior to working for Daniel Fowle.

There are no written records of which publications Primus printed, but some evidence suggests that he was the printer of The New Hampshire Gazette.

Primus was skilled enough in printing that he could work at a half-press without an assistant, "that is, he beat the form and did the pulling alone." Nineteenth-century accounts stress that Primus "could not read or write," and was "very illiterate". Yet when Daniel Fowle was charged by a Massachusetts court in 1755 for printing a seditious pamphlet, he indicated that Primus might have "assisted in the doing of" the pamphlet because "he sometimes worked for my brother." Some scholars have interpreted this to mean that Primus could set type, in addition to printing.

The New Hampshire Gazette published his obituary on May 19, 1791, and an anonymous poem, "Epitaph on the Death of Primus Fowle", the following week. The poem described him as someone known for drinking, and sometimes the subject of pranks; it concludes, "But now he's dead, we sure may say / Of him, as of all men, / That while in silent graves they lay / They'l not by plagu'd again." The modern journalist J. Dennis Robinson described the poem as "warm, yet patronizing, and tinged with just a hint of guilt." In 2004, Primus was memorialized with a plaque on the Portsmouth Black Heritage Trail near the site of the print shop.

== Bibliography ==
- Adams, Nathaniel (1825). The Annals of Portsmouth. Portsmouth: By the author.
- Fowle, Daniel (1755). A Total Eclipse of Liberty: Being a true and faithful account of the arraignment, and examination of Daniel Fowle before the Honourable House of Representatives. Boston: [Daniel Fowle].
- Green, Lorenzo (1942). The Negro in Colonial New England, 1620–1776. Columbia University Press.
- Hardesty, Jared Ross (2016). Unfreedom: Slavery and Dependence in Eighteenth-Century Boston. NYU Press. ISBN 978-1-4798-1614-9.
- Moore, John W. (1886). Moore's Historical, Biographical, and Miscellaneous Gatherings, in the Form of Disconnected Notes Relative to Printers, Printing, Publishing, and Editing of Books, News-papers, Magazines and Other Literary Productions. Concord, NH: The Republican Press Association.
- Senchyne, Jonathan (2019). "Under Pressure: Reading Material Textuality in the Recovery of Early African American Print". Arizona Quarterly. 75 (3): 109–132. doi:10.1353/arq.2019.0013.
- Thomas, Isaiah (1810). A History of Printing in America. Worcester, MA: Isaiah Thomas. (2 vols.)
