= American Magazine and Historical Chronicle =

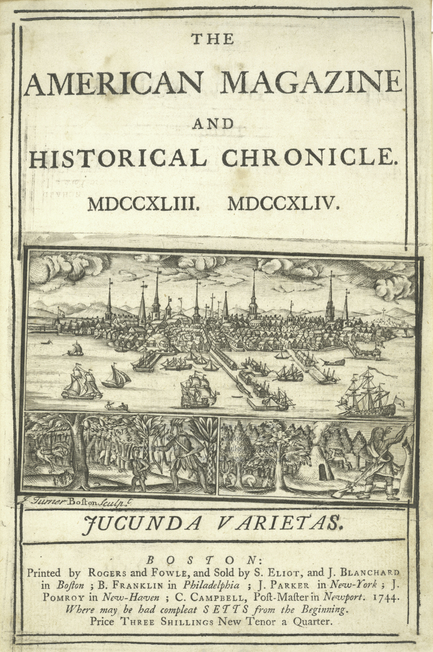
American Magazine, 1744. "Printed by Rogers and Fowle, and sold by S. Eliot, and J. Blanchard in Boston; B. Franklin in Philadelphia; J. Parker in New York; J. Pomroy in New Haven; C. Campbell, post-master in Newport"

The American Magazine and Historical Chronicle (1743-1746) was a periodical in Boston, Massachusetts, printed by Rogers & Fowle (Gamaliel Rogers and Daniel Fowle), and published by Samuel Eliot and Joshua Blanchard. Scholars suggest that Jeremiah Gridley served as editor.
