= The New Hampshire Gazette =

Biweekly American newspaper

- The subscription edition of The New Hampshire Gazette from January 26, 2007
- Type: Biweekly newspaper
- Format: Small format broadsheet
- Publisher: Steven Fowle, Editor in chief
- Founded: 1756/1989
- Political alignment: Progressive
- Headquarters: Portsmouth, New Hampshire, U.S.
- Price: Free
- Website: nhgazette.com

The New Hampshire Gazette is a nonprofit, alternative, bi-weekly newspaper published in Portsmouth, New Hampshire. Its editors claim that the paper, which all but disappeared into other publications until the late 1900s, is the oldest newspaper in the United States. The paper trademarked the phrase "The Nation's Oldest Newspaper" after being revived as a small biweekly in 1989. This assertion is highly contested, and the Hartford Courant is generally understood to be the nation's oldest newspaper when considering scholarly articles, standard journalism, and historical texts.

== History ==
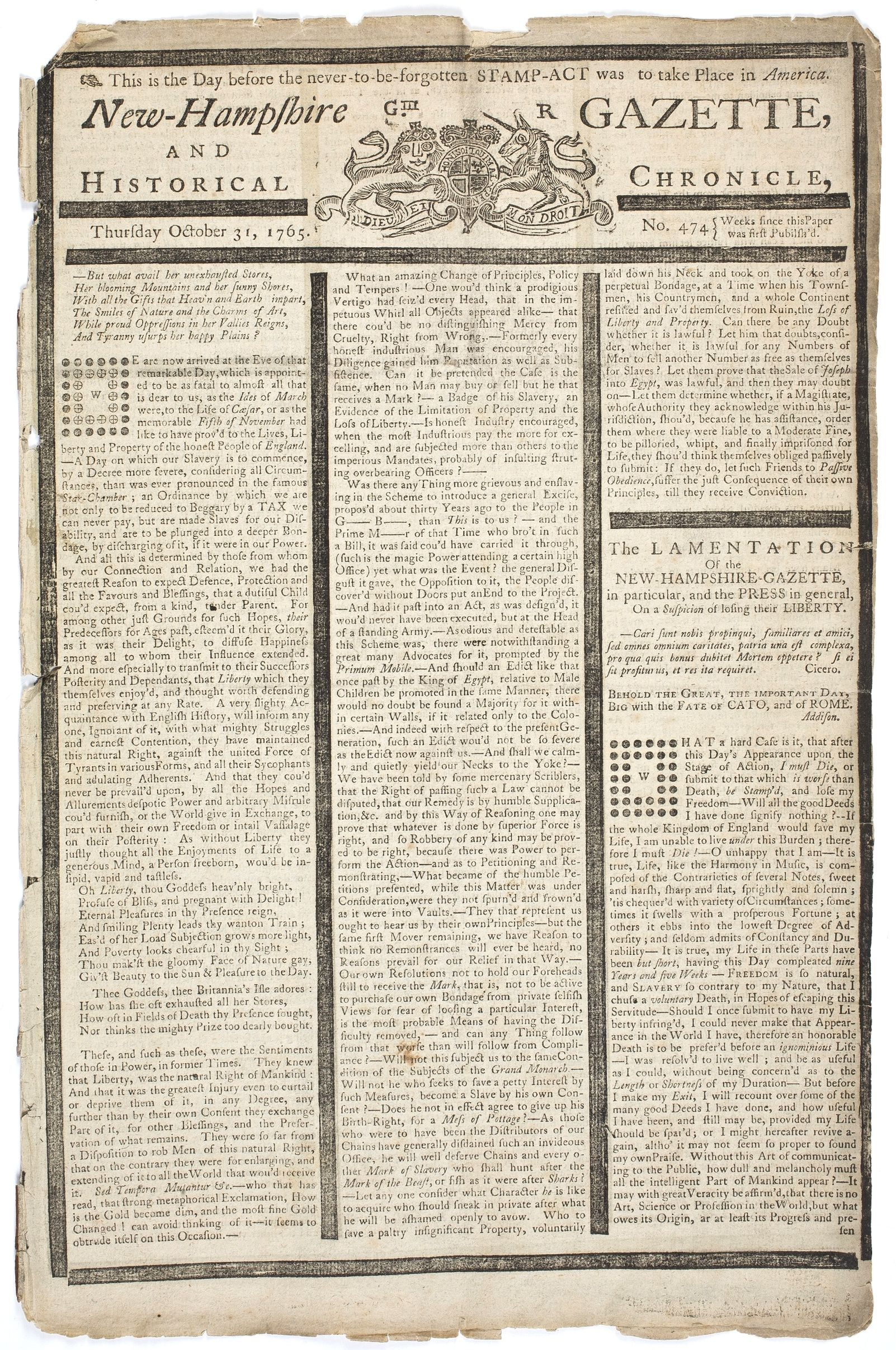
The New Hampshire Gazette, front page, October 31, 1765 issue, with black borders, and an announcement protesting the coming of the Stamp Act Page 2 3 4

=== 18th century ===
The New Hampshire Gazette was founded in Portsmouth on October 7, 1756, by printer Daniel Fowle as the first newspaper in the Province of New Hampshire. Fowle lived in Boston before founding the Gazette, and was the first to print the words of Samuel Adams. He also spent time in prison for printing anti-British pamphlets "The Monster of Monsters" and "A Total Eclipse of Liberty." Recent research suggests that while Fowle was the publisher of The New Hampshire Gazette until 1785, much of the printing was done by an enslaved man, Primus Fowle.

Before the Stamp Act of 1765 was to take effect on November 1 of that year The New Hampshire Gazette featured an edition with black borders about its edges and columns, protesting the tax it was about to place on paper and advertising. Other newspapers, like the Pennsylvania Journal, also featured editions with black borders in response to the coming Stamp Act. The November 1 edition of the Gazette also included a lengthy article strongly deriding the act.

During the American Revolution it published a eulogy, dated Epsom, July 1775, to Andrew McClary, who died during the Battle of Bunker Hill. It read: "The Major discovered great intrepidity and presence of mind in the action, and his noble soul glowed with ardor and the love of his country . . ."

=== 19th century ===
The Gazette continued publishing after Fowle's death in 1787, and in 1839, was recognized as the oldest newspaper in the United States after the Maryland Gazette ceased publication. Starting in the 1890s, the Gazette was published by The Portsmouth Herald on weekends as a supplement to the Herald.

=== 20th century ===
In 1960, the Gazette was renamed the Herald Weekend Edition, although the masthead indicated that the paper was "Continuing the New Hampshire Gazette".

In 1989, a descendant of Daniel Fowle's, Steven Fowle, discovered that the Herald relinquished the trade name for the Gazette. Fowle registered the rights to the name and that spring began publishing the Gazette as an independent entity "episodically, in a very small format" until May 1, 1999, when the publishers began its current format and schedule.

== Claims of seniority ==
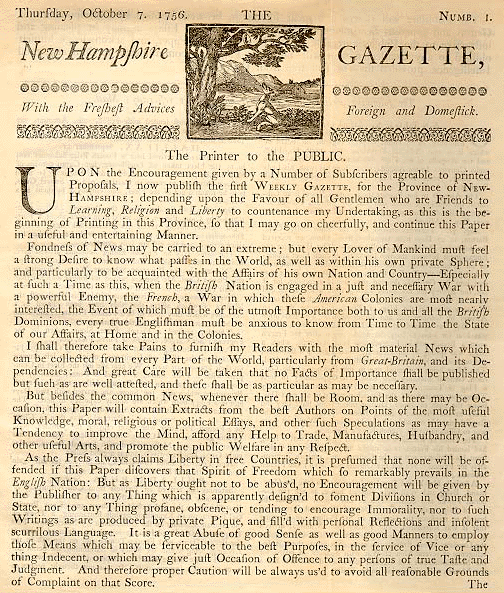
The front page of the first issue of the Gazette, October 7, 1756

The Hartford Courant, founded as a weekly in 1764, calls itself the nation's oldest continuously published newspaper, and is cited as such in scholarly articles, standard journalism, and historical texts. It was an independent company until it was absorbed by Times Mirror, the parent company of the Los Angeles Times, in 1979. Tribune Corporation acquired Times Mirror, and by extension the Hartford Courant, in 2000. In contrast, the New Hampshire Gazette has changed owners "over two-dozen times", by its owner's count, and has often merged with other publications.

The Newport Mercury in Rhode Island was identified as the nation's oldest newspaper during one of the New Hampshire Gazette's lulls. It was founded in 1758. The Newport Mercury ceased publication during the American Revolutionary War which The Hartford Courant cites as definitive proof that only itself, and not Mercury, can qualify as the longest "continuously published" newspaper in the United States. The Mercury eventually was published by The Newport Daily News as a weekly by-mail edition, reprinting stories from the daily for out-of-town subscribers. Most recently, it became a tabloid magazine and web site using the address newportmercury.com but also using the name Mercury Magazine.

== Content and format ==
The Gazette, as an alternative paper, is more focused on commentary than the reporting of current events. Its editorial content can easily be described as "liberal". In recent years the paper has cemented its self-imposed mission as an independent voice railing against corporate media and conservative political control.

Published every two weeks as a smaller format broadsheet, usually of 14–20 pages, the Gazette's front page is usually an editorial called "The Fortnightly Rant", covering a few subjects of national or regional importance, accompanied by a political cartoon by Mike Dater reflecting the editorial. The motto of the newspaper is the motto of the state of New Hampshire, Live Free or Die.

Among articles of varying size and content are regular columns such as "Moving Pictures" (film commentary) by Rodman Philbrick and most notedly a regular essay, "History Matters," covering two pages or more by Portsmouth historian J. Dennis Robinson. Other regular features include "Hate Mail, Mash Notes, & Other Correspondence" (the letters page), the "Northcountry Chronicle", an editorial by William Marvel, "Free the Media Press" (stories culled from the New Hampshire Indymedia Collective), and a reprinting of "Vintage News" from past issues of the Gazette usually dating to the mid-19th century. ("Better old news, than new lies.") The most popular section of the newspaper is "Admiral Fowle's Piscataqua River Tidal Guide" on the last page which, in addition to a chronology of the tides to take place over each day of the upcoming two weeks, contains an idiosyncratic, and often hilarious listing of significant events from that day in history.

== Circulation ==
The paper's circulation is about 5,500, with nearly 1,000 mail subscribers throughout the country.

== Website ==
For many years, the website for the Gazette had many resources in relation to its history, including a 19th-century reproduction of its first issue, a timeline and explanation of its position as oldest newspaper, and much more. Beginning the summer of 2007, the website changed focus and format to that of a blog-type website. Content from each issue of the paper is minimal in comparison with how most newspapers publish articles online as well as in print, though the Gazette occasionally does offer a PDF of an issue, usually a couple of weeks after its publication.

== See also ==
- Early American publishers and printers
- Nonprofit journalism

== Sources ==
- Frothingham, Richard; Swett, Samuel (1850). The Command in the Battle of Bunker Hill. Charles C. Little & James brown, Boston.
- Lee, James Melvin (1923). History of American journalism. Boston, New York, Houghton Mifflin Company.
- Thomas, Isaiah (1874). The history of printing in America, with a biography of printers. Vol. I. New York, B. Franklin.
