= The Independent Advertiser =

Newspaper founded in 1748 by Samuel Adams

The Independent Advertiser was an American patriot publication, founded in January 1748 in Boston by the then 26-year-old Samuel Adams, advocating republicanism, liberty and independence from Great Britain. Published by Gamaliel Rogers and Daniel Fowle, the Advertiser consisted primarily of essays written by a group of "gentlemen" on topics of contemporary New England politics. The Independent Advertiser ceased publication in December 1749: "Nobody knew just why. What Boston did know was that Captain Samuel Adams had died in 1748 and the sheriff brought suit against the family for old debts left over from the Land Bank failure of 1741. Young Sam Adams was no longer in a position to put money in a newspaper or in anything else."
