= Daniel Fowle (printer) =

American printer

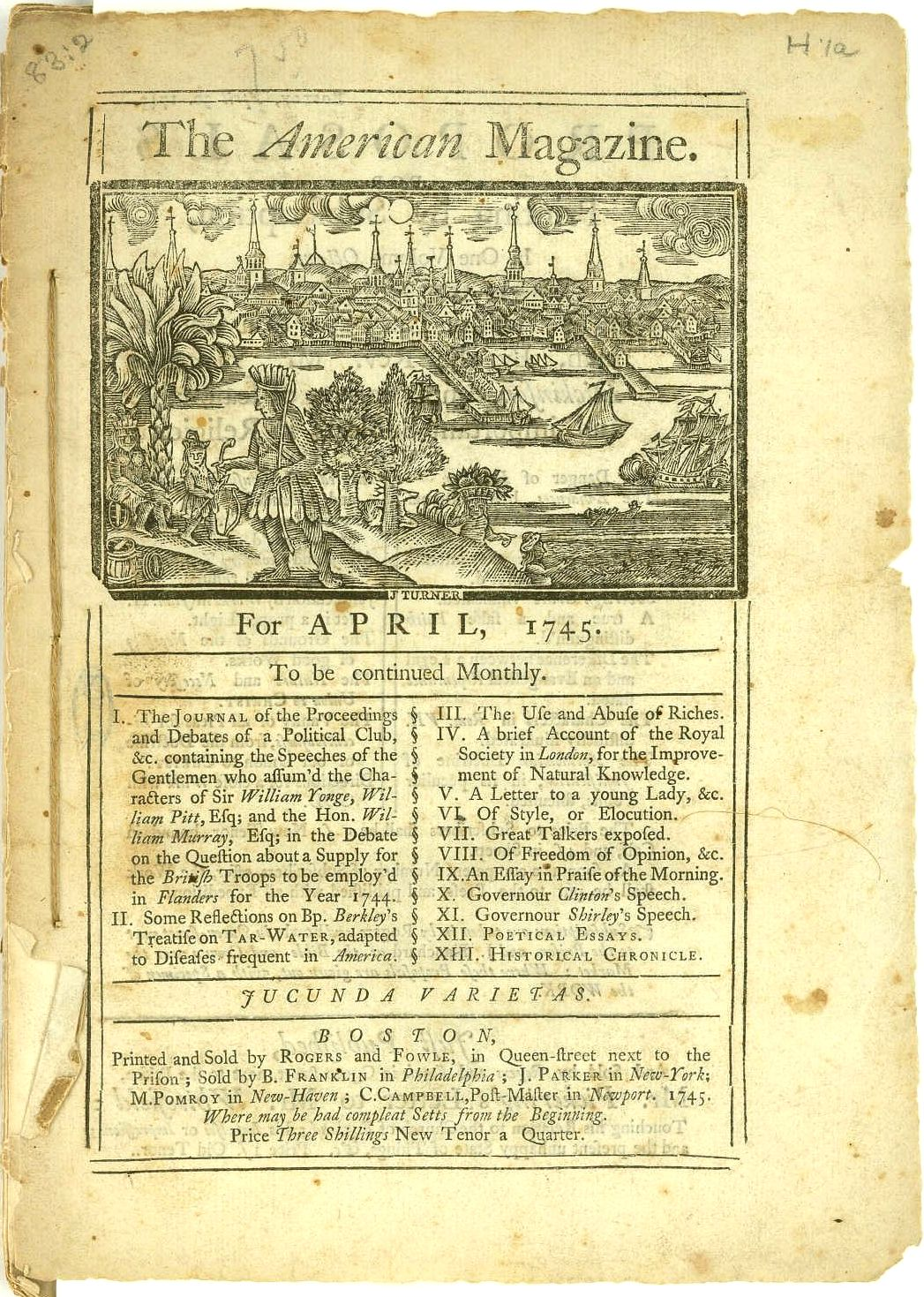
- The American Magazine, published by Rogers & Fowle, Boston, 1745; Original in the John Carter Brown Library at Brown University
- Born: c. 1715; Boston, Massachusetts
- Died: June 1787
- Occupation: Printer
- Known for: Founder of The New Hampshire Gazette

Daniel Fowle (c. 1715 – June 1787) was a colonial American printer and publisher before and during the American Revolution, and the founder of The New Hampshire Gazette. He printed Samuel Adams' newspaper, The Independent Advertiser. He was jailed for printing a damaging account on the conduct of various Massachusetts representatives and after his trial, he lost his license to print. Dismayed with the Massachusetts government he subsequently chose to remove from Massachusetts to New Hampshire and established The New Hampshire Gazette. During the course of his printing career Fowle employed several apprentices. Using his newspaper, he openly criticized the Stamp Act in 1765. After American independence was established he was commissioned to print the state laws of New Hampshire.

== Early years ==
Daniel Fowle was born in Charlestown, and served his apprenticeship with Samuel Kneeland, a prominent printer in Boston. He moved to Boston, Massachusetts, and became an active printer in that city beginning in 1740. He married into a very respectable family in Boston, but his marriage produced no children. Renown printer and historian Isiah Thomas said of Fowle, that he was exacting and articulate in his printing and industrious in his method. He bore a mild disposition and was agreeable in his manners, liberal in his sentiments, and was devoted to the cause of his country.

== Life in Massachusetts ==
Over the next fifteen years, Fowle printed and co-printed publications such as the American Magazine and Historical Chronicle and The Independent Advertiser. The first issue of The Independent Advertiser was printed on January 4, by Rogers and Fowle. Among its writers were Jonathan Mayhew, a controversial Congregationalist and the eventual founder of Unitarianism in America, and an outspoken critic of the Stamp Act. Fowle became the junior business partner with Gamaliel Rogers in 1742. They manufactured their own ink used in the printing of their works, and are supposed to be the first printers in America who were successful in that effort. Fowle and Rogers were the first to print the New Testament in the American Colonies, for Daniel Henchman, and the first printer to publish the revolutionary writings of Samuel Adams.

In 1755 Fowle was approached and asked by a few gentlemen, who were opposed to the measures of the general court, and in particular, an excise act on rum. They employed him to assist his brother, Zechariah Fowle to print a pamphlet entitled, The Monster of Monsters, deriding and criticizing this act, while also severely admonishing several members of the court. Joseph Russell, his apprentice, then nearly of age, worked at the case, and a negro man (probably Primus Fowle) at the press. After publication of the affair Fowle was promptly arrested while at his dinner table on orders from the Massachusetts House of Representatives for printing a seditious pamphlet called "The Monster of Monsters." He was brought before the House and was questioned by the Speaker. Fowle did not cooperate with the Speaker and repeatedly responded to questions in an evasive manner. After the hearing he was jailed at a place that held thieves and murderers and was denied visitation from his wife. Fowle subsequently lost his license to print. After his release from jail, he printed "A Total Eclipse of Liberty" in response to his arrest and fled to Portsmouth, New Hampshire.

== Life in New Hampshire ==
After leaving Massachusetts Fowle arrived in and established his residence in Portsmouth. He opened his printing shop on Anne Street, where, in addition to performing various small printing jobs on his press, he sold books and pamphlets. Shortly after arriving at Portsmouth, Fowle received the commission of the town's magistrate. He was also commissioned to print the various laws of the province along with various pamphlets. On October 7, 1756, Fowle began publication of The New Hampshire Gazette, at which time he took on an apprentice named Thomas Furber, a native of Portsmouth. The Gazette became that colony's sole newspaper at the beginning of the Revolution.

Fowle took on his nephew Robert as a partner and employed him as the editor, while they also taught a slave on how to operate and maintain the printing press. Fowle also took on his second apprentice, another nephew named Samuel Hall, from Medford, Massachusetts. Among the printing material Fowle brought with him to Portsmouth was a set of wood and metal cuts of emblems, which included one of the Crow and the Fox, which was used to adorn the heading of his newspaper. Following this, the newspaper heading used a cut of Jupiter and the Peacock. Then the Royal Arms was used, however, as the revolution drew near and the spirit of independence became commonplace throughout the colonies, all signs of royalty steadily disappeared from newspapers and other such printings.

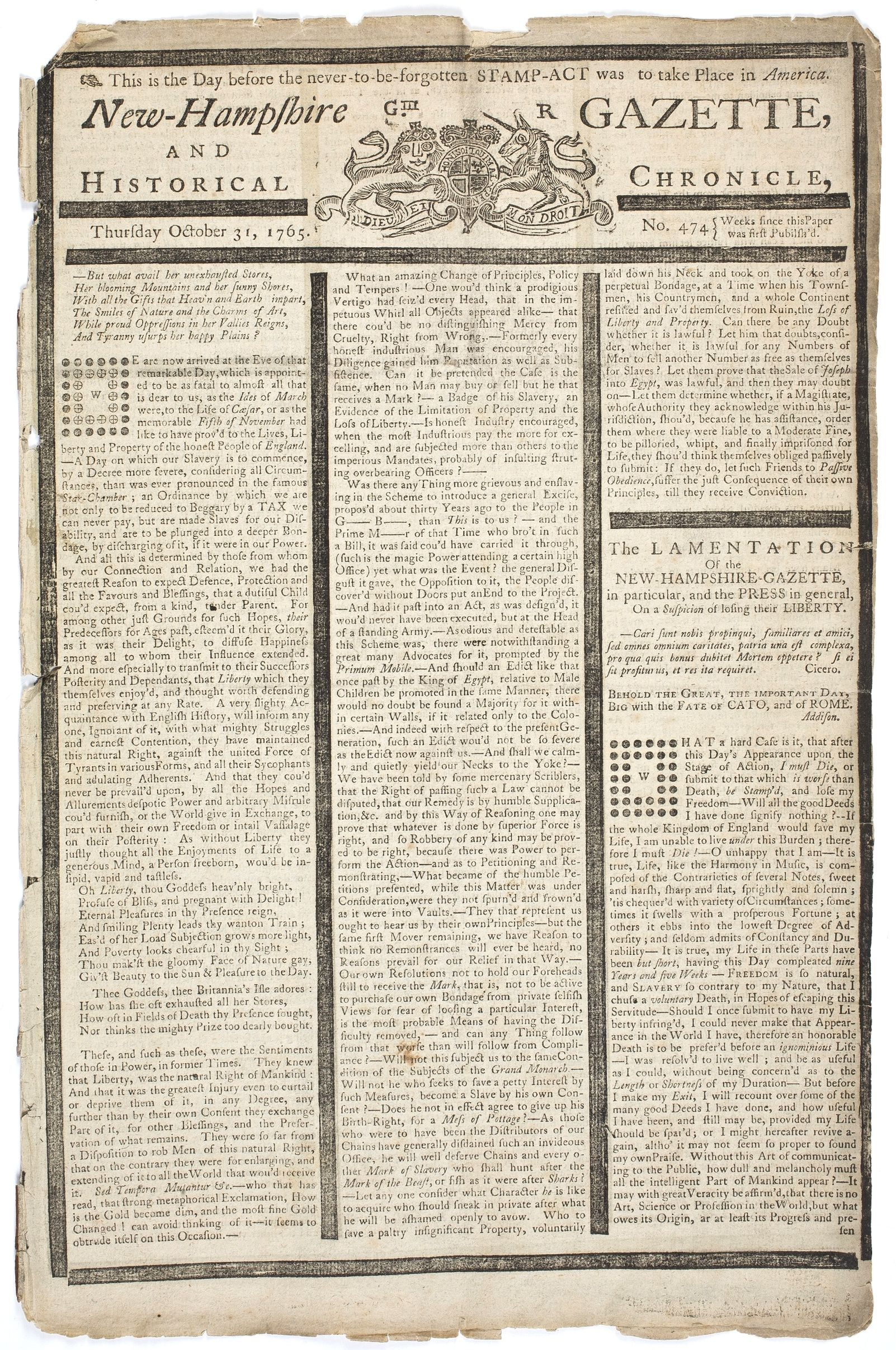
The New Hampshire Gazette, front page, October 31, 1765 issue, with black borders, and an announcement protesting the coming of the Stamp Act (Page 2 3 4)

On November 1, 1765, the Stamp Act was slated to take effect. On the day before, in protest to the advent, the New Hampshire Gazette was printed with black borders, as did numerous other newspapers at that time. The Gazette announced that it would cease further publication because, like so many other printers, Fowle was unwilling to pay the burdensome stamp tax, which was forcing an increase in newspaper prices. The opening passage of the Gazette article read:

We are now arrived at the Eve of that remarkable Day, which is appointed to be as fatal to almost all that is dear to us, as the Ides of March were to the life of Cesar.

The Gazette article went on to reference the effect of the Stamp Act as an act of slavery and a threat to commerce, and that its enforcement would amount to nothing less than a loss of liberty.

In the years leading up to, and during the course of the Revolutionary War, the people of Portsmouth largely had strong loyalist sympathies. Subsequently the Gazette was published irregularly and only mildly supported the American cause for independence. In 1776 Fowle printed an issue urging the Provincial Congress not to establish an independent government out of concern that this would likely be taken by the royal colonial government as a desire to throw off British rule. Fowle was promptly summoned before the Congress, severely censured, for the "ignominious, scurrilous, and scandalous piece". After being warned to never publish articles reflecting upon the Congress or the cause for independence in such a manner he ceased printing the paper until his nephew Robert L. Fowle in effect revived it on May 22 at Exeter. By this time some devoted and politically active whigs thought the Fowles were too timid in promoting the cause of liberty and independence, and that their printing press activity was too much under the influence of the colonial royal officials. They encouraged Furber to set up his own press in the province. He subsequently parted company with Fowle toward the end of 1764, and opened a printing house in Portsmouth, becoming a competitor of Fowle. Soon after he also published a newspaper in competition with Fowle's Gazette.

As Daniel was a Whig and his nephew Robert a loyalist, their partnership was eventually dissolved, and Robert established himself as a printer in nearby Exeter. In addition to the Gazette, Fowle published state laws, as well as the first book published in the colony, Reverend Samuel Langdon's The Excellency of the Word of God. He published the Gazette until 1785. Before Fowle's death that year he sold the New Hampshire Gazette to two of his current apprentices, John Melcher and George Jerry Osborne. As of 2021, the Gazette, America's oldest newspaper, is still published. After Fowle died the Gazette was turned over to two of his apprentices, John Melcher and George Jerry in 1785. Fowle lived long enough to see the principles of Samuel Adams and the Caucus Club, which were enumerated in The Independent Advertiser in 1752, put forward and incorporated into the young independent nation.

== See also ==
- Early American publishers and printers
- History of printing
- History of American newspapers
- History of newspaper publishing
- List of early American publishers and printers

== Bibliography ==
- Buckingham, Joseph Tinker (1850). Specimens of newspaper literature : with personal memoirs, anecdotes, and reminiscences. Vol. I. Boston : Charles C. Little and James Brown.
- Lee, James Melvin (1923). History of American journalism. Boston, New York, Houghton Mifflin Company.
- Hudson, Frederic (1873). Journalism in the United States, from 1690 to 1872. New York, Harper & Brothers.
- Schlesinger, Arthur M. (1958). Prelude To Independence The Newspaper War On Britain 1764 1776. Alfred A. Knopf.
- Thomas, Isaiah (1874). The history of printing in America, with a biography of printers. Vol. I. New York, B. Franklin.
- Wilson, James Grant; Fiske, John (1887–1900). Appletons' cyclopædia of American biography. Vol. II. New York, D. Appleton and company.
- Wilson, James Grant; Fiske, John (1887–1900). Appletons' cyclopædia of American biography. Vol. IV. New York, D. Appleton and company.
- "History". New Hampshire Gazette. Archived from the original on October 1, 2005.
- University of New Hampshire Library (2008). "The Popular Press in New Hampshire, 1756–1800: Daniel Fowle (1715–1787)". University of New Hampshire Library—Milne Special Collections. Archived from the original on June 9, 2008.
